= Nova Vas, Sežana =

Nova Vas
- Location in Slovenia
- Coordinates: 45°47′28.83″N 13°53′50.22″E
- Country: Slovenia
- Traditional region: Littoral
- Statistical region: Coastal–Karst
- Municipality: Sežana

Area
  - Total: 0.43 km^{2} (0.17 sq mi)
- Elevation: 373.7 m (1,226 ft)

Population (2002)
  - Total: 6

Nova Vas (pronounced [ˈnɔːʋa ˈʋaːs]; Slovene: Nova vas) is a small village north of Kazlje in the Municipality of Sežana in the Littoral region of Slovenia.
