= Kosovelje =

- Location in Slovenia
- Coordinates: 45°47′12.84″N 13°47′45.22″E
- Country: Slovenia
- Traditional region: Littoral
- Statistical region: Coastal–Karst
- Municipality: Sežana

Area
  - Total: 2.07 km^{2} (0.80 sq mi)
- Elevation: 247.9 m (813 ft)

Kosovelje (pronounced [kɔsɔˈʋeːljɛ]) is a small village north of Pliskovica in the Municipality of Sežana in the Littoral region of Slovenia.
