= Žirje =

Žirje can refer to:

- Žirje, Croatia, an island and settlement in the Adriatic Sea in Croatia
- Žirje, Slovenia, a village in the Municipality of Sežana in Slovenia
