= Merče =

- Location in Slovenia
- Coordinates: 45°42′6.31″N 13°54′3.03″E
- Country: Slovenia
- Traditional region: Littoral
- Statistical region: Coastal–Karst
- Municipality: Sežana

Area
  - Total: 3.92 km^{2} (1.51 sq mi)
- Elevation: 389.7 m (1,279 ft)

Population (2002)
  - Total: 119

Merče (pronounced [ˈmeːɾtʃɛ] or [ˈmɛːɾtʃɛ]; Italian: Merciano) is a village in the Municipality of Sežana in the Littoral region of Slovenia.

The local church is dedicated to Saint Andrew and belongs to the Parish of Povir.
