= Podbreže =

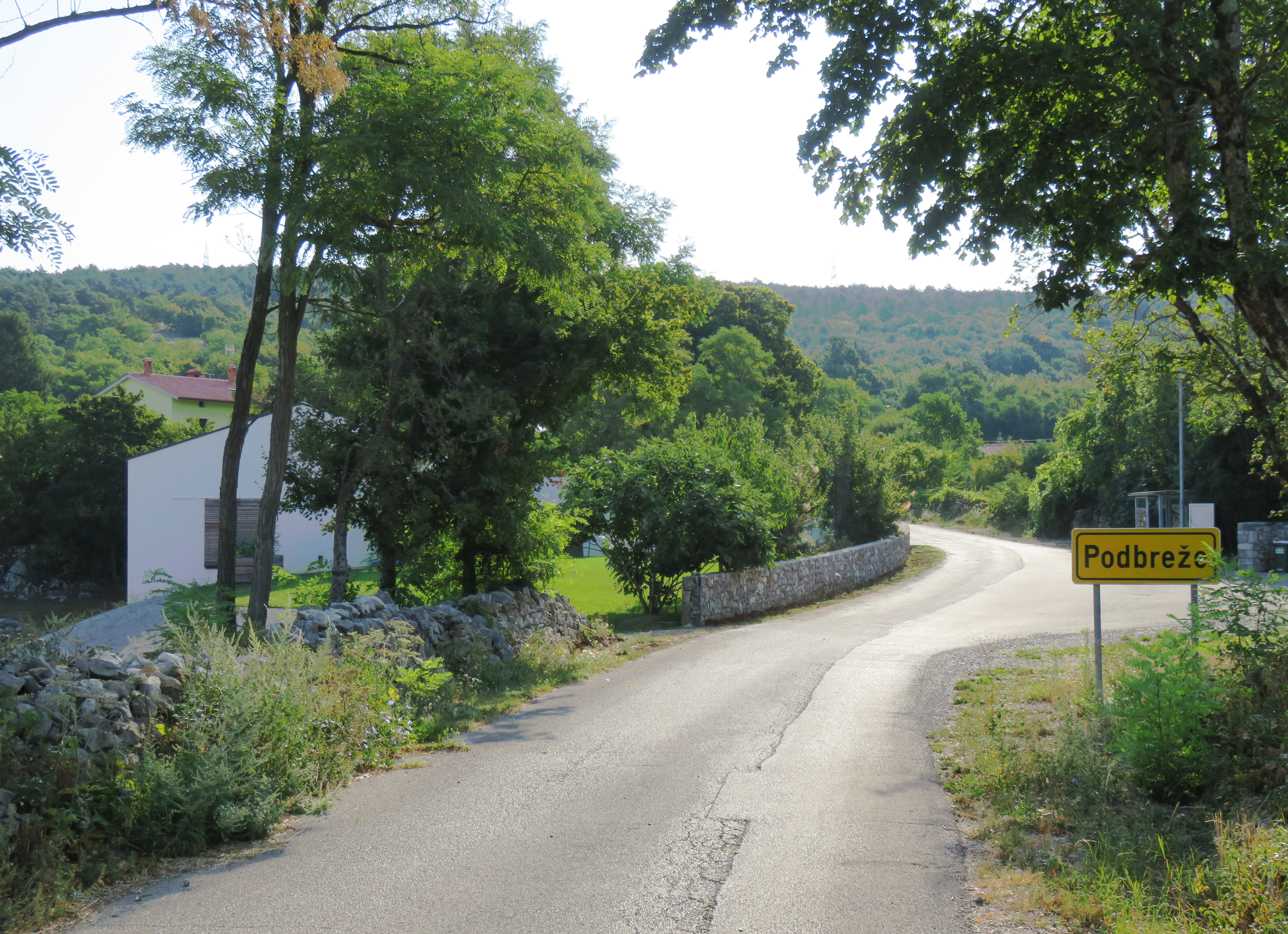

- Location in Slovenia
- Coordinates: 45°43′30.92″N 13°55′52.37″E
- Country: Slovenia
- Traditional region: Littoral
- Statistical region: Coastal–Karst
- Municipality: Sežana

Area
  - Total: 3.33 km^{2} (1.29 sq mi)
- Elevation: 382.6 m (1,255 ft)

Population (2002)
  - Total: 40

Podbreže (pronounced [pɔdˈbɾeːʒɛ]; Italian: Villa Podibrese) is a small village south of Štorje in the Municipality of Sežana in the Littoral region of Slovenia.
