= Raša, Sežana =

Raša
- Location in Slovenia
- Coordinates: 45°47′26″N 13°53′25″E
- Country: Slovenia
- Traditional region: Littoral
- Statistical region: Coastal–Karst
- Municipality: Sežana

Area
  - Total: 0.93 km^{2} (0.36 sq mi)
- Elevation: 272 m (892 ft)

Population (2002)
  - Total: 0

Raša (pronounced [ˈɾaːʃa]) is a small settlement in the Municipality of Sežana in the Littoral region of Slovenia. It no longer has any permanent residents.
