= Dolenje, Sežana =

Dolenje
- Location in Slovenia
- Coordinates: 45°47′22.15″N 13°54′3.32″E
- Country: Slovenia
- Traditional region: Littoral
- Statistical region: Coastal–Karst
- Municipality: Sežana

Area
  - Total: 0.86 km^{2} (0.33 sq mi)
- Elevation: 366 m (1,201 ft)

Population (2002)
  - Total: 28

Dolenje (pronounced [dɔˈleːnjɛ]) is a small settlement in the Municipality of Sežana in the Littoral region of Slovenia.
