= Grahovo Brdo =

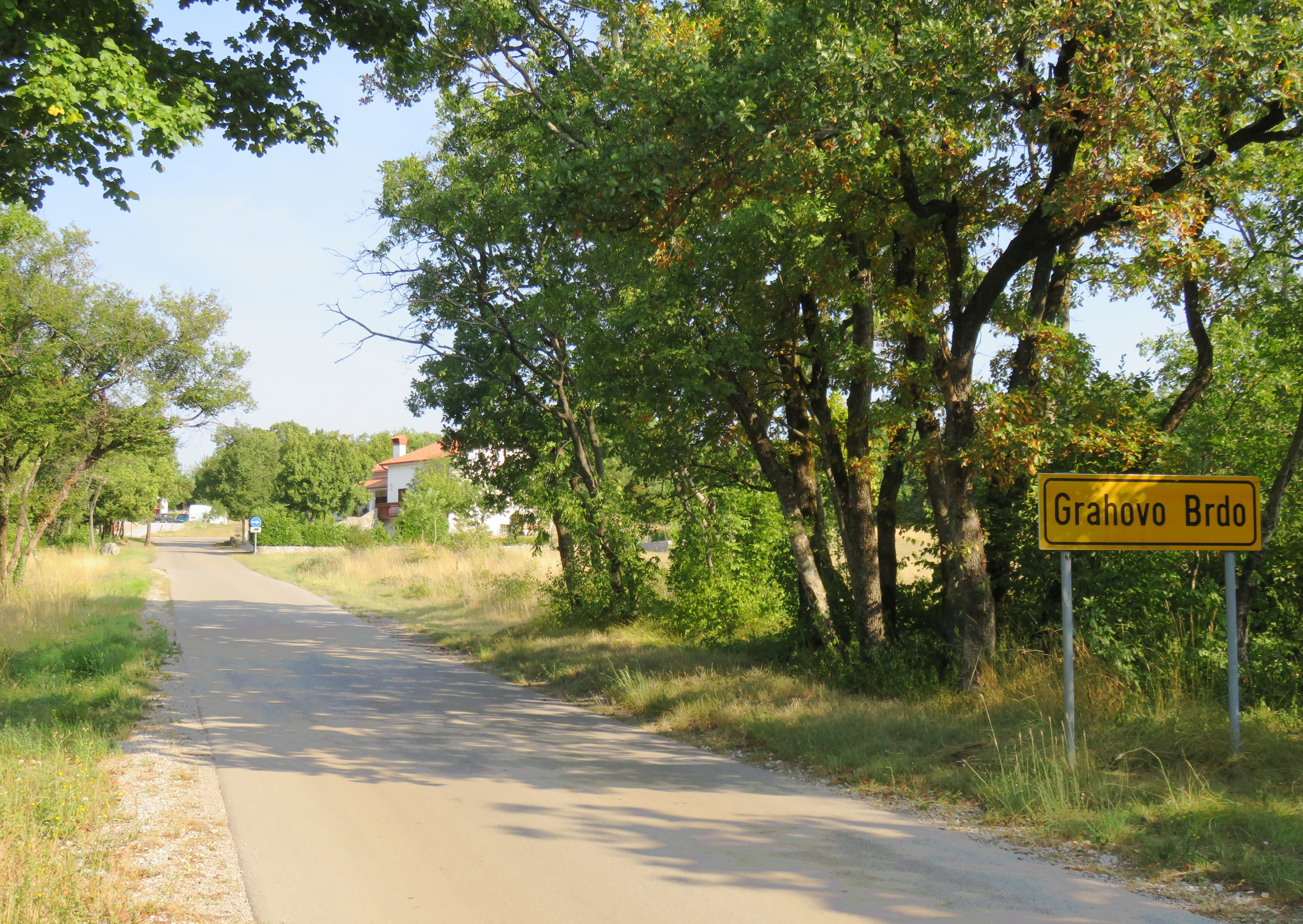

- Location in Slovenia
- Coordinates: 45°45′46.54″N 13°53′46.98″E
- Country: Slovenia
- Traditional region: Littoral
- Statistical region: Coastal–Karst
- Municipality: Sežana

Area
  - Total: 2.76 km^{2} (1.07 sq mi)
- Elevation: 352.5 m (1,156 ft)

Population (2002)
  - Total: 28

Grahovo Brdo (pronounced [ˈɡɾaːxɔʋɔ ˈbəɾdɔ]; Italian: Gracovo di Tomadio) is a small settlement east of Križ in the Municipality of Sežana in the Littoral region of Slovenia.
