= Voglje, Sežana =

Voglje
- Village
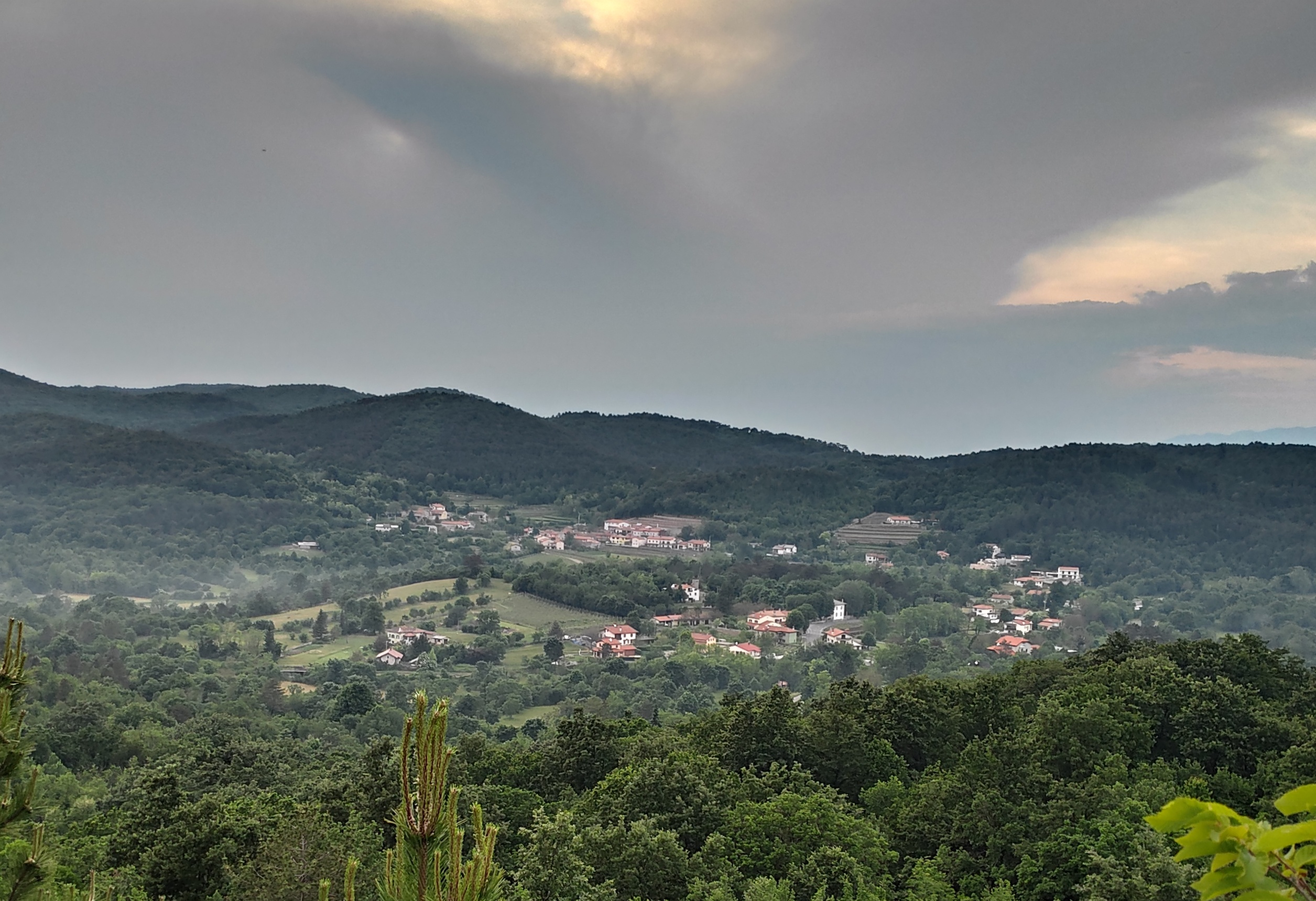
- Voglje and the nearby village of Dol pri Vogljah

- Location in Slovenia
- Coordinates: 45°43′45.97″N 13°48′28.51″E
- Country: Slovenia
- Traditional region: Littoral
- Statistical region: Coastal–Karst
- Municipality: Sežana

Area
  - Total: 1.08 km^{2} (0.42 sq mi)
- Elevation: 329.5 m (1,081 ft)

Population (2002)
  - Total: 72
  - Density: 67/km^{2} (170/sq mi)

Voglje (pronounced [ˈʋoːɡljɛ]; Italian: Vogliano) is a village in the Municipality of Sežana in the Littoral region of Slovenia right on the border with Italy.
