= Avber =

- Location in Slovenia
- Coordinates: 45°46′50.43″N 13°52′26.26″E
- Country: Slovenia
- Traditional region: Littoral
- Statistical region: Coastal–Karst
- Municipality: Sežana

Area
  - Total: 2.36 km^{2} (0.91 sq mi)
- Elevation: 395.4 m (1,297 ft)

Population (2002)
  - Total: 89

Avber (pronounced [ˈaːu̯bəɾ]; Italian: Alber) is a village in the Municipality of Sežana in the Littoral region of Slovenia. The village includes the hamlets of Peganski Konec, Dolenski Konec (or Orlovski Konec), and Britof.

== History ==
Avber was first mentioned in documents dating to 1502. There are remains of an ancient fort on a hill rising above the village.

== Church ==
The parish church in the settlement is dedicated to Saint Nicholas and belongs to the Koper Diocese. It houses frescos by Tone Kralj from 1928 depicting Saint Nicholas, the Annunciation, Saint Luke painting the Virgin, John the Baptist, the Holy Family, the Risen Christ and others. The works in Avber represent the peak of Kralj's religious painting.

== Notable people ==
Notable people that were born or lived in Avber include:

- Ivan Bole (1878–?), composer
- Albert Poljšak, museum collector
- Virgil Šček (1889–1948), Roman Catholic priest, ethnologist, and politician
