= Godnje =

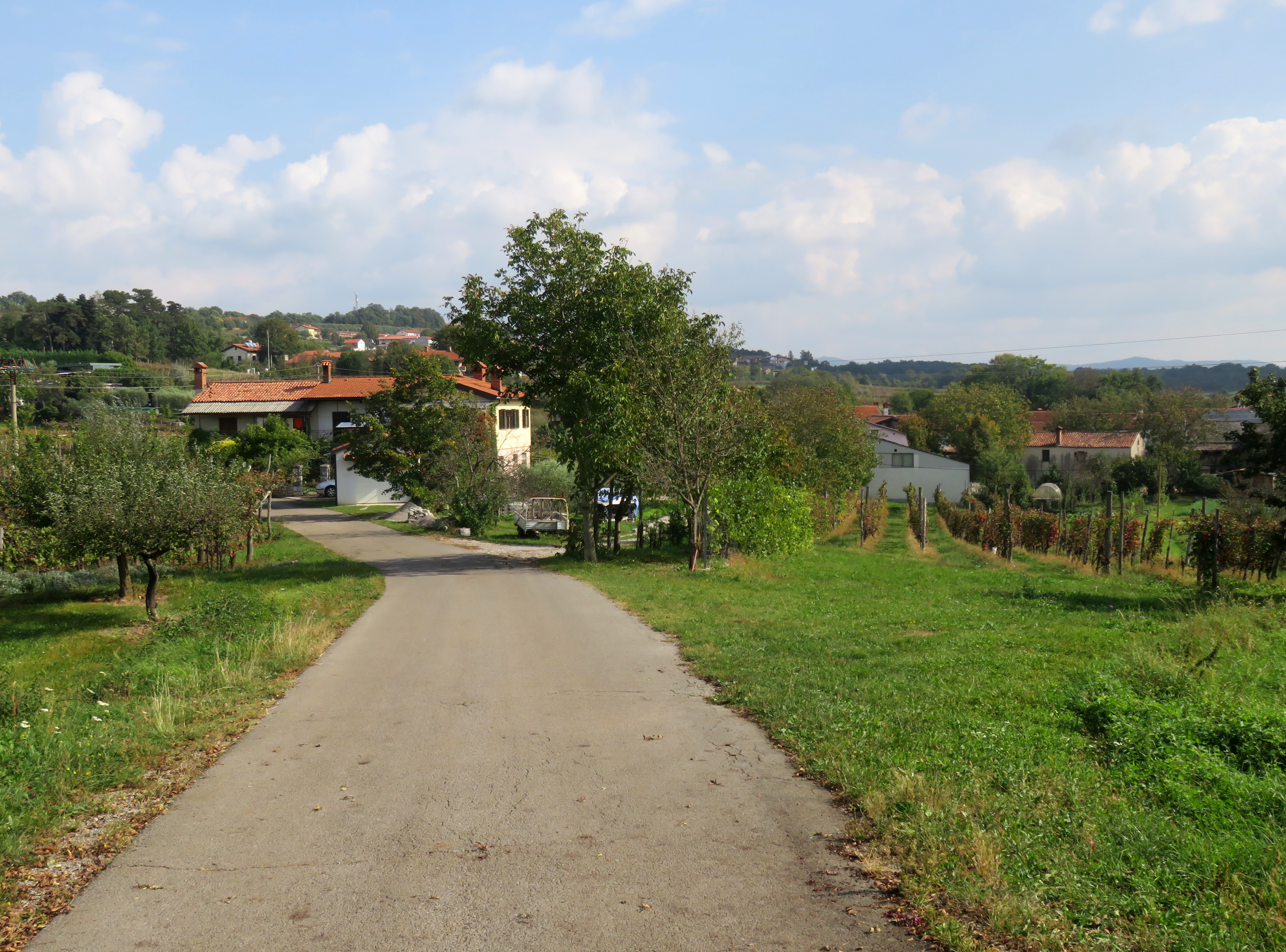

- Location in Slovenia
- Coordinates: 45°45′7.82″N 13°50′24.81″E
- Country: Slovenia
- Traditional region: Littoral
- Statistical region: Coastal–Karst
- Municipality: Sežana

Area
  - Total: 0.46 km^{2} (0.18 sq mi)
- Elevation: 303.8 m (997 ft)

Population (2002)
  - Total: 86

Godnje (pronounced [ˈɡoːdnjɛ]; Italian: Godignano) is a small settlement next to Dutovlje in the Municipality of Sežana in the Littoral region of Slovenia.
