= Gradišče pri Štjaku =

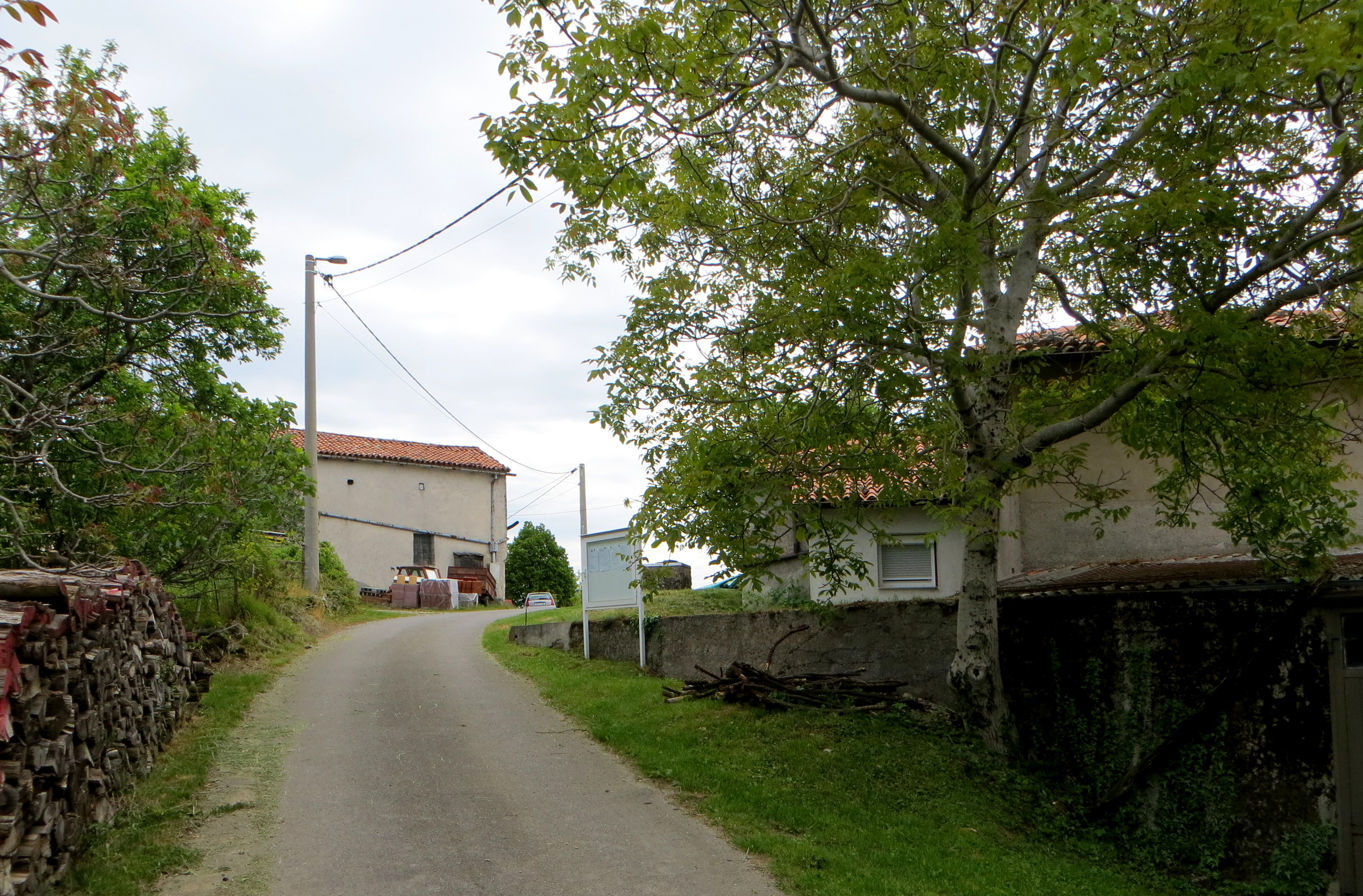

- Location in Slovenia
- Coordinates: 45°47′34.47″N 13°55′13″E
- Country: Slovenia
- Traditional region: Littoral
- Statistical region: Coastal–Karst
- Municipality: Sežana

Area
  - Total: 2.98 km^{2} (1.15 sq mi)
- Elevation: 597.5 m (1,960 ft)

Population (2002)
  - Total: 6

Gradišče pri Štjaku (pronounced [ɡɾaˈdiːʃtʃɛ pɾi ˈʃtjaːku]) is a small settlement east of Štjak in the Municipality of Sežana in the Littoral region of Slovenia.

== Name ==
The name of the settlement was changed from Gradišče to Gradišče pri Štjaku in 1953.
