= Kregolišče =

Slovenian village near the Mediterranean Sea

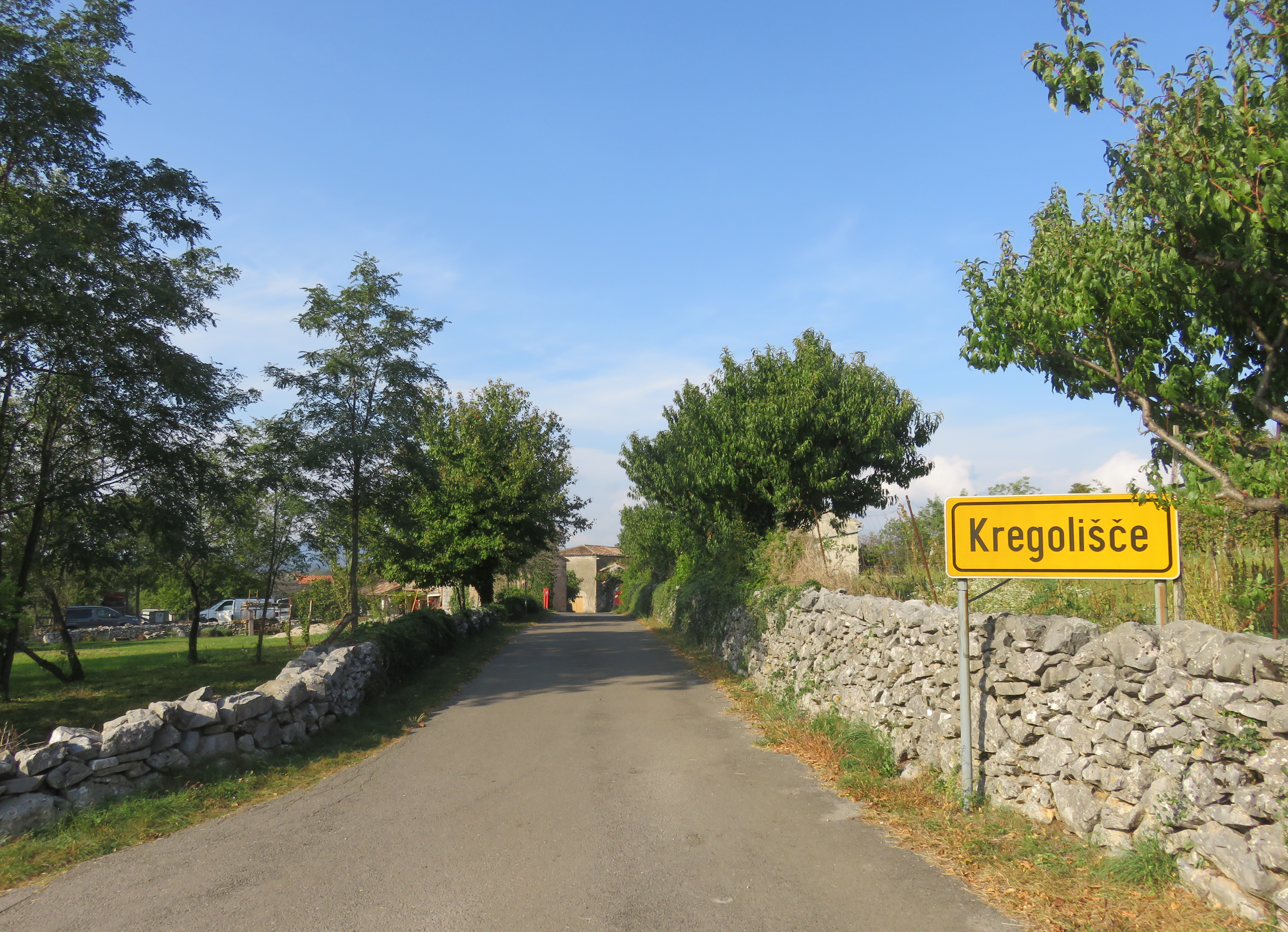

- Location in Slovenia
- Coordinates: 45°47′10.77″N 13°44′32.65″E
- Country: Slovenia
- Traditional region: Littoral
- Statistical region: Coastal–Karst
- Municipality: Sežana

Area
  - Total: 0.59 km^{2} (0.23 sq mi)
- Elevation: 249.3 m (818 ft)

Population (2002)
  - Total: 13

Kregolišče (pronounced [kɾɛɡɔˈliːʃtʃɛ]) is a small village in the Municipality of Sežana in the Littoral region of Slovenia, close to the border with Italy.
