= Hribi, Sežana =

Settlement in the Slovene Littoral, Slovenia

Hribi
- Location in Slovenia
- Coordinates: 45°46′49.19″N 13°54′46.09″E
- Country: Slovenia
- Traditional region: Littoral
- Statistical region: Coastal–Karst
- Municipality: Sežana

Area
  - Total: 0.88 km^{2} (0.34 sq mi)
- Elevation: 356.9 m (1,171 ft)

Population (2002)
  - Total: 4

Hribi (pronounced [ˈxɾiːbi]) is a small settlement above Mahniči in the Municipality of Sežana in the Littoral region of Slovenia.
