= Pristava, Sežana =

Pristava
- Location in Slovenia
- Coordinates: 45°46′58.05″N 13°54′23.7″E
- Country: Slovenia
- Traditional region: Littoral
- Statistical region: Coastal–Karst
- Municipality: Sežana

Area
  - Total: 0.36 km^{2} (0.14 sq mi)
- Elevation: 322.8 m (1,059 ft)

Population (2002)
  - Total: 4

Pristava (pronounced [pɾiˈstaːʋa]) is a small settlement above the village of Mahniči in the Municipality of Sežana in the Littoral region of Slovenia.
