= Šmarje pri Sežani =

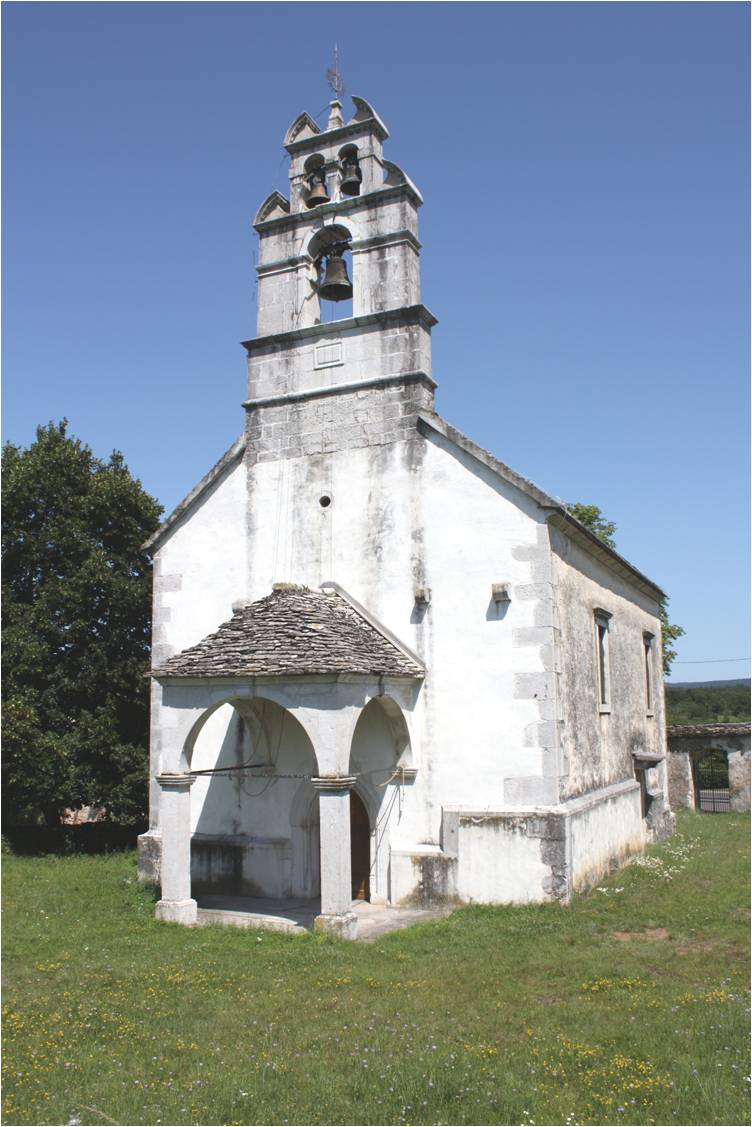

- Location in Slovenia
- Coordinates: 45°43′29.04″N 13°52′3.47″E
- Country: Slovenia
- Traditional region: Littoral
- Statistical region: Coastal–Karst
- Municipality: Sežana

Area
  - Total: 1.58 km^{2} (0.61 sq mi)
- Elevation: 303.4 m (995 ft)

Population (2002)
  - Total: 260

Šmarje pri Sežani (pronounced [ˈʃmaːɾjɛ pɾi sɛˈʒaːni]; Italian: Santa Maria di Sesana) is a settlement north of Sežana in the Littoral region of Slovenia. It is located in the heart of the Karst Plateau, close to the border with Italy, around 15 km from the city of Trieste.

== Name ==
The name of the settlement was changed from Šmarje to Šmarje pri Sežani in 1955.

== Church ==
The local church, from which the settlement gets its name, is dedicated to the Assumption of Mary and belongs to the Parish of Sežana.

== Trivia ==
The village features in the Dutch advertisement for a pension fund run by the insurance company Swiss Life.
