= Dane pri Sežani =

- Location in Slovenia
- Coordinates: 45°42′58.55″N 13°53′5.13″E
- Country: Slovenia
- Traditional region: Littoral
- Statistical region: Coastal–Karst
- Municipality: Sežana

Area
  - Total: 5.73 km^{2} (2.21 sq mi)
- Elevation: 345.6 m (1,134 ft)

Population (2002)
  - Total: 400

Dane pri Sežani (pronounced [ˈdaːnɛ pɾi sɛˈʒaːni]; Italian: Danna) is a settlement just outside Sežana in the Littoral region of Slovenia.
