= Gorenje pri Divači =

- Location in Slovenia
- Coordinates: 45°41′33.6″N 13°56′56.08″E
- Country: Slovenia
- Traditional region: Littoral
- Statistical region: Coastal–Karst
- Municipality: Sežana

Area
  - Total: 7.85 km^{2} (3.03 sq mi)
- Elevation: 413.7 m (1,357 ft)

Population (2002)
  - Total: 124

Gorenje pri Divači (pronounced [ɡɔˈɾeːnjɛ pɾi diˈʋaːtʃi]; Italian: Goregna) is a settlement northwest of Divača in the Littoral region of Slovenia. It lies within the Municipality of Sežana.

== Name ==
The name of the settlement was changed from Gorenje to Gorenje pri Divači in 1955.
