= Vrhovlje, Sežana =

Vrhovlje
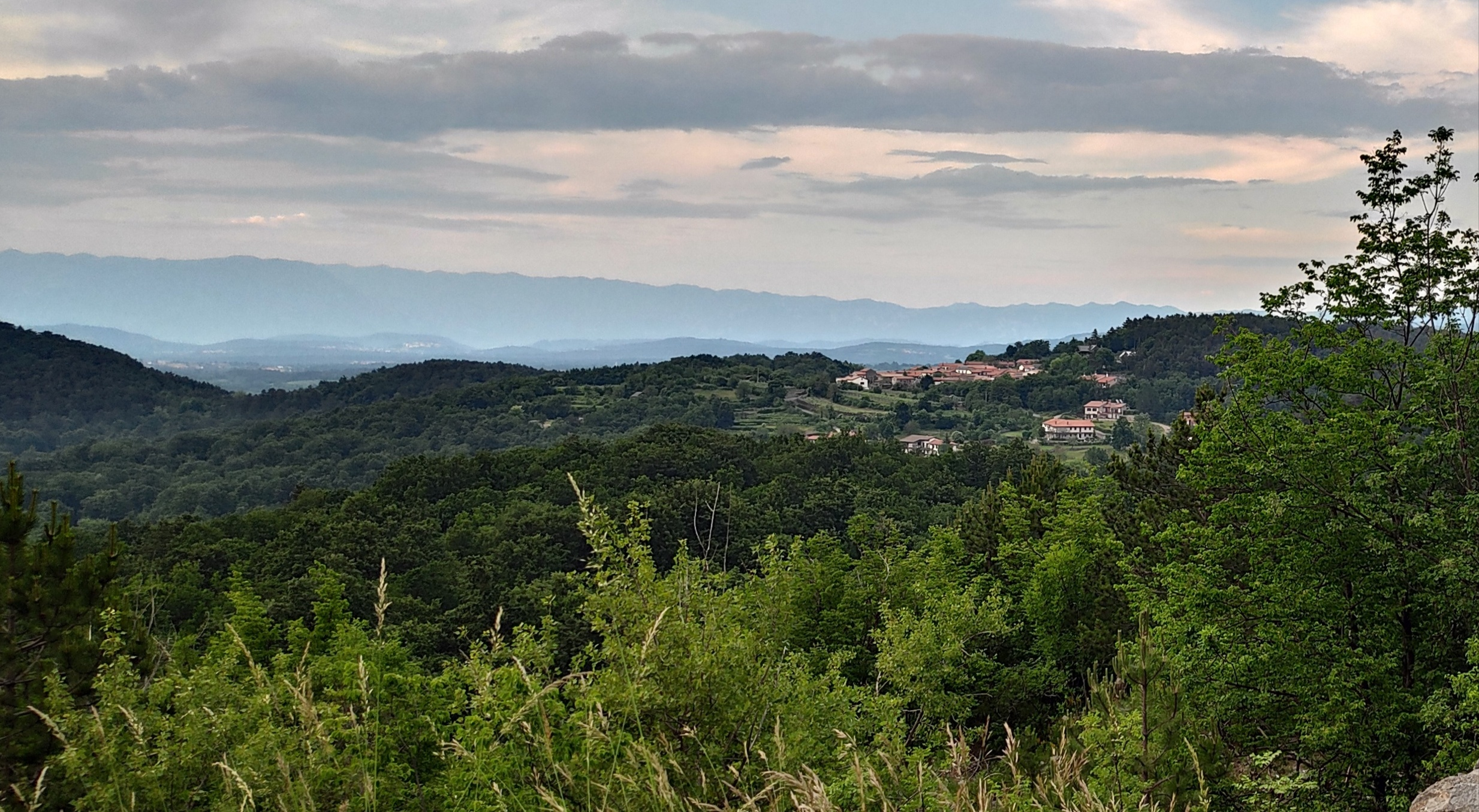

- Location in Slovenia
- Coordinates: 45°43′39.43″N 13°49′25.08″E
- Country: Slovenia
- Traditional region: Littoral
- Statistical region: Coastal–Karst
- Municipality: Sežana

Area
  - Total: 2.34 km^{2} (0.90 sq mi)
- Elevation: 376.6 m (1,236 ft)

Population (2002)
  - Total: 90

Vrhovlje (pronounced [ʋəɾˈxoːu̯ljɛ]; Italian: Vercogliano) is a settlement in the Municipality of Sežana in the Littoral region of Slovenia right on the border with Italy.
