= Majcni =

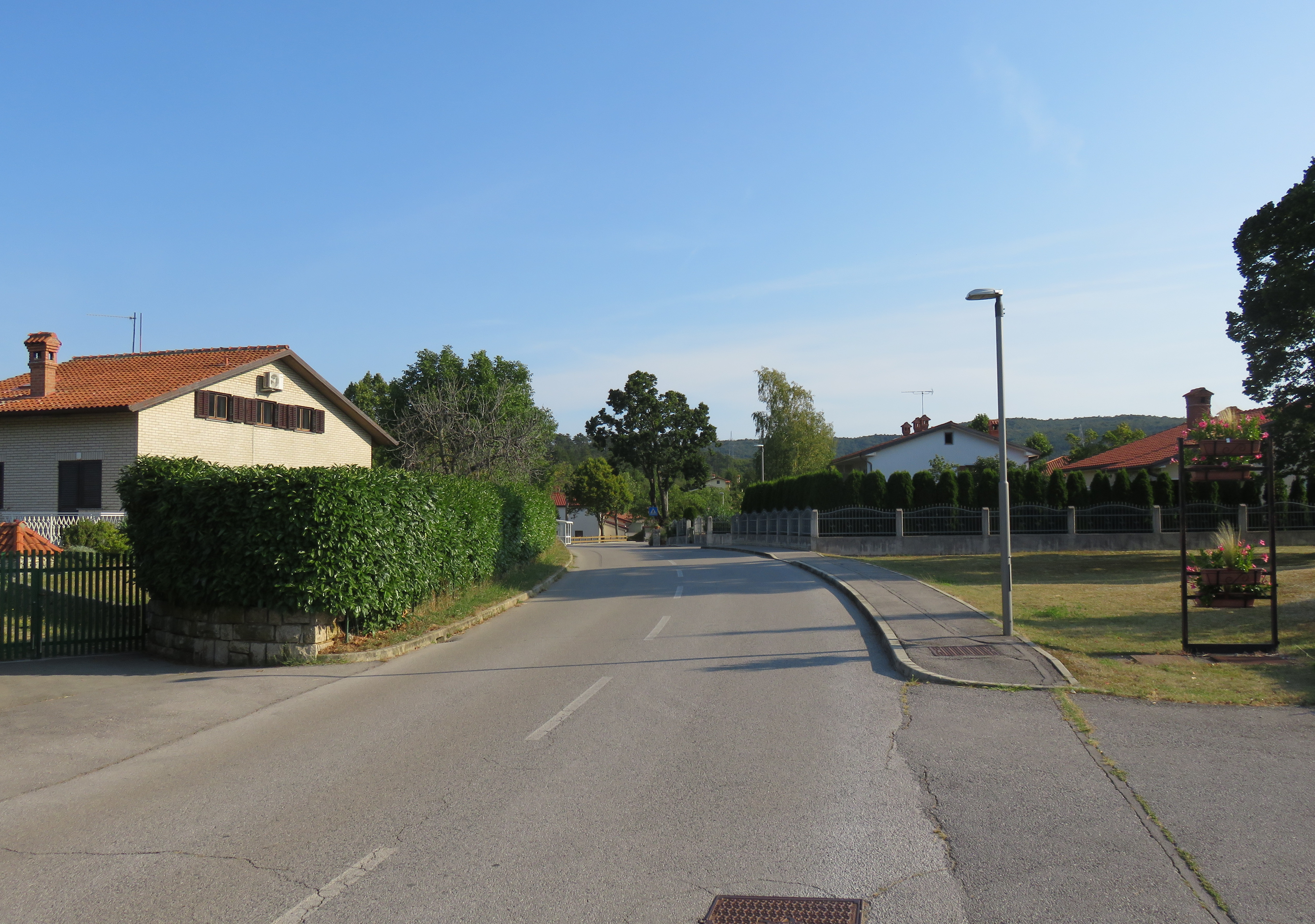

- Location in Slovenia
- Coordinates: 45°44′45.28″N 13°56′10.85″E
- Country: Slovenia
- Traditional region: Littoral
- Statistical region: Coastal–Karst
- Municipality: Sežana

Area
  - Total: 1.31 km^{2} (0.51 sq mi)
- Elevation: 368.8 m (1,210 ft)

Population (2002)
  - Total: 73
- Postal code: 6210

Majcni (pronounced [ˈmaːi̯tsni]) is a small settlement northeast of Štorje in the Municipality of Sežana in the Littoral region of Slovenia.
