= Tublje pri Komnu =

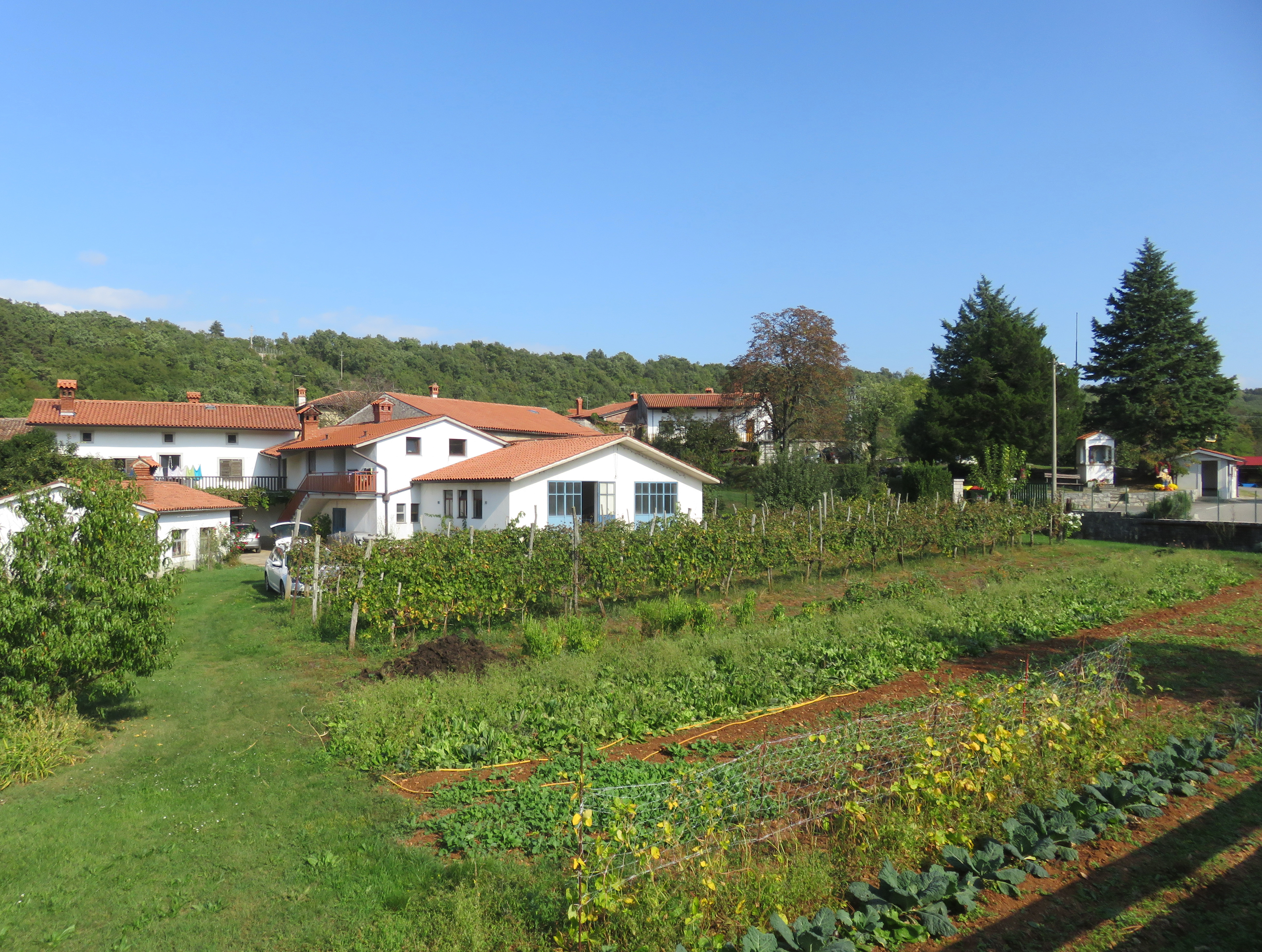

- Location in Slovenia
- Coordinates: 45°46′31.48″N 13°44′24.27″E
- Country: Slovenia
- Traditional region: Littoral
- Statistical region: Coastal–Karst
- Municipality: Sežana

Area
  - Total: 2.9 km^{2} (1.1 sq mi)
- Elevation: 195.8 m (642 ft)

Population (2002)
  - Total: 44

Tublje pri Komnu (pronounced [ˈtuːbljɛ pɾi ˈkoːmnu]; Italian: Tuble) is a small settlement in the Municipality of Sežana in the Littoral region of Slovenia close to the border with Italy.

== Name ==
The name of the settlement was changed from Tublje to Tublje pri Komnu in 1953.

== First World War cemeteries ==
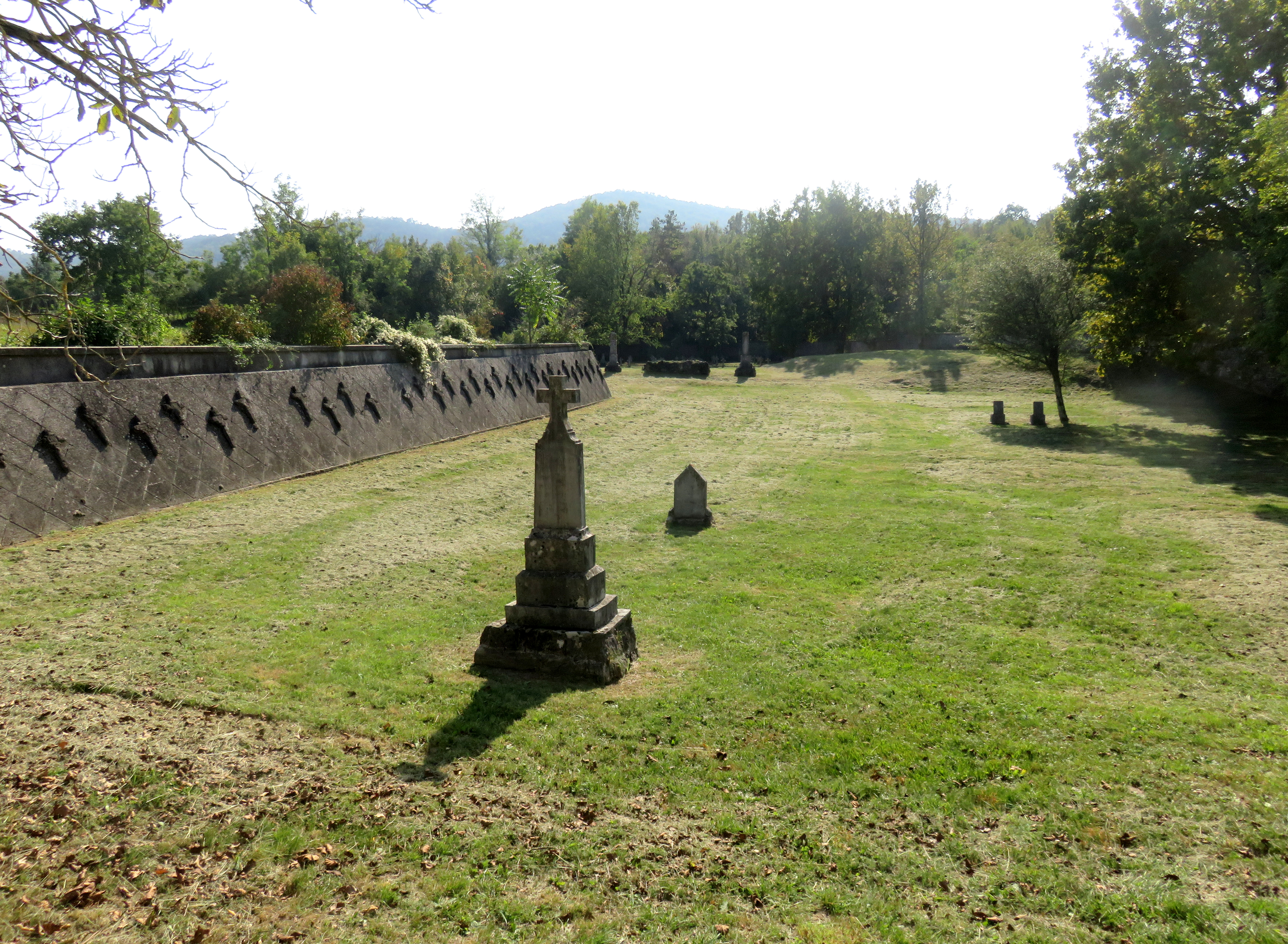
First World War cemetery

There are three cemeteries from the First World War in Tublje pri Komnu. They lie northwest of the village, close to Brje pri Komnu. The first cemetery lies next to the main road and contains the remains of about 2,300 soldiers. The second cemetery lies about 200 metres (660 ft) west of the first and contains the remains of about 1,500 soldiers. The third cemetery lies about 60 metres (200 ft) southwest of the second one. A fourth cemetery is located northeast of these in neighboring Brje pri Komnu.
