= Krajna Vas =

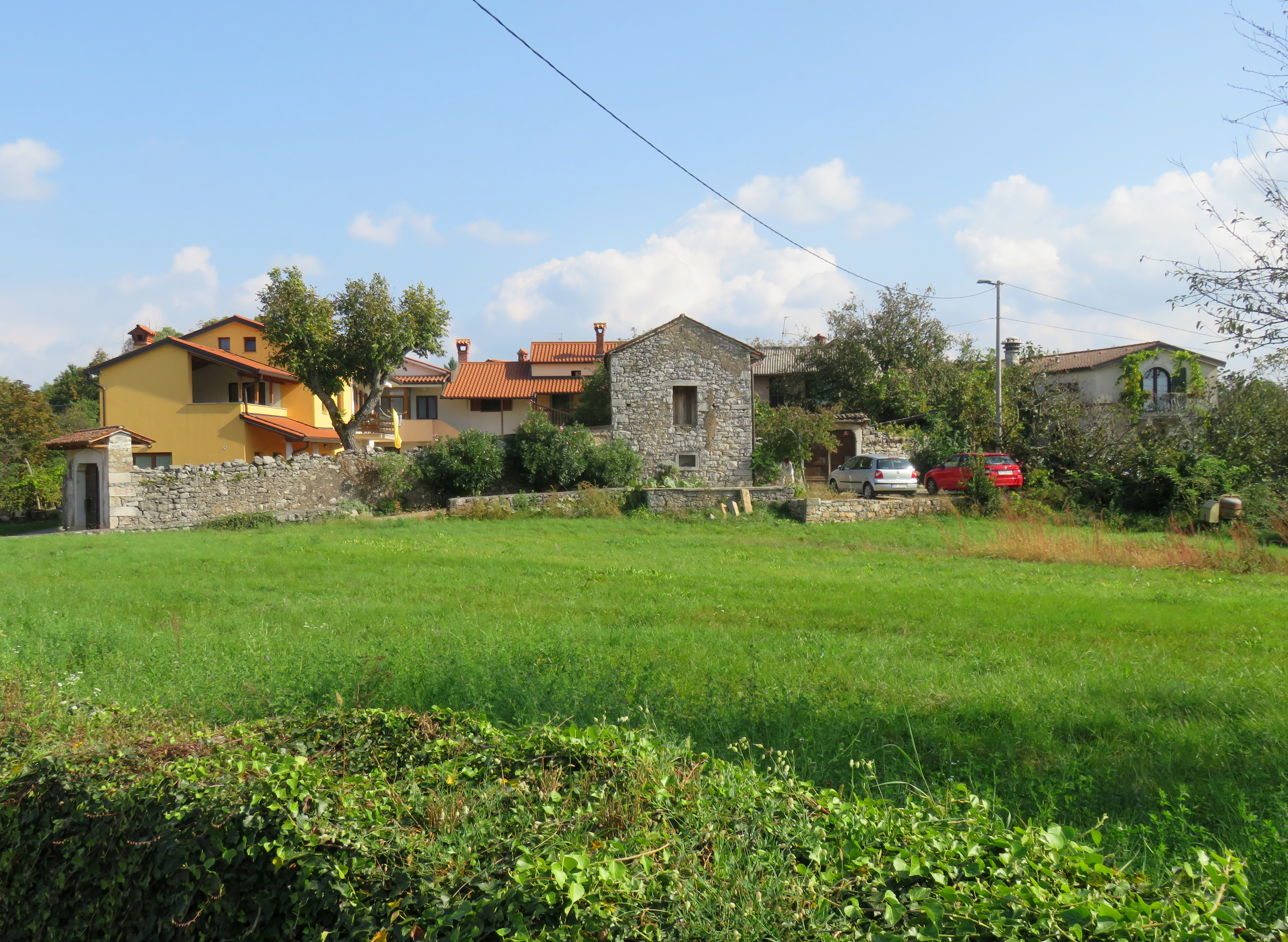

- Location in Slovenia
- Coordinates: 45°46′8.98″N 13°48′12.05″E
- Country: Slovenia
- Traditional region: Littoral
- Statistical region: Coastal–Karst
- Municipality: Sežana

Area
  - Total: 3.47 km^{2} (1.34 sq mi)
- Elevation: 269.8 m (885 ft)

Population (2002)
  - Total: 118

Krajna Vas (pronounced [ˈkɾaːi̯na ˈʋaːs]; Slovene: Krajna vas) is a village in the Municipality of Sežana in the Littoral region of Slovenia, close to the border with Italy.

== Church ==
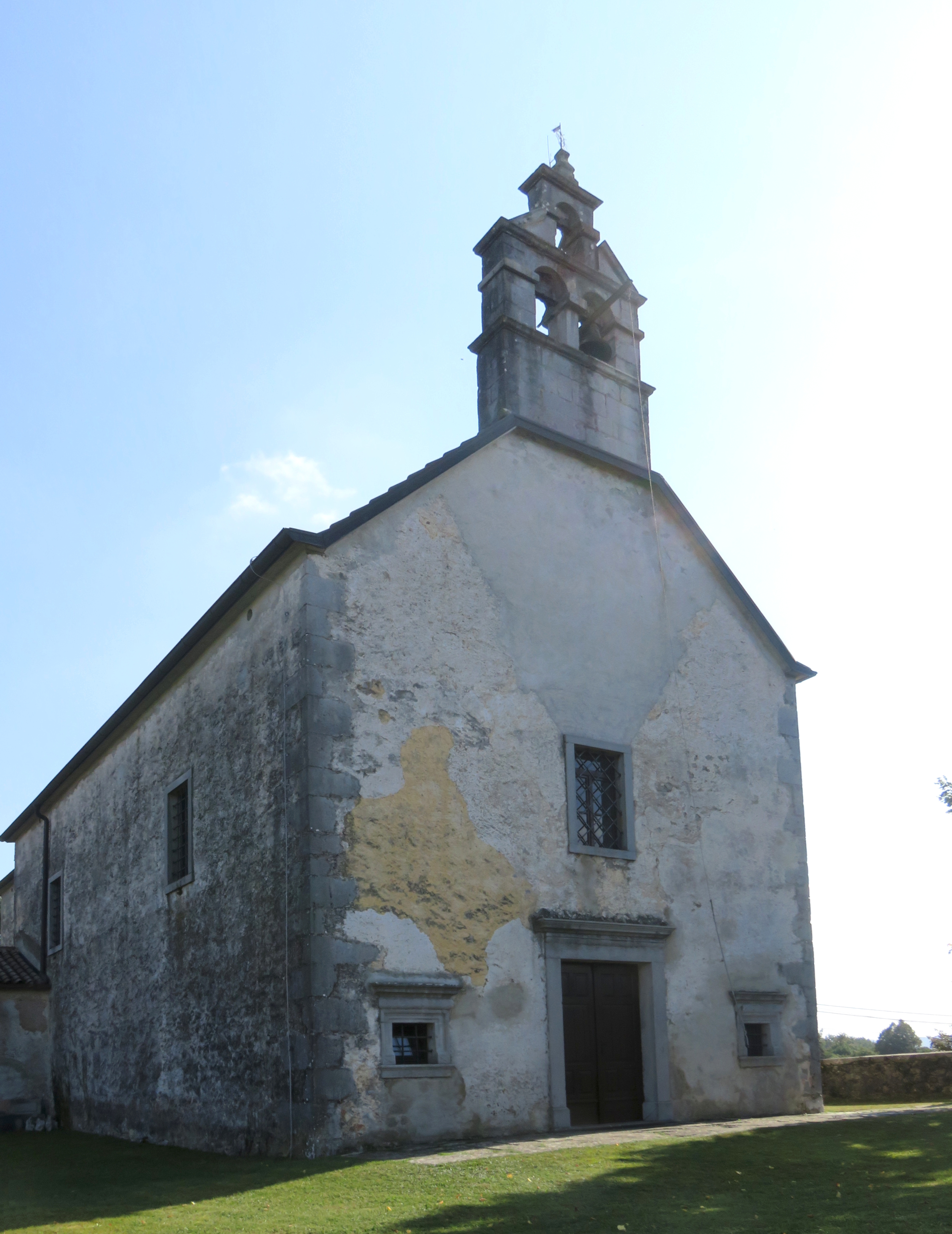
Saint Agnes's Church

The church in the settlement is dedicated to Saint Agnes and belongs to the Parish of Skopo.
