= Stomaž, Sežana =

Stomaž
- Location in Slovenia
- Coordinates: 45°46′26.07″N 13°55′42.09″E
- Country: Slovenia
- Traditional region: Littoral
- Statistical region: Coastal–Karst
- Municipality: Sežana

Area
  - Total: 1.05 km^{2} (0.41 sq mi)
- Elevation: 407.6 m (1,337 ft)

Population (2002)
  - Total: 32

Stomaž (pronounced [ˈstoːmaʃ]) is a small village in the Municipality of Sežana in the Littoral region of Slovenia.

The local church, built slightly outside the village, is dedicated to Saint Thomas and belongs to the Parish of Vrabče.
