= Poljane pri Štjaku =

- Location in Slovenia
- Coordinates: 45°46′46.07″N 13°55′32.45″E
- Country: Slovenia
- Traditional region: Littoral
- Statistical region: Coastal–Karst
- Municipality: Sežana

Area
  - Total: 1.16 km^{2} (0.45 sq mi)
- Elevation: 485.7 m (1,594 ft)

Population (2002)
  - Total: 6

Poljane pri Štjaku (pronounced [pɔˈljaːnɛ pɾi ˈʃtjaːku]) is a small settlement southeast of Štjak in the Municipality of Sežana in the Littoral region of Slovenia.

== Name ==
The name of the settlement was changed from Poljane to Poljane pri Štjaku in 1953.
