= Prelože pri Lokvi =

- Location in Slovenia
- Coordinates: 45°39′10.38″N 13°56′6.57″E
- Country: Slovenia
- Traditional region: Littoral
- Statistical region: Coastal–Karst
- Municipality: Sežana
- Elevation: 499.9 m (1,640 ft)

Population (2002)
  - Total: 81

Prelože pri Lokvi (pronounced [pɾɛˈloːʒɛ pɾi ˈloːkʋi]) is a settlement south of Lokev in the Municipality of Sežana in the Littoral region of Slovenia.

== Geography ==
Prelože pri Lokvi is a clustered village on a small road that connects it to Lokev. It is bordered to the south by Obrovnik Hill (700 m), Big Gradišče Hill (Slovene: Veliko Gradišče, 742 m), and Golac Hill (688 m). Big Gradišče Hill is known locally as na Vročah and is the highest part of the Trieste–Komen Karst region. The hills are covered by low Karst forest, including a high percentage of spruce, introduced in 1896.

== Name ==
The name of the settlement was changed from Prelože to Prelože pri Lokvi in 1955. The name Prelože is a plural form contracted from the demonym *Predložane, in turn based on the prepositional phrase pred log 'in front of the wooded area'. The name thus originally means 'people living in front of a wooded place'. The surname Mljač is particularly common in the village.

== History ==
Big Gradišče Hill was already settled in prehistoric times and has the remains of an extensive hill fortification. According to oral tradition, the fortification was destroyed by Attila the Hun. Prelože pri Lokvi itself is an old settlement, and the ruins of a house in the village have the year 1566 carved on them. Folk tradition relates that the village originally stood 2 kilometers (1.2 mi) to the west at Merišče, where there are extensive moraines and the area is much more exposed to the bora wind. A concrete-lined water reservoir with a cleaner was installed in 1939 to supply water to the village. In the mid-20th century many of the villagers emigrated to the United States.

=== Mass grave ===
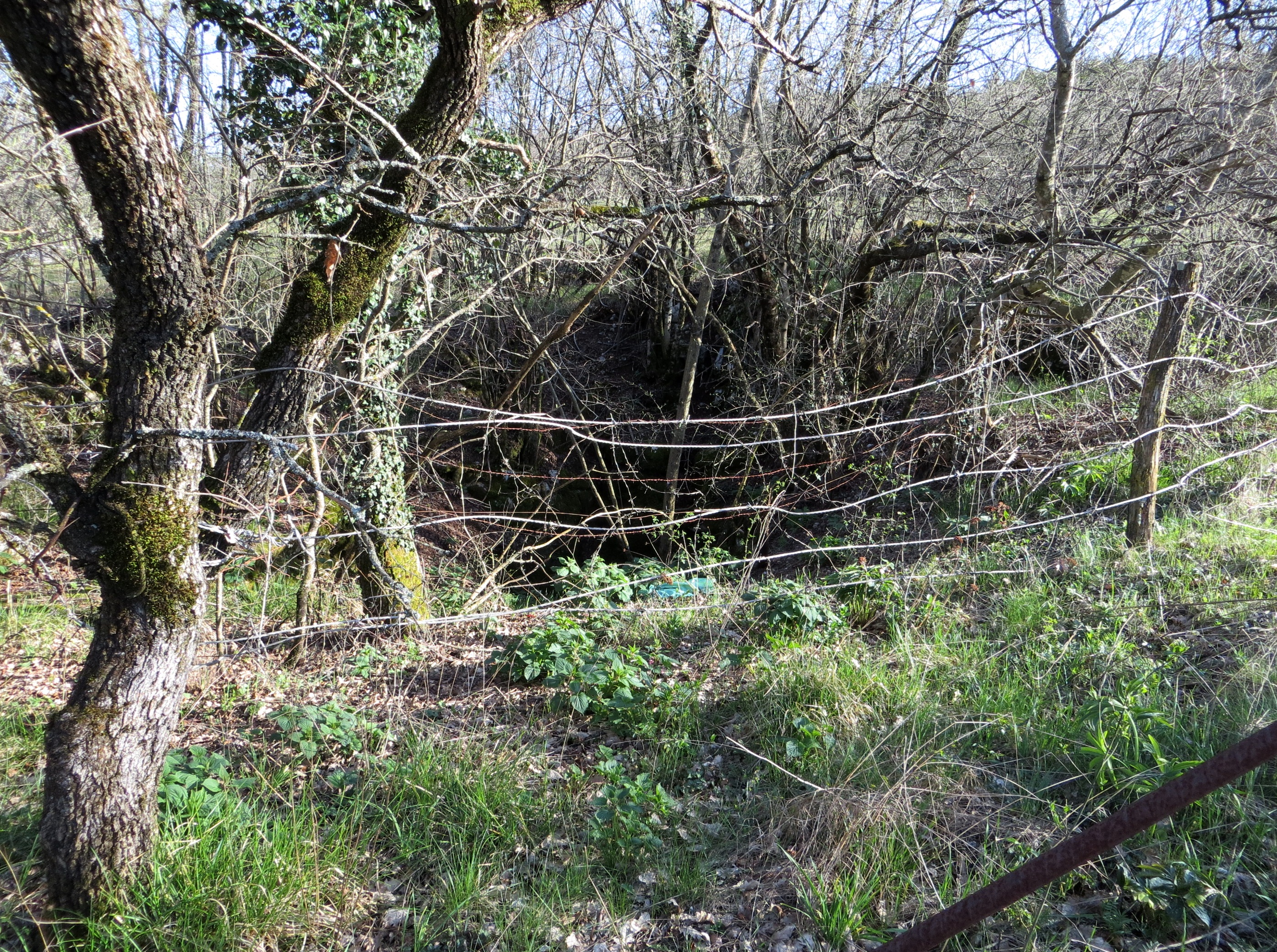
Golobivnica Cave Mass Grave

Prelože pri Lokvi is the site of a mass grave associated with the Second World War. The Golobivnica Cave Mass Grave (Slovene: Grobišče Jama Golobivnica) is located about 1 kilometer (0.62 mi) east of Lokev. It is a shaft that contains the remains of local civilians murdered during the war and also civilians from Trieste and the surrounding area that were murdered after the war. It is estimated that the shaft contains the remains of up to 250 victims.
