= Sela, Sežana =

Sela
- Location in Slovenia
- Coordinates: 45°46′17.15″N 13°55′58″E
- Country: Slovenia
- Traditional region: Littoral
- Statistical region: Coastal–Karst
- Municipality: Sežana

Area
  - Total: 1.34 km^{2} (0.52 sq mi)
- Elevation: 415.3 m (1,363 ft)

Population (2002)
  - Total: 48

Sela (pronounced [ˈseːla]) is a small village in the Municipality of Sežana, in the Littoral region of Slovenia.
