= Brestovica pri Povirju =

- Location in Slovenia
- Coordinates: 45°42′57.43″N 13°56′48.95″E
- Country: Slovenia
- Traditional region: Littoral
- Statistical region: Coastal–Karst
- Municipality: Sežana

Area
  - Total: 6.82 km^{2} (2.63 sq mi)
- Elevation: 422.2 m (1,385 ft)

Population (2002)
  - Total: 51

Brestovica pri Povirju (pronounced [ˈbɾeːstɔʋitsa pɾi pɔˈʋiːɾju]; Italian: Brestovizza) is a small settlement north of Povir in the Municipality of Sežana in the Littoral region of Slovenia.

== Name ==
The name of the settlement was changed from Brestovica to Brestovica pri Povirju in 1953.

== Notable people ==
Notable people that were born or lived in Brestovica pri Povirju include:

- France Rebec (1841 – after 1871), journalist and translator
