= Dobravlje, Sežana =

Dobravlje
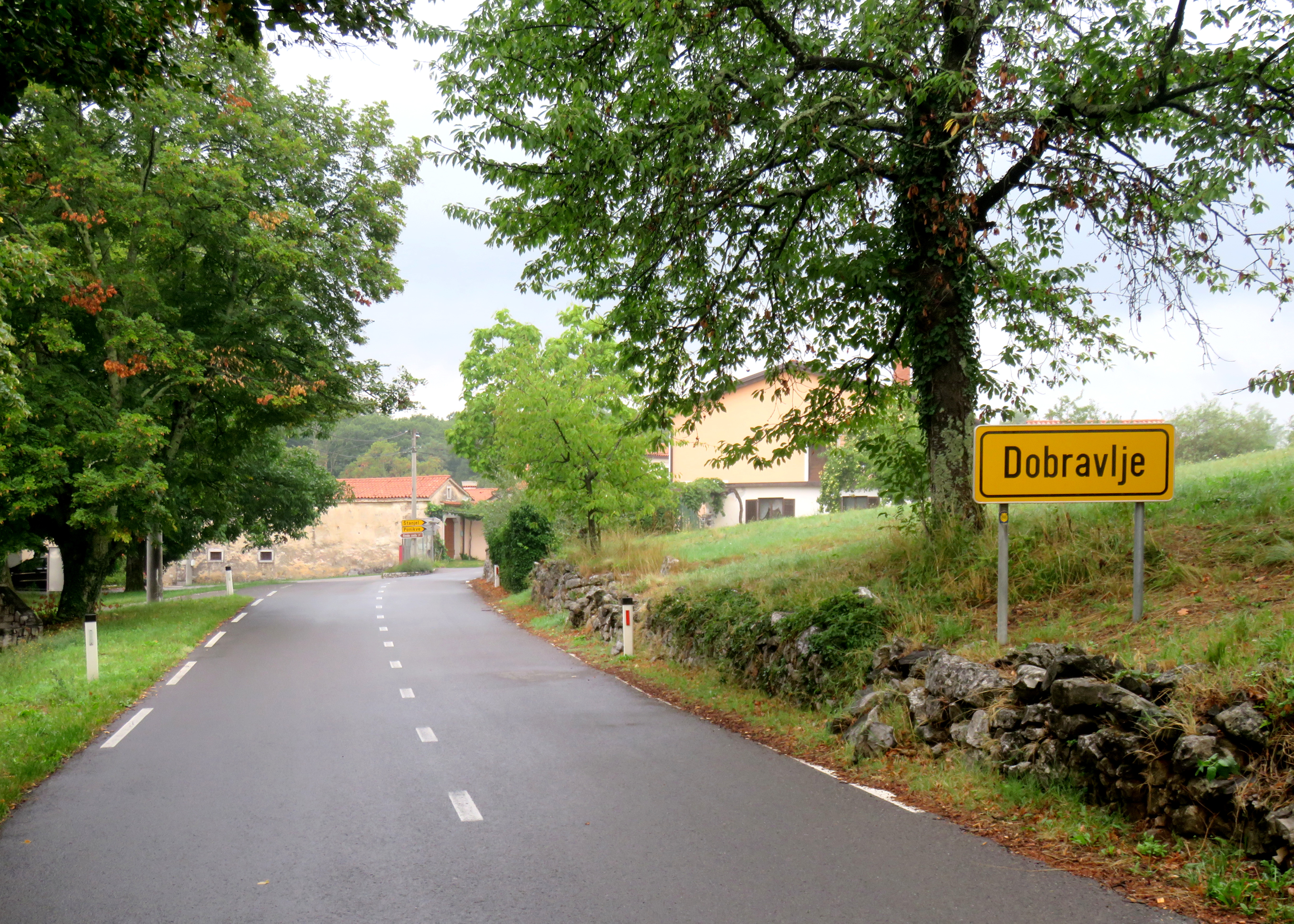

- Location in Slovenia
- Coordinates: 45°45′54.73″N 13°53′0.7″E
- Country: Slovenia
- Traditional region: Littoral
- Statistical region: Coastal–Karst
- Municipality: Sežana

Area
  - Total: 1.64 km^{2} (0.63 sq mi)
- Elevation: 324.7 m (1,065 ft)

Population (2002)
  - Total: 88

Dobravlje (pronounced [dɔˈbɾaːu̯ljɛ]) is a settlement northeast of Tomaj in the Municipality of Sežana in the Littoral region of Slovenia.
