= Gradnje, Sežana =

Gradnje
- Location in Slovenia
- Coordinates: 45°46′45.01″N 13°53′7.57″E
- Country: Slovenia
- Traditional region: Littoral
- Statistical region: Coastal–Karst
- Municipality: Sežana

Area
  - Total: 1.47 km^{2} (0.57 sq mi)
- Elevation: 389.4 m (1,278 ft)

Population (2002)
  - Total: 11

Gradnje (pronounced [ˈɡɾaːdnjɛ]) is a small settlement in the Municipality of Sežana in the Littoral region of Slovenia.
