= Razguri =

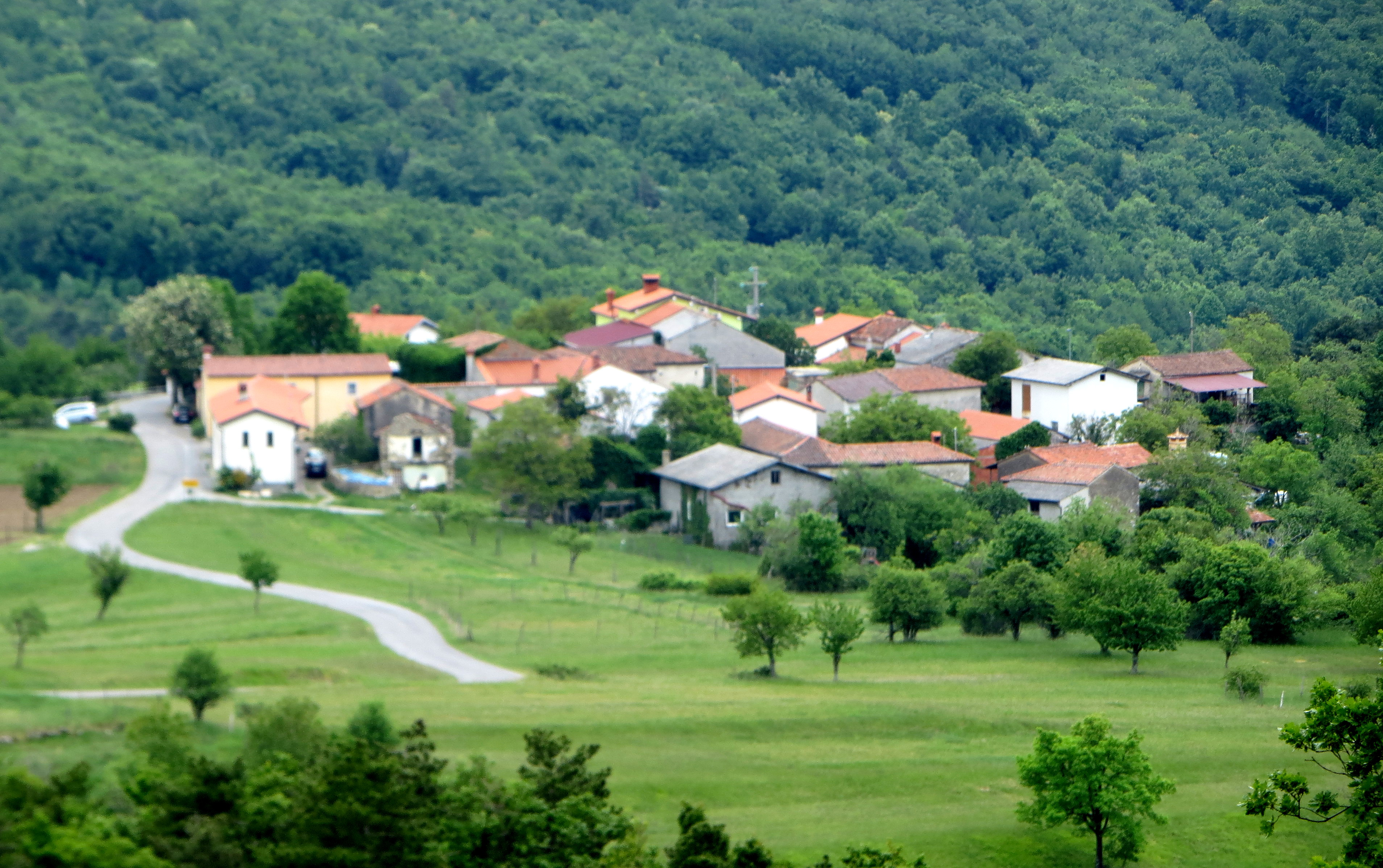

- Location in Slovenia
- Coordinates: 45°46′44.86″N 13°56′16.45″E
- Country: Slovenia
- Traditional region: Littoral
- Statistical region: Coastal–Karst
- Municipality: Sežana

Area
  - Total: 1.05 km^{2} (0.41 sq mi)
- Elevation: 501.2 m (1,644 ft)

Population (2002)
  - Total: 30

Razguri (pronounced [ɾaˈzɡuːɾi]) is a settlement in the Municipality of Sežana in the Littoral region of Slovenia.

== Church ==
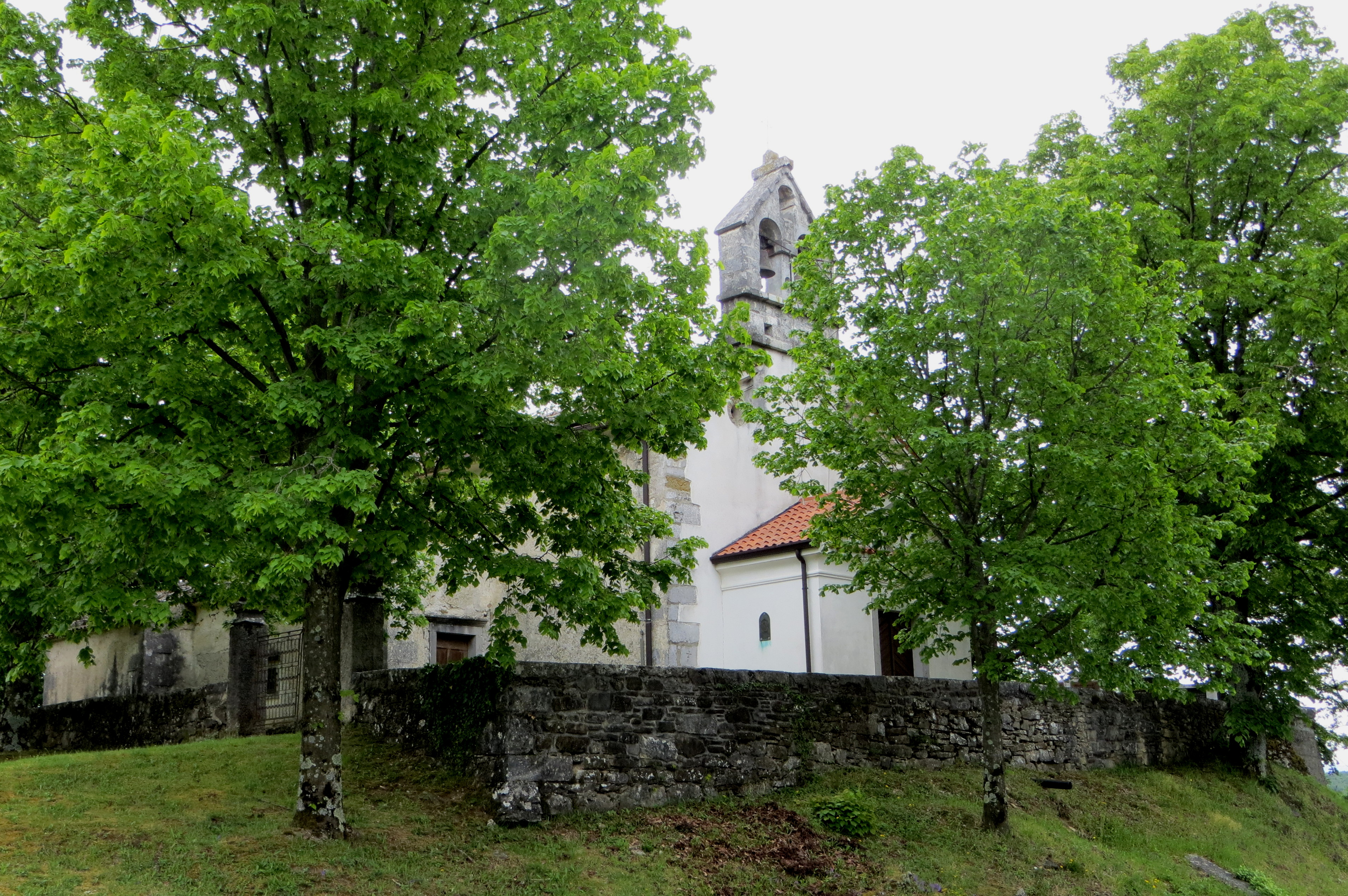
Saint Anne's Church

The local church, built outside the settlement, is dedicated to Saint Anne and belongs to the Parish of Vrabče.
