= Senadolice =

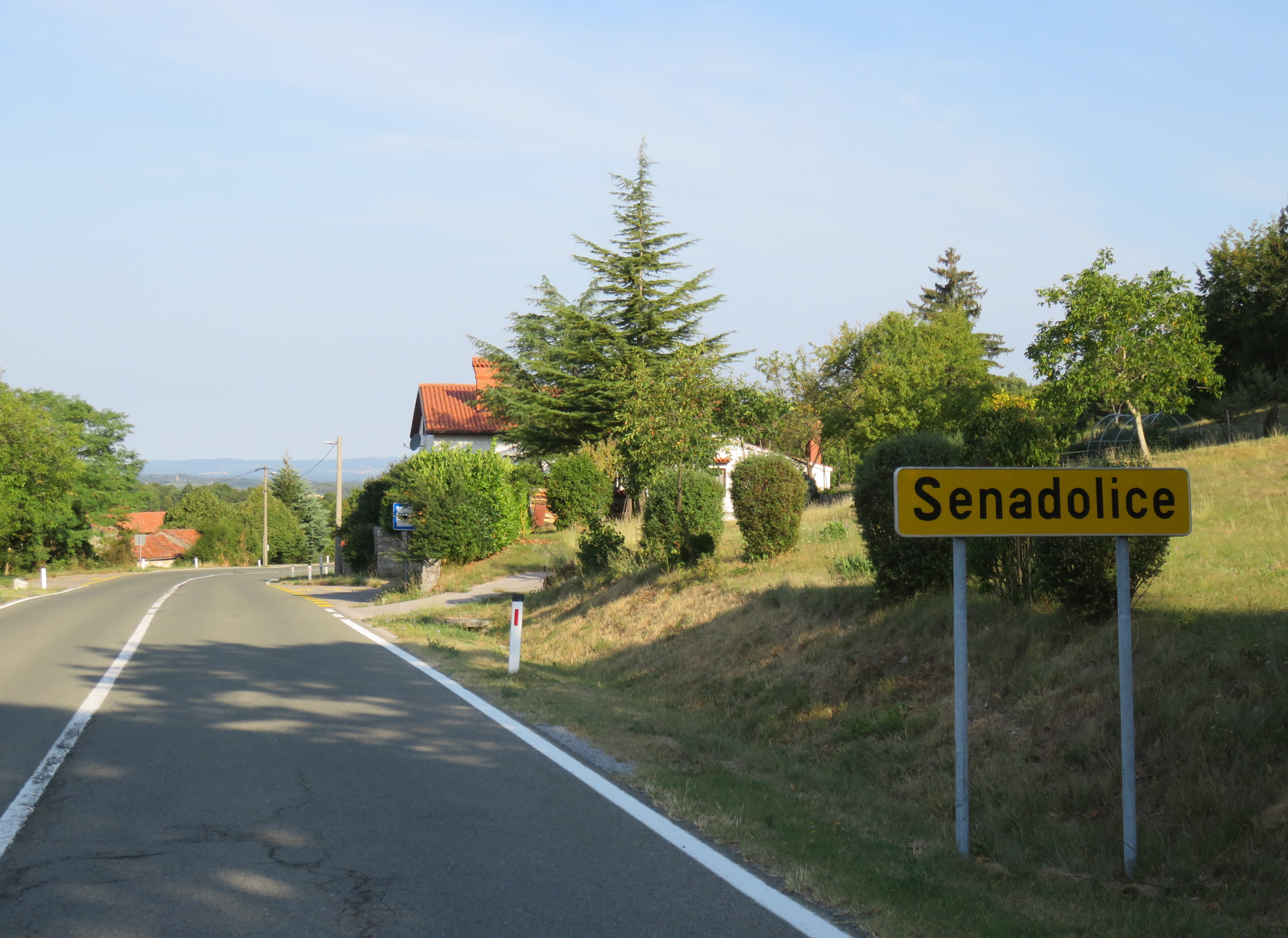

- Location in Slovenia
- Coordinates: 45°43′50.13″N 13°57′37.44″E
- Country: Slovenia
- Traditional region: Littoral
- Statistical region: Coastal–Karst
- Municipality: Sežana

Area
  - Total: 3.01 km^{2} (1.16 sq mi)
- Elevation: 452.2 m (1,484 ft)

Population (2002)
  - Total: 13

Senadolice (pronounced [sɛnaˈdoːlitsɛ]) is a small settlement between Senadole and Štorje in the Municipality of Sežana in the Littoral region of Slovenia.
