= Dol pri Vogljah =

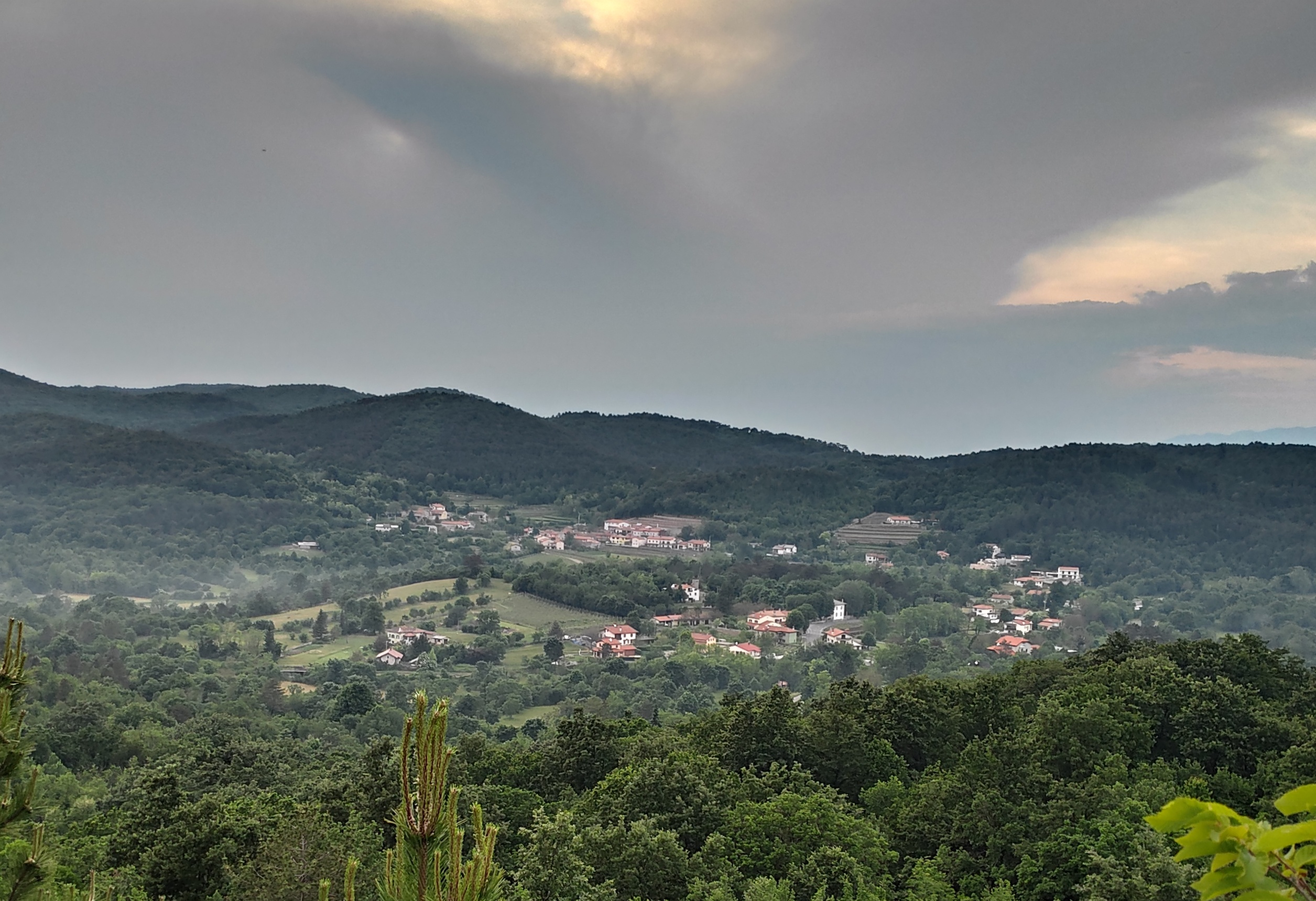
- Dol pri Vogljah (bottom) and the nearby village of Voglje

- Location in Slovenia
- Coordinates: 45°43′39.38″N 13°48′48.54″E
- Country: Slovenia
- Traditional region: Littoral
- Statistical region: Coastal–Karst
- Municipality: Sežana

Area
  - Total: 0.68 km^{2} (0.26 sq mi)
- Elevation: 316.5 m (1,038 ft)

Population (2002)
  - Total: 87

Dol pri Vogljah (pronounced [ˈdoːu̯ pɾi ˈʋoːɡljax]) is a settlement in the Municipality of Sežana in the Littoral region of Slovenia on the border with Italy.
