= Municipality of Sežana =

Municipality of Slovenia

Municipality of Sežana Občina Sežana
- Municipality
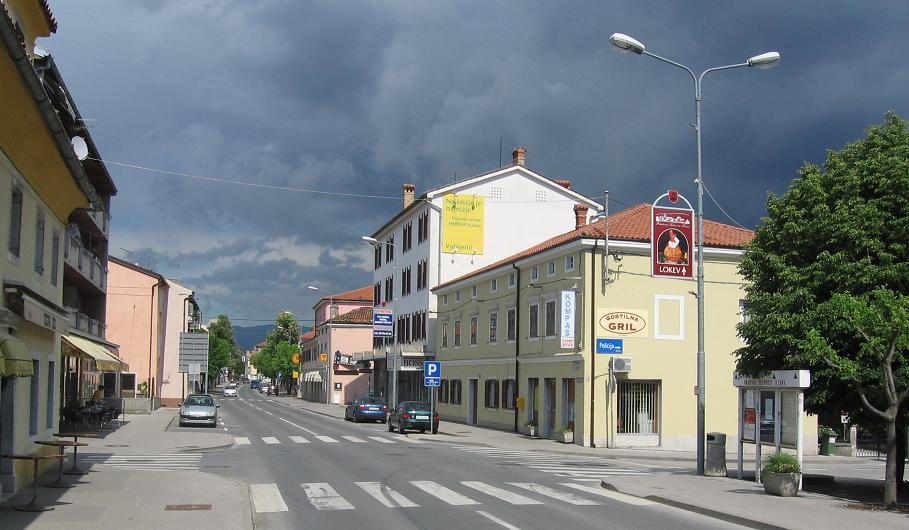

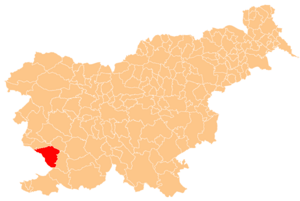
- Location of the Municipality of Sežana in Slovenia
- Coordinates: 45°44′N 13°53′E
- Country: Slovenia

Government
  - Mayor: Andrej Sila

Area
  - Total: 217.4 km^{2} (83.9 sq mi)

Population (2002)
  - Total: 12,583
  - Density: 57.88/km^{2} (149.9/sq mi)
- Time zone: UTC+01 (CET)
  - Summer (DST): UTC+02 (CEST)
- Website: www.sezana.si

The Municipality of Sežana (pronounced [sɛˈʒaːna]; Slovene: Občina Sežana) is a municipality in the Littoral region of Slovenia, near the Italian border. The seat of the municipality is the town of Sežana. The municipality was established on 6 November 1994, when the former Municipality of Sežana was split into four smaller municipalities (Divača, Komen, Hrpelje-Kozina, and Sežana). It borders Italy.

== Settlements ==
In addition to the municipal seat of Sežana, the municipality also includes the following settlements:

- Avber
- Bogo
- Brestovica pri Povirju
- Brje pri Koprivi
- Dane pri Sežani
- Dobravlje
- Dol pri Vogljah
- Dolenje
- Dutovlje
- Filipčje Brdo
- Godnje
- Gorenje pri Divači
- Gradišče pri Štjaku
- Gradnje
- Grahovo Brdo
- Griže
- Hribi
- Jakovce
- Kazlje
- Kopriva
- Kosovelje
- Krajna Vas
- Kregolišče
- Kreplje
- Križ
- Krtinovica
- Lipica
- Lokev
- Mahniči
- Majcni
- Merče
- Nova Vas
- Orlek
- Plešivica
- Pliskovica
- Podbreže
- Poljane pri Štjaku
- Ponikve
- Povir
- Prelože pri Lokvi
- Pristava
- Raša
- Ravnje
- Razguri
- Sela
- Selo
- Senadolice
- Šepulje
- Skopo
- Šmarje pri Sežani
- Štjak
- Stomaž
- Štorje
- Tabor
- Tomaj
- Tublje pri Komnu
- Utovlje
- Veliki Dol
- Veliko Polje
- Voglje
- Vrabče
- Vrhovlje
- Žirje

== History ==
Slavic tribes, ancestors of modern Slovenes, first settled the area in the late 6th century AD. In the Middle Ages, the area belonged to the Duchy of Friuli and the Patriarchate of Aquileia, until it was conquered by the Counts of Gorizia in the 14th century. In 1500, it fell under the Habsburg dominion and it was included in the County of Gorizia and Gradisca.

== Sights ==
- The Lipica Stud Farm is located in the municipality, as are several picturesque villages.
- Karst Living Museum
- Cave Vilenica
- Botanical garden in Sežana
- Pepa's Karst garden in Dutovlje
- Kosovel memorial room in Sežana and homestead in Tomaj
- Military museum in Lokev
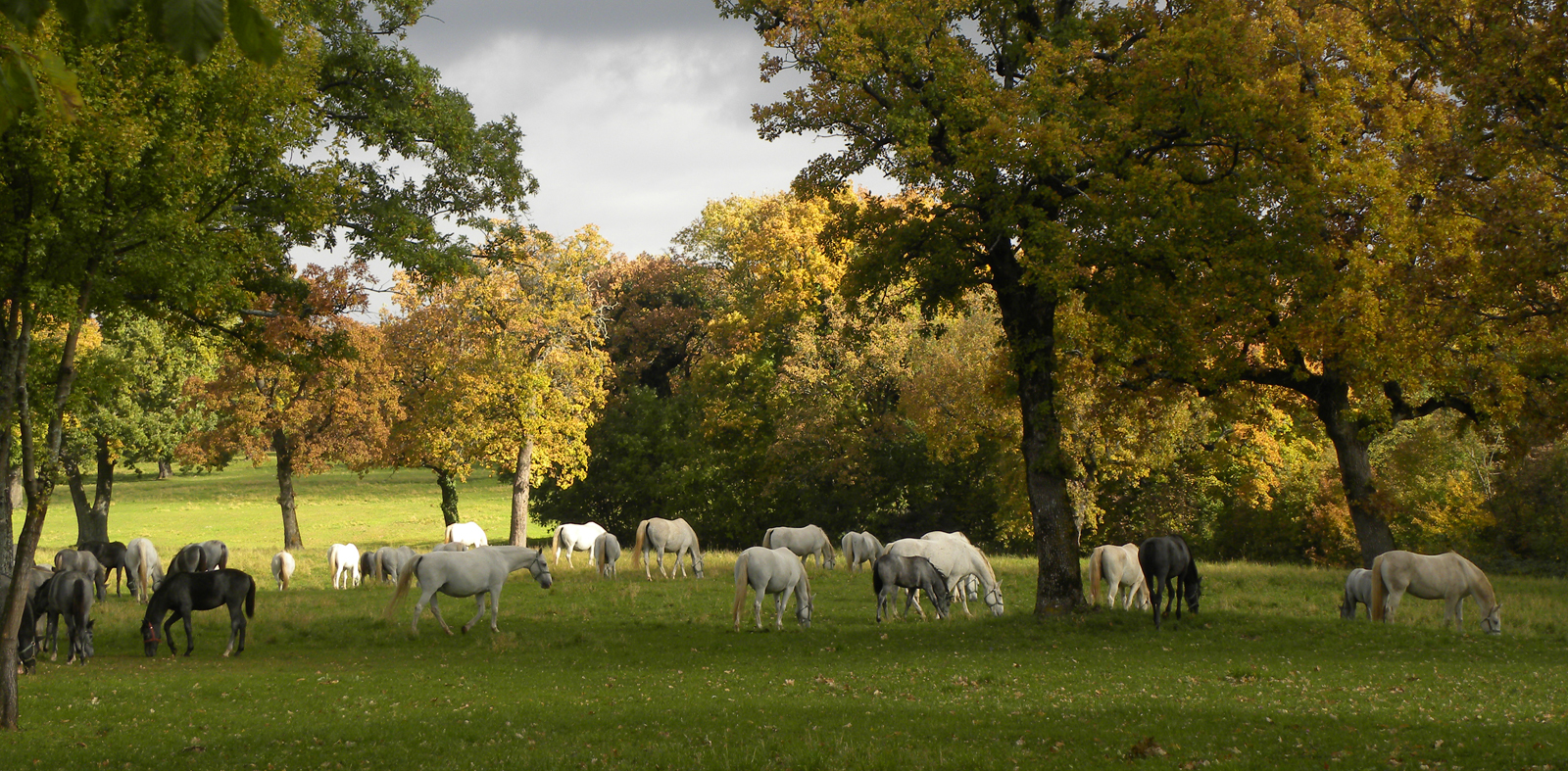
Lipica Stud Farm

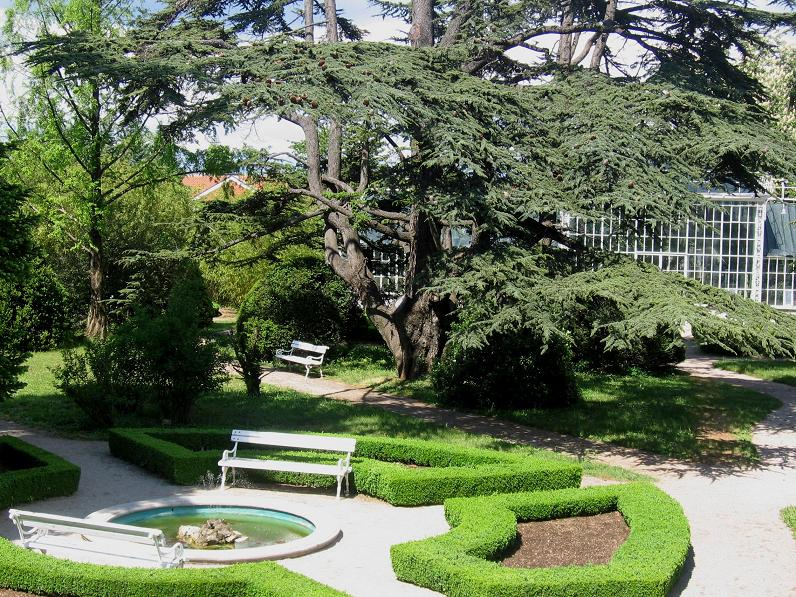
Botanical garden

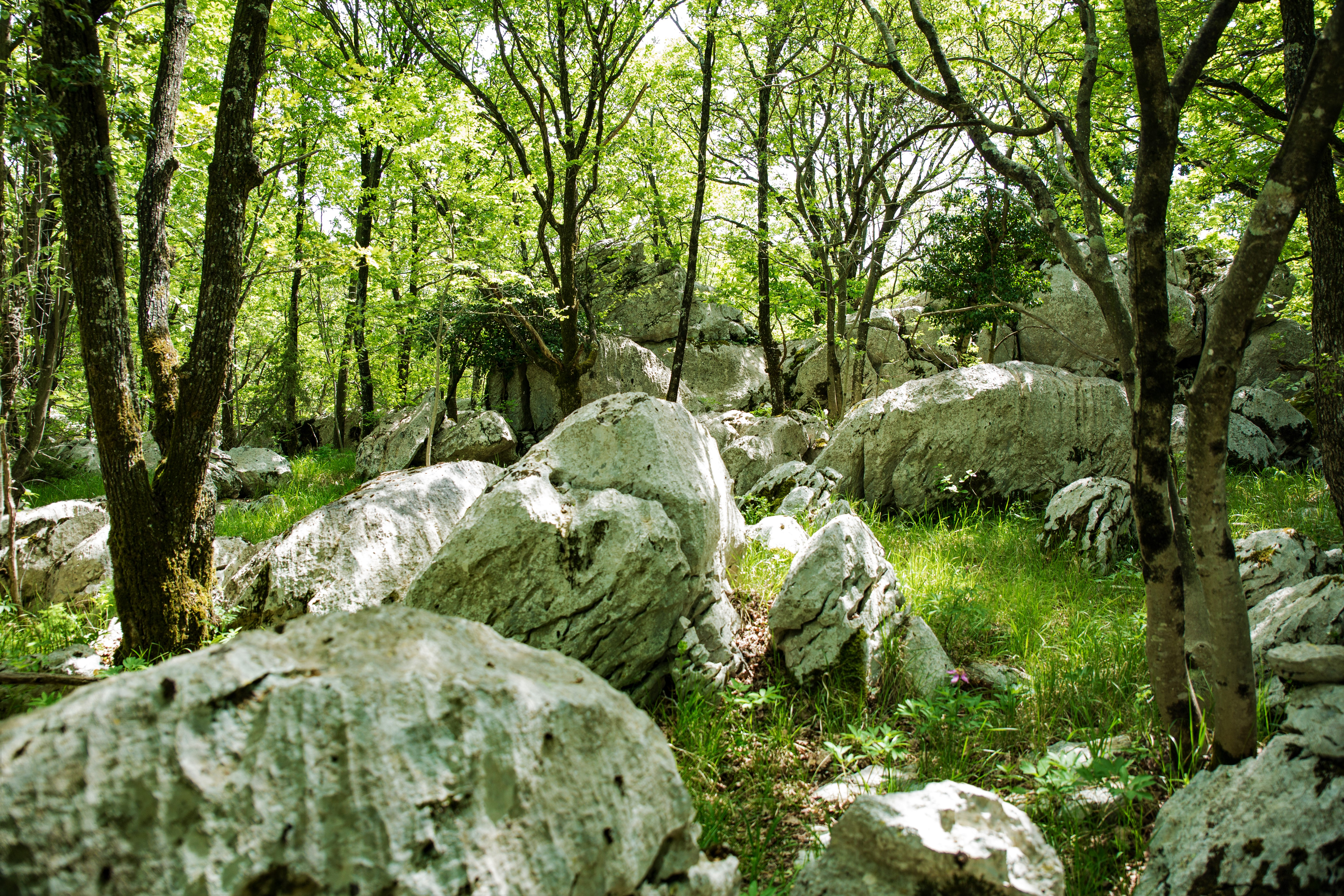
Karst Living Museum

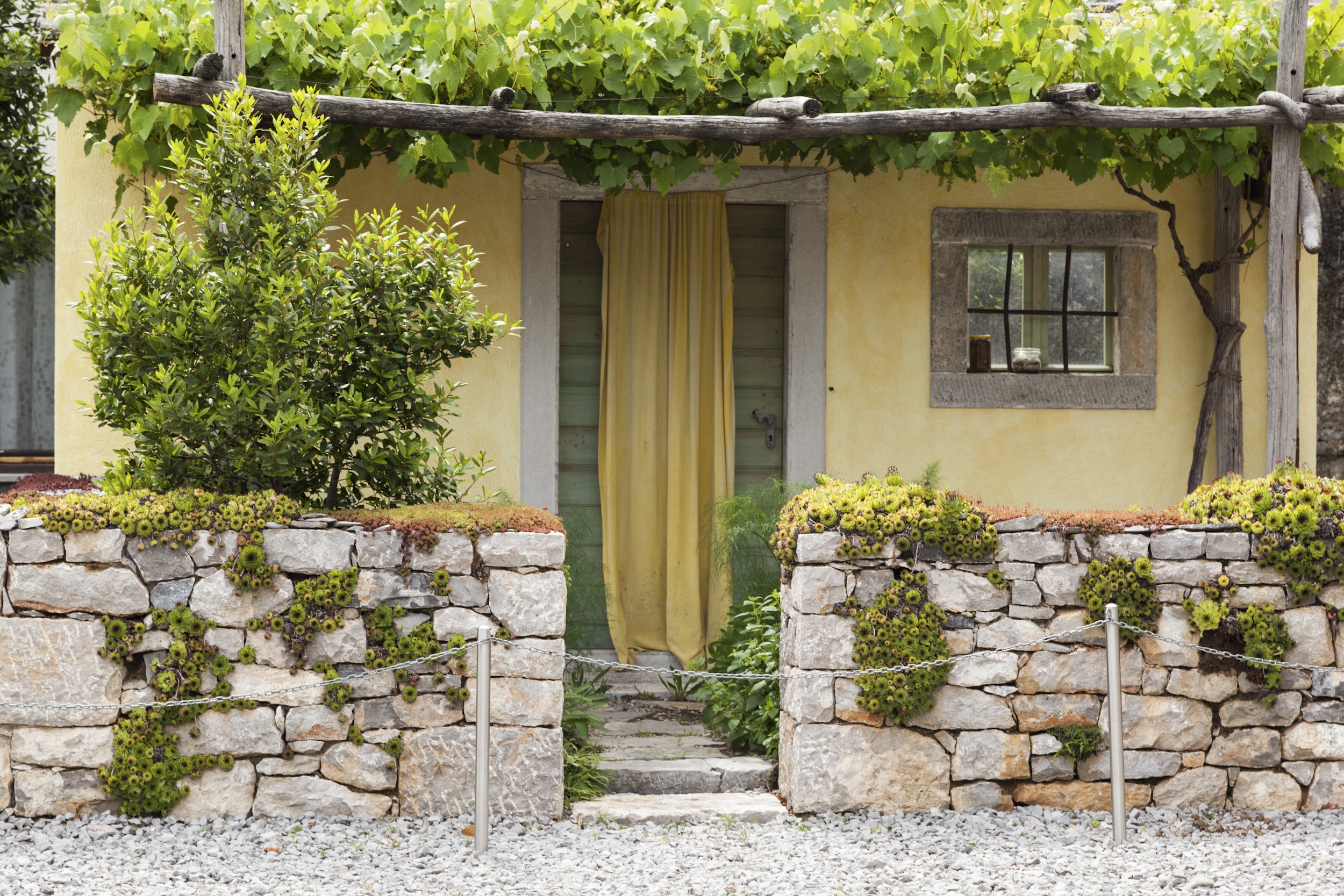
Pepa's Karst Garden

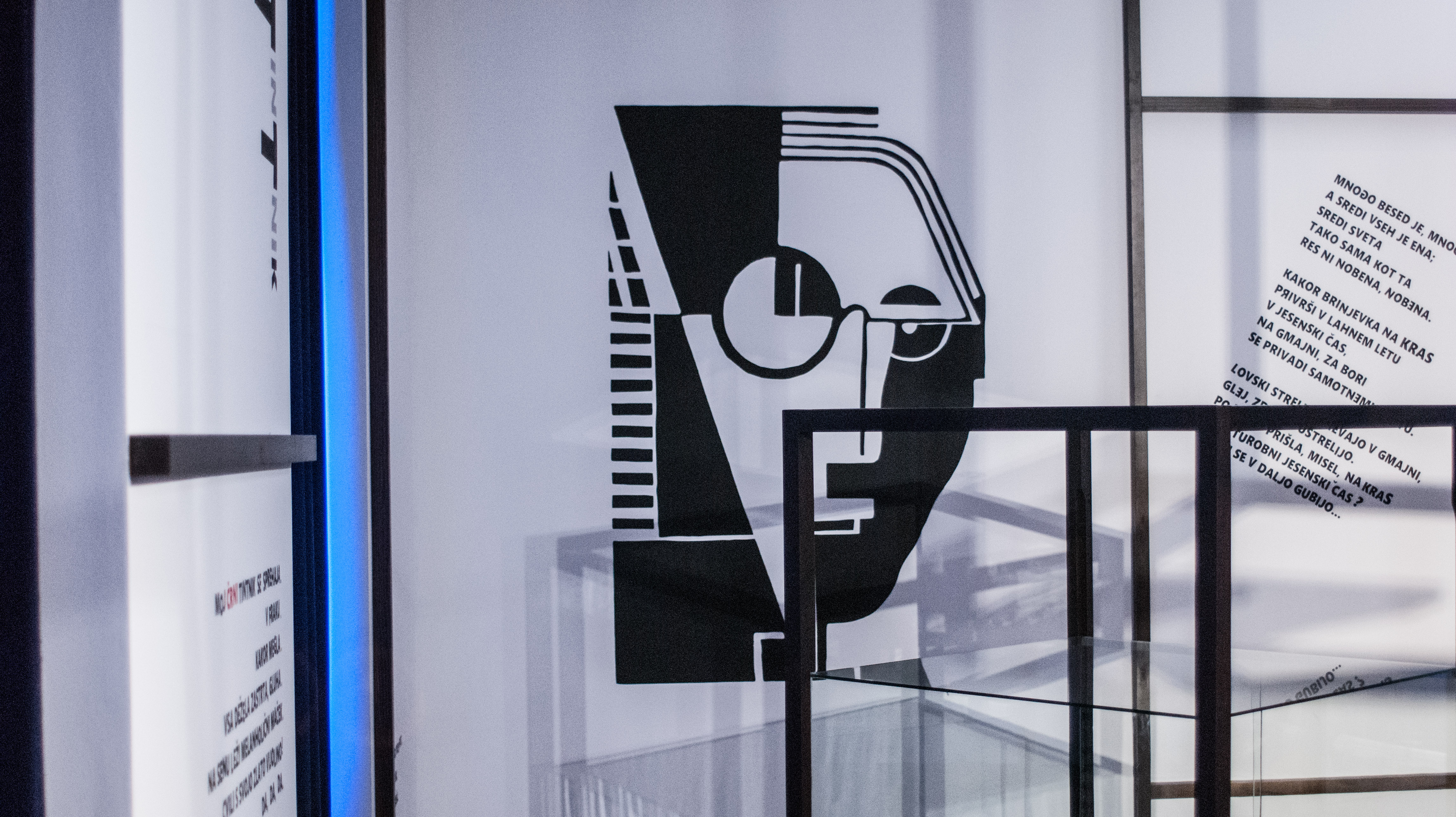
Kosovel Memorial Room

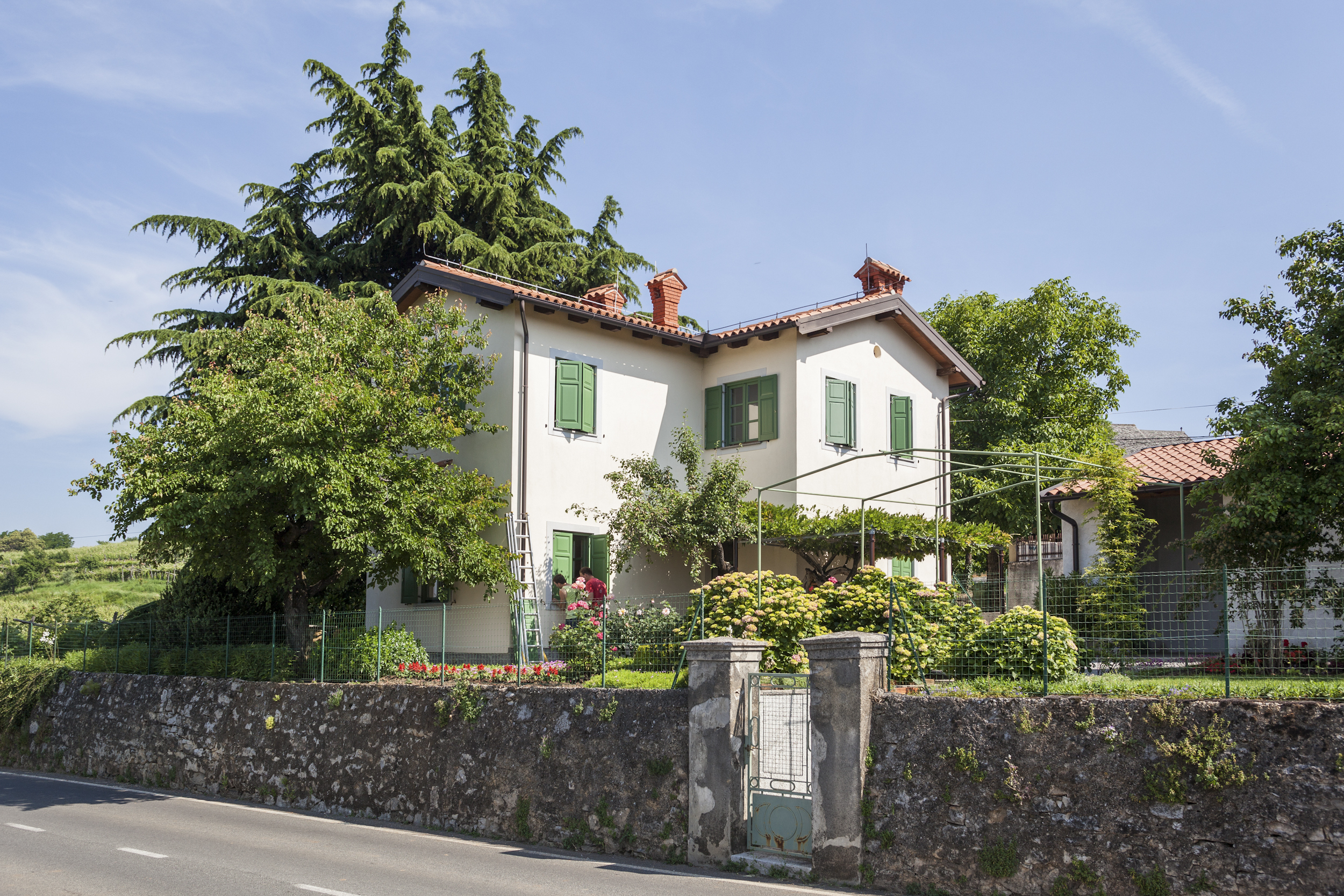
Kosovel Homestead

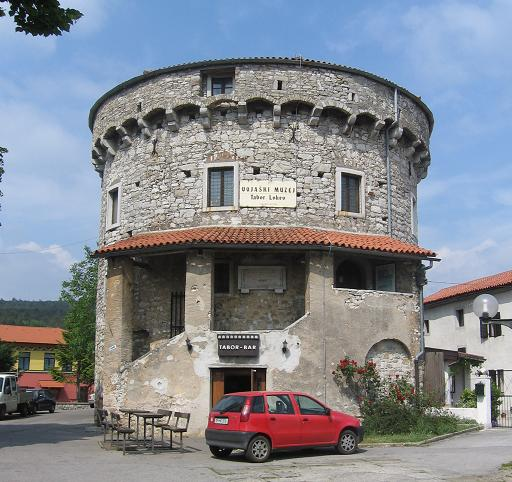
Military museum

== Notable people ==
Notable people that were born or lived in the Municipality of Sežana include:

- Primož Brezec, basketball player
- Avgust Černigoj, painter
- Danilo Dolci, Italian social activist
- Branka Jurca, author of children literature
- Taras Kermauner, literary historian and philosopher
- Srečko Kosovel, poet
- Josip Križaj, military pilot
- Simon Kukec, entrepreneur, founder of the modern Laško Brewery
- Josip Osti, poet, essayist, and translator
- Majda Širca, journalist and politician
- Ciril Zlobec, poet
