= Veliki Dol, Sežana =

Village in Littoral, Slovenia

Veliki Dol
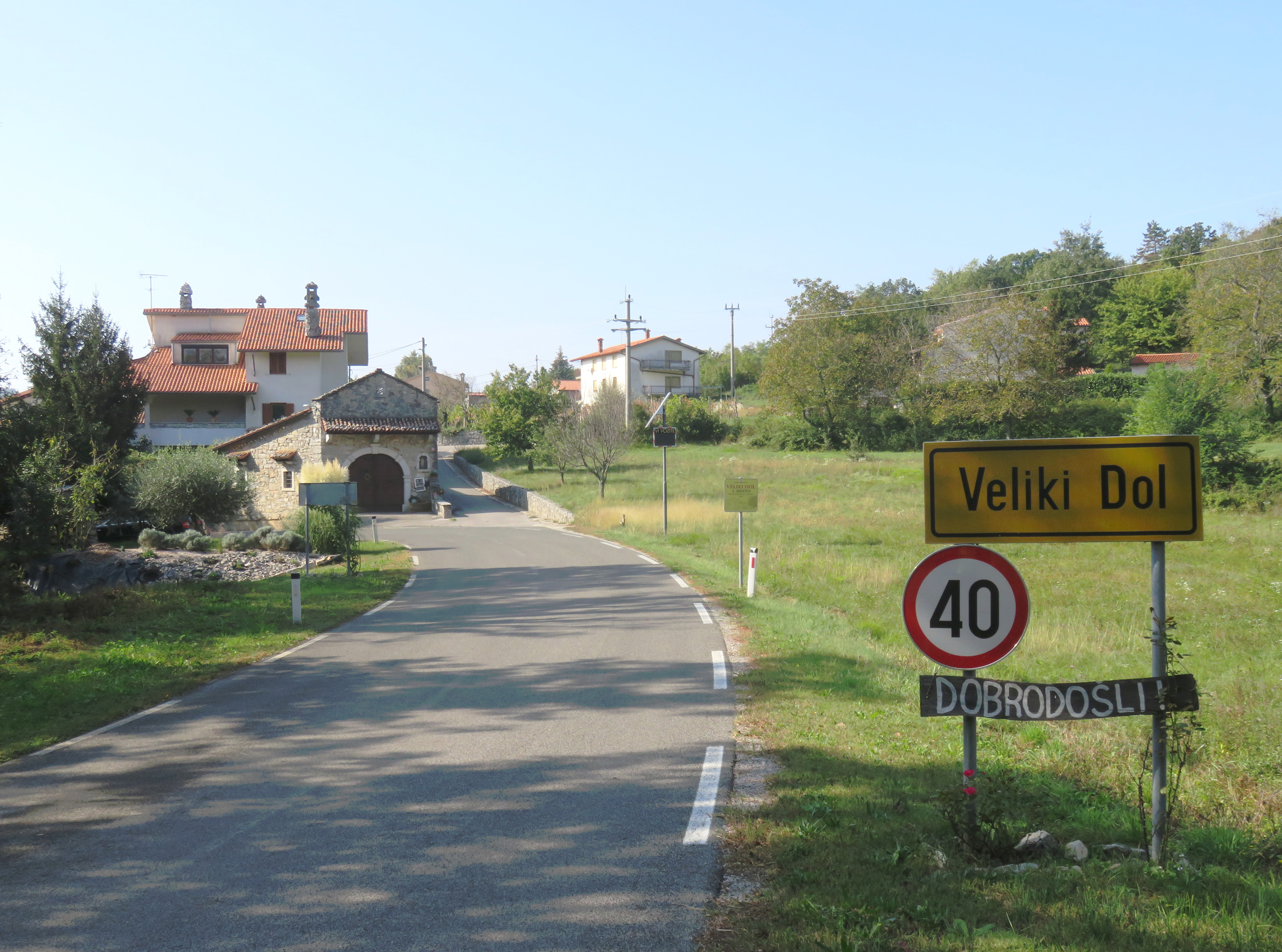

- Location in Slovenia
- Coordinates: 45°46′13.51″N 13°45′9.58″E
- Country: Slovenia
- Traditional region: Littoral
- Statistical region: Coastal–Karst
- Municipality: Sežana

Area
  - Total: 5.83 km^{2} (2.25 sq mi)
- Elevation: 215.3 m (706 ft)

Population (2002)
  - Total: 156

Veliki Dol (pronounced [ˈʋeːliki ˈdoːu̯]; Italian: Dol Grande) is a village in the Municipality of Sežana in the Littoral region of Slovenia next to the border with Italy.

== Church ==
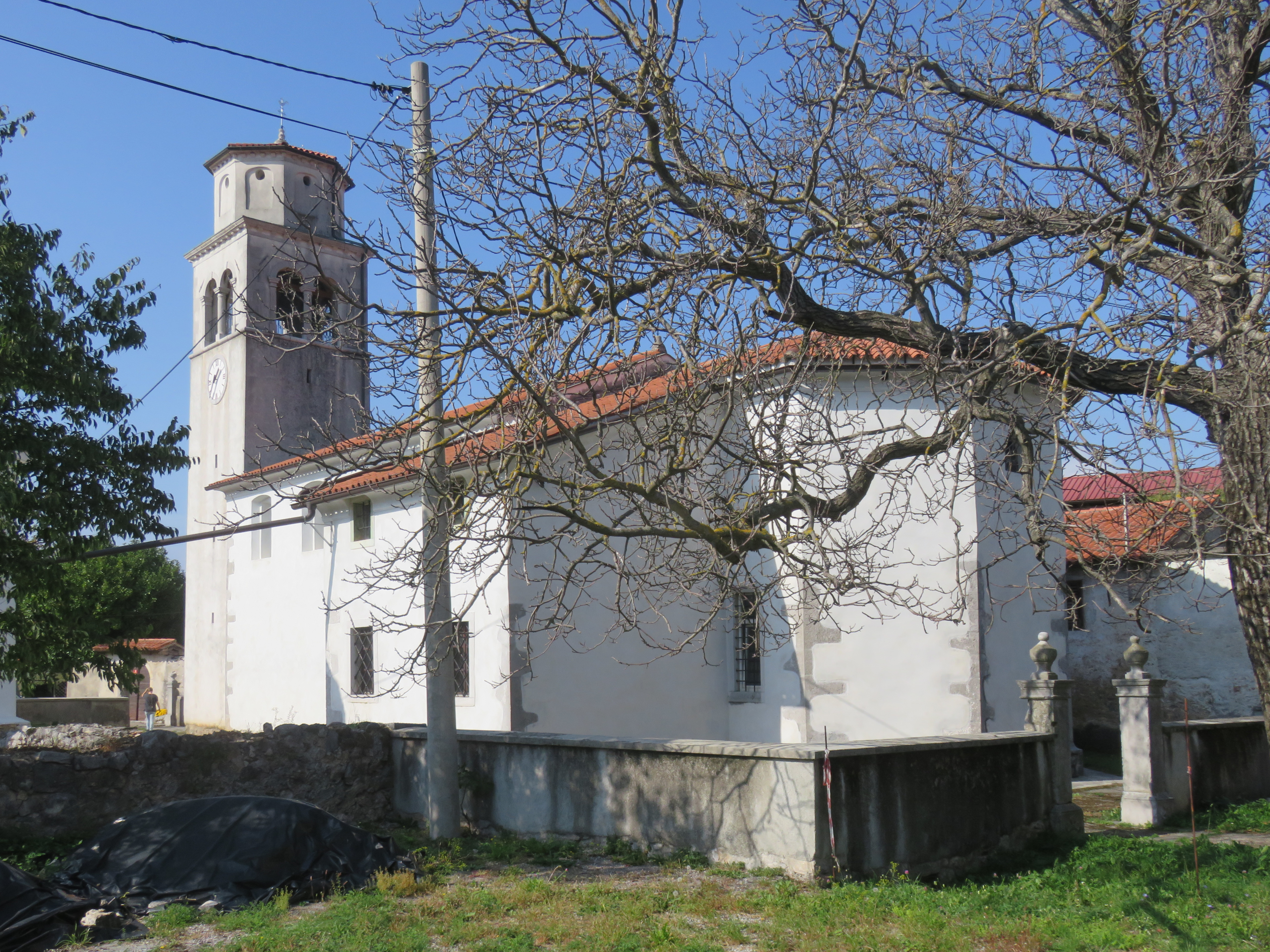
Saint James's Church

The parish church in the settlement is dedicated to Saint James and belongs to the Diocese of Koper.
