= Krtinovica =

- Location in Slovenia
- Coordinates: 45°48′21.22″N 13°52′35.55″E
- Country: Slovenia
- Traditional region: Littoral
- Statistical region: Coastal–Karst
- Municipality: Sežana

Area
  - Total: 1.04 km^{2} (0.40 sq mi)
- Elevation: 349 m (1,145 ft)

Population (2002)
  - Total: 8

Krtinovica (pronounced [kəɾˈtiːnɔʋitsa]) is a small village in the Municipality of Sežana in the Littoral region of Slovenia, close to the border with Italy.
