= Filipčje Brdo =

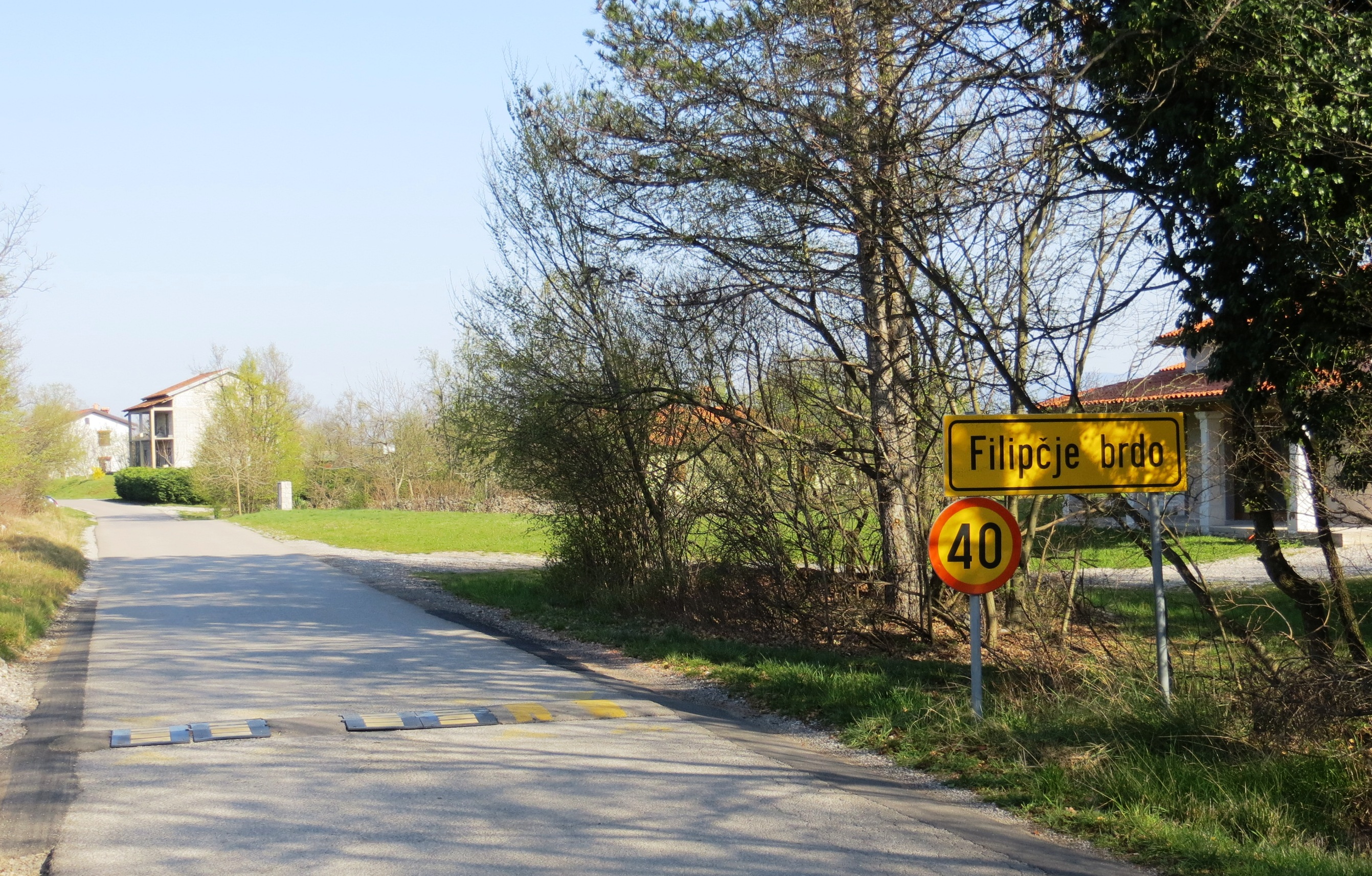

- Location in Slovenia
- Coordinates: 45°44′15.62″N 13°53′1.75″E
- Country: Slovenia
- Traditional region: Littoral
- Statistical region: Coastal–Karst
- Municipality: Sežana

Area
  - Total: 4.02 km^{2} (1.55 sq mi)
- Elevation: 339.1 m (1,113 ft)

Population (2002)
  - Total: 21

Filipčje Brdo (pronounced [fiˈliːptʃjɛ ˈbəɾdɔ]; Italian: Filippi) is a small settlement in the Municipality of Sežana in the Littoral region of Slovenia.
