= Selo, Sežana =

Selo
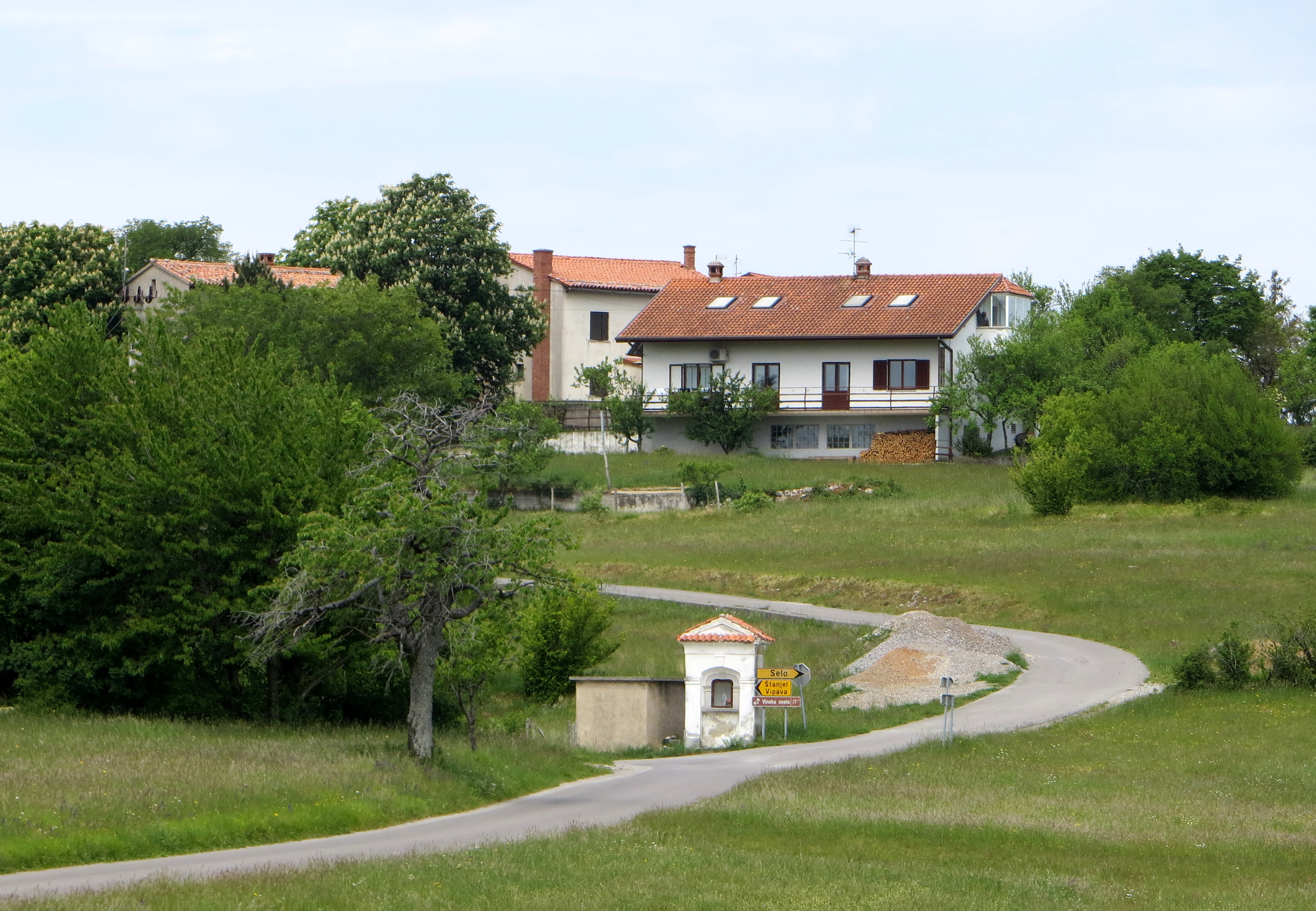

- Location in Slovenia
- Coordinates: 45°47′54.37″N 13°53′45.09″E
- Country: Slovenia
- Traditional region: Littoral
- Statistical region: Coastal–Karst
- Municipality: Sežana

Area
  - Total: 1.64 km^{2} (0.63 sq mi)
- Elevation: 528.2 m (1,733 ft)

Population (2002)
  - Total: 17

Selo (pronounced [ˈsɛːlɔ]) is a settlement in the Municipality of Sežana in the Littoral region of Slovenia.
