= Ravnje, Sežana =

Ravnje
- Location in Slovenia
- Coordinates: 45°47′52.69″N 13°53′6.22″E
- Country: Slovenia
- Traditional region: Littoral
- Statistical region: Coastal–Karst
- Municipality: Sežana

Area
  - Total: 0.86 km^{2} (0.33 sq mi)
- Elevation: 376.5 m (1,235 ft)

Population (2002)
  - Total: 54

Ravnje (pronounced [ˈɾaːu̯njɛ]) is a small settlement in the Municipality of Sežana in the Littoral region of Slovenia.

== Geography ==
The settlement has an area of 0.86 square kilometers (0.33 sq mi). It is located at an elevation of 376.5 meters (1,235 ft) above sea level.
