= Kazlje =

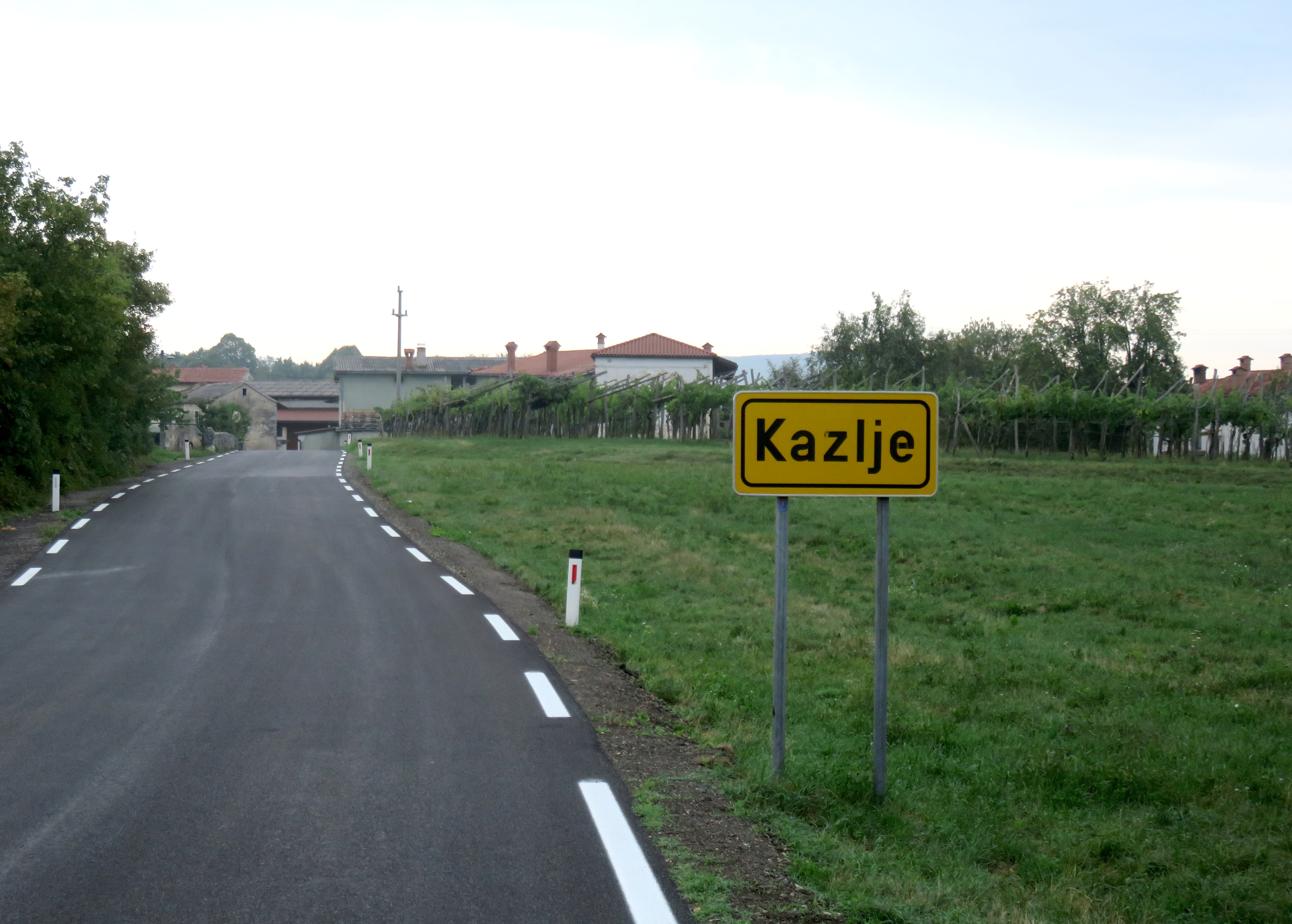

- Location in Slovenia
- Coordinates: 45°45′50.09″N 13°54′30.12″E
- Country: Slovenia
- Traditional region: Littoral
- Statistical region: Coastal–Karst
- Municipality: Sežana

Area
  - Total: 7.25 km^{2} (2.80 sq mi)
- Elevation: 338.5 m (1,111 ft)

Population (2002)
  - Total: 168

Kazlje (pronounced [ˈkaːzljɛ]) is a village in the Municipality of Sežana in the Littoral region of Slovenia.

== Church ==
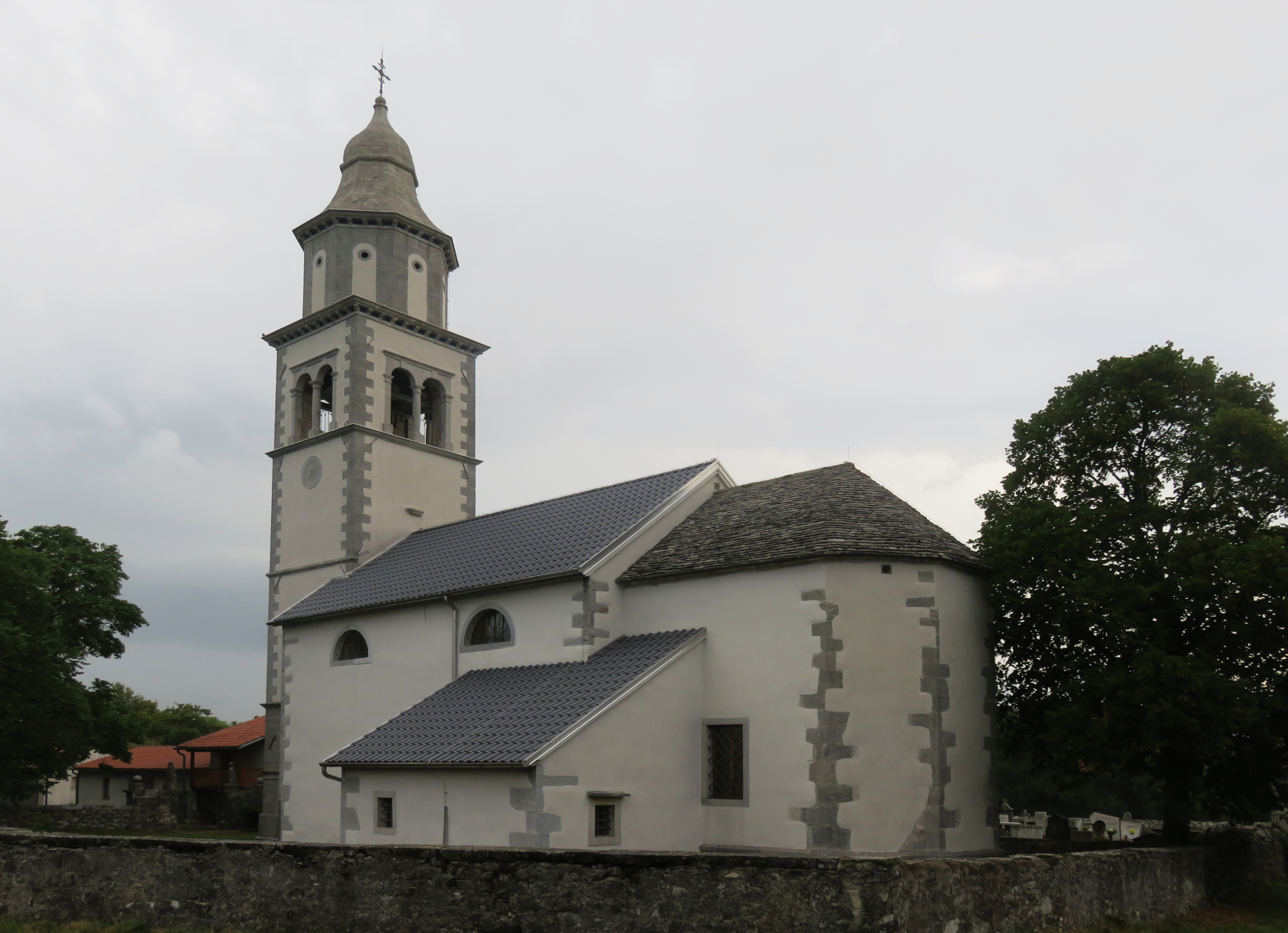
Saint Lawrence's Church

The local church, built just outside the settlement, is dedicated to Saint Lawrence and belongs to the Parish of Tomaj.
