= Pliskovica =

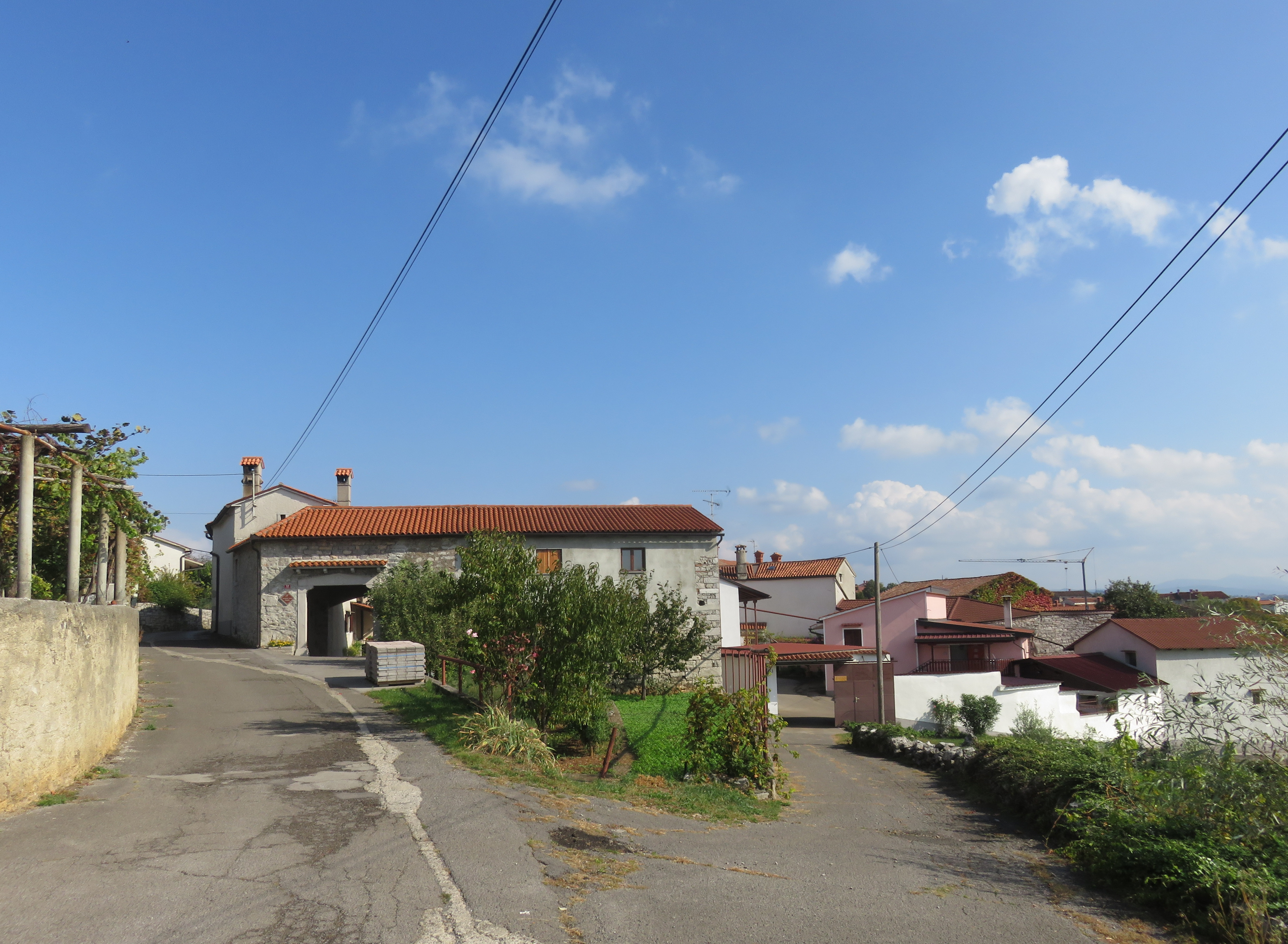

- Location in Slovenia
- Coordinates: 45°46′22.69″N 13°46′50.28″E
- Country: Slovenia
- Traditional region: Littoral
- Statistical region: Coastal–Karst
- Municipality: Sežana

Area
  - Total: 10.15 km^{2} (3.92 sq mi)
- Elevation: 278.3 m (913 ft)

Population (2002)
  - Total: 219

Pliskovica (pronounced [ˈpliːskɔʋitsa]) is a village in the Municipality of Sežana in the Littoral region of Slovenia close to the border with Italy.

== Church ==
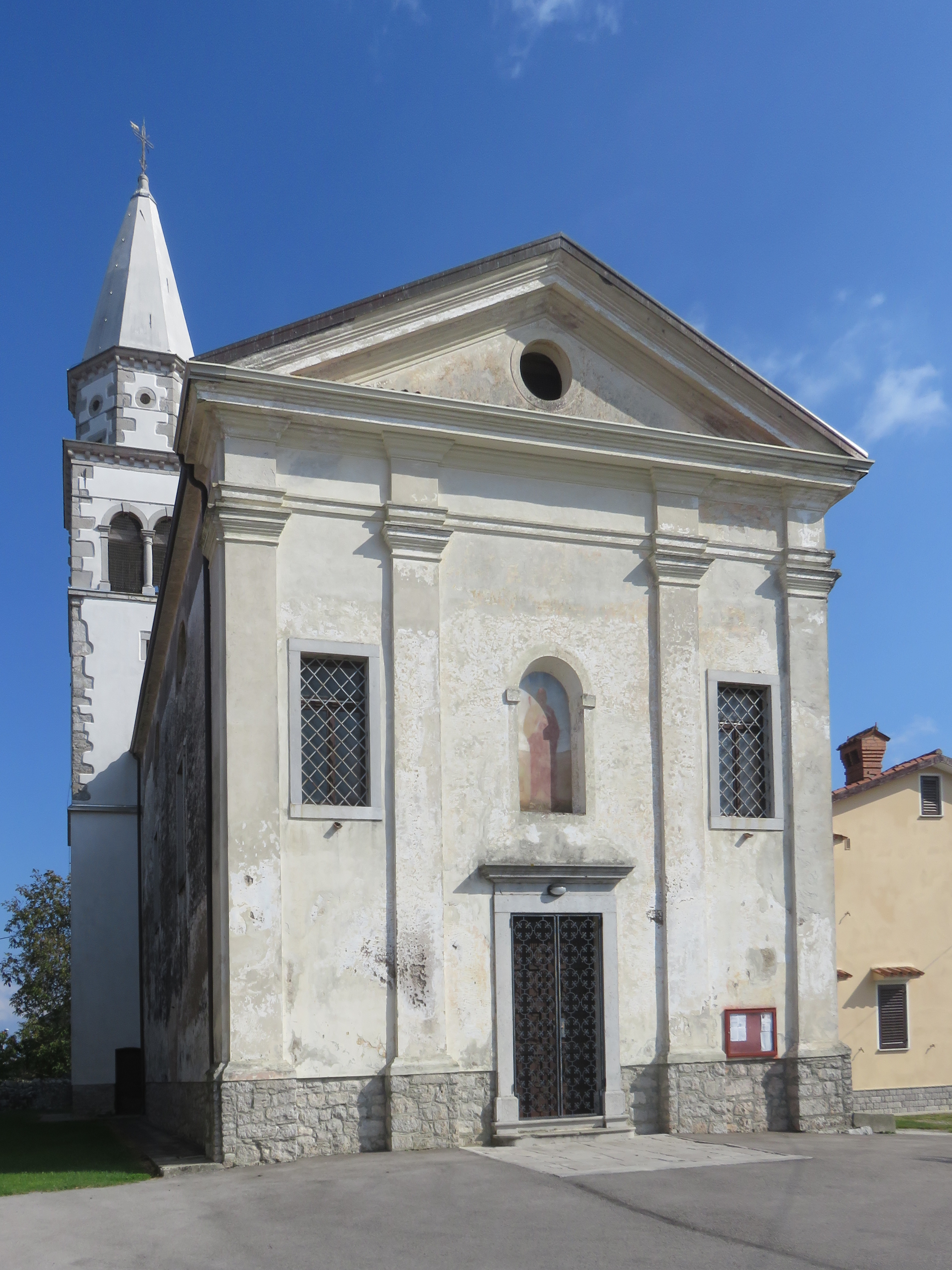
Saint Thomas's Church

The parish church in the settlement is dedicated to Saint Thomas and belongs to the Diocese of Koper.
