= Žirje, Sežana =

Žirje
- Location in Slovenia
- Coordinates: 45°42′31.26″N 13°55′11.43″E
- Country: Slovenia
- Traditional region: Littoral
- Statistical region: Coastal–Karst
- Municipality: Sežana

Area
  - Total: 2.05 km^{2} (0.79 sq mi)
- Elevation: 383.8 m (1,259 ft)

Population (2002)
  - Total: 94

Žirje (pronounced [ˈʒiːɾjɛ]; Italian: Sirie) is a small village northeast of Povir in the Municipality of Sežana in the Littoral region of Slovenia.
