= Steirischer Herbst =

Contemporary arts festival in Austria

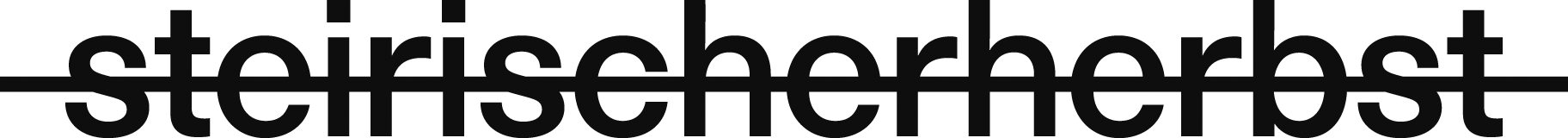
- Genre: arts festival
- Frequency: annually
- Locations: Graz, Styria
- Country: Austria
- Founded: 1968
- Website: www.steirischerherbst.at

Steirischer Herbst (styled as steirischer herbst) is an interdisciplinary festival for contemporary art. Since 1968, it has taken place annually in Graz and Styria, Austria, combining the visual arts, performance, theater, opera, music, and literature to varying degrees. The program mostly consists of commissioned works and premieres.

== Name ==
The name of the festival, which translates as "Styrian Autumn," probably comes from a poem by the Styrian dialect poet Hans Kloepfer. It alludes to the importance of agriculture in the region, which it contrasts with the harvest of intellectual fruits. Hanns Koren (Austrian People's Party, ÖVP), then State Cultural Advisor and the founder of Steirischer Herbst, was an admirer of Kloepfer, who was and is, however, controversial due to his support of Nazism.

== Artistic directors ==
Initially, Steirischer Herbst was headed by committees staffed with the most important protagonists of the Styrian cultural scene. From 1983 on, artistic directors were appointed:

- Peter Vujica (1983–1989)
- Horst Gerhard Haberl (1990–1995)
- Christine Frisinghelli (1996–1999)
- Peter Oswald (2000–2005)
- Veronica Kaup-Hasler (2006–2009; 2010–2014; 2015–2017)
- Ekaterina Degot (2018–2022; 2023–)

== History ==
=== 1968–1982 ===
Even before the actual founding, a series of events called "Steirischer Herbst" took place in 1967, which included many components of the later festival: the Styrian Academy, the Trigon Biennial, and the International Painting Weeks at Neue Galerie Graz. Other institutions participated in the first edition of 1968, such as the Vereinigte Bühnen Graz (Schauspielhaus Graz, Graz Opera), the ORF regional studio in Styria, the University of Music and Performing Arts Graz, and the artists' association Forum Stadtpark. In 1968, the first Musikprotokoll also took place. This platform for contemporary and experimental music, founded by Emil Breisach, remains part of the festival to this day. The disruption of a panel discussion on contemporary art brought Steirischer Herbst its first "scandal" in its founding year.

In its first years, the festival turned primarily to the (international) avant-garde, which had been banned or marginalized under the Nazis. The contradiction between its progressive program and conservative environment was characteristic of Steirischer Herbst. In addition to Koren, for example, the conversative politician Paul Kaufmann and Erich Marckhl, who had been a member of the illegal Austrian Nazi party, were also on the founding committee.

Early highlights included premieres of Ödön von Horváth, Peter Handke, and György Ligeti, as well as performances of operas by Krzysztof Penderecki and Ernst Krenek. In the field of visual arts, a solo exhibition of Bruno Munari, the Trigon Biennial Intermedia urbana and the exhibitions Körpersprache—Bodylanguage (with Vito Acconci, Trisha Brown, Valie Export, Bruce Nauman, Arnulf Rainer, and others) and Kunst als Lebensritual (with John Baldessari, Shigeko Kubota, Les Levine, Dennis Oppenheim, Friederike Pezold, and others) attracted attention. The festival posters also caused outrage, especially the one from 1972, which shows a stout man who—depending on one's interpretation—pulls up or lets down his pants.

In the course of the 1970s, the program was gradually expanded by a film festival, the Symposium on Photography, a children's and youth program, as well as cabaret and circus events (with the first appearance of Circus Roncalli). In addition, there were separate series for jazz (with concerts by Anthony Braxton and McCoy Tyner) and dance (including a commissioned work by Laura Dean) for the first time. Exhibitions during this period were curated primarily by Horst Gerhard Haberl and the Pool Group, as well as by Wilfried Skreiner, the director of Neue Galerie Graz. In 1979, Peter Pakesch and Peter Weibel curated the project Künstlerschaufenster (with Laurie Anderson, Artist Placement Group, Daniel Spoerri, and others); both were later regularly active at the Steirischer Herbst.

In the field of theater, mainly works by Austrian authors (e.g., Elfriede Jelinek, Ernst Jandl, and Gerhard Roth) were premiered. Wolfgang Bauer's Gespenster caused a sensation in 1975. The production, which was broadcast by ORF, was the subject of heated public debate and drew calls for the festival to be abolished. Hanns Koren was able to prevent this, not least through a speech in the state parliament. He was succeeded in 1976 by Kurt Jungwirth as president of Steirischer Herbst. In 1981, Hermann Nitsch and his Orgien-Mysterien-Theater also caused controversy; mayor Alexander Götz (Freedom Party of Austria, FPÖ) and cultural advisor Heinz Pammer (ÖVP), both members of the festival's board, disassociated themselves from Nitsch's performance.

=== 1983–1989 ===
Between 1983 and 1989, Steirischer Herbst was led by an artistic director for the first time: Peter Vujica, who had already headed Musikprotokoll in the early years. As festival director, Vujica focused on a mixture of classical and popular music. In addition to premieres by composers such as Luna Alcalay, Olga Neuwirth and Friedrich Cerha, he also invited industrial and post-punk bands such as Laibach, Fad Gadget, The Fall, and Der Plan or artists such as Glenn Branca to Graz. Apart from premieres of contemporary German-language theater (Heiner Müller, Herbert Achternbusch), the festival also saw several international premieres in the 1980s, for example by Julio Cortázar and Samuel Beckett, who wrote his last play and only commission (What Where) for Steirischer Herbst.

Vujica increasingly placed festival editions under a particular theme, such as Animal Art in 1987, which dealt with real, living animals in art (with works by Henning Christiansen, General Idea, Lili Fischer, Richard Kriesche, Christina Kubisch, Nam June Paik, and others). The edition was prompted by a 1985 animal rights protest against the use of the Lurgrotte for a concert by George Gruntz to protect the local bat population. (The concert was eventually recorded without an audience.)

The theme for 1988 was Schuld und Unschuld der Kunst (Guilt and Innocence of Art) and led to what is probably the most famous edition of Steirischer Herbst, which tackled Austria's Nazi past on the occasion of the 50th anniversary of the Anschluss. In particular, the project Bezugspunkte 38/88 (Points of Reference 38/88), curated by Werner Fenz and featuring art in public space, stirred up tempers. Several works were vandalized, such as a sound installation by Bill Fontana, whose cables were cut, and a sculpture by Hans Haacke, which was set on fire. The use of public space and the overarching festival theme have been features of Steirischer Herbst ever since.

=== 1990–1999 ===
Vujica was succeeded as festival director by Horst Gerhard Haberl in 1990. He placed his entire directorship (until 1995) under the motto of a "nomadology of the nineties." Haberl wanted to leave behind the notion of the avant-garde without resorting to that of postmodernism, and therefore proposed—in collaboration with philosopher Peter Strasser and inspired by Vilém Flusser as well as Deleuze and Guattari—"mobility" as a third option. To this end, Steirischer Herbst also launched two series of publications, herbstschrift and herbstbuch.

Hartmut Skerbisch's sculpture Lichtschwert (Light Sword), a copy of the Statue of Liberty's supporting structure with a sword instead of a torch, commissioned for the 1992 edition America Nowhere, made a lasting impression on Graz's cityscape; today, it stands next to the opera. In the same year, one of John Cage's last works was premiered at Musikprotokoll. Among the stage highlights of Haberl's directorship were performances by Werner Schwab and Botho Strauß (directed by Leander Haußmann), as well as performances by La Fura dels Baus and the premiere of Tomaž Pandur's Russische Mission.

In the visual arts, Peter Weibel curated the last Trigon Biennials on themes such as Identität : Differenz and Kontext Kunst. Already from the late 1980s onward, there had been a lively exchange between the Graz and Cologne art scenes at Steirischer Herbst (with Cosima von Bonin, Martin Kippenberger, Jutta Koether, Jörg Schlick, and others), which intensified in the course of the 1990s and also led to a collaboration with the Cologne-based music magazine Spex, whose editor-in-chief Christoph Gurk became a curator at the festival in 1998.

Prior to this, Christine Frisinghelli replaced Haberl as artistic director, who, in his words, was unable to prevail against the "party political pragmatisms of the decision-making regional politicians" with a planned restructuring of the festival. Frisinghelli, who had directed the Symposion on Photography since 1979, continued to steer the festival in the direction of discourse and pop culture and emphasized postcolonial topics. The 1996 exhibition Inklusion : Exklusion—Kunst im Zeitalter von Postkolonialismus und globaler Migration (Inclusion : Exclusion—Art in the Age of Postcolonialism and Global Migration), curated by Peter Weibel, was considered groundbreaking. In the 1990s, the festival overall became more global, but was also increasingly present in Styria with event series such as the Hör-Fest Steinach and the Mürz Werkstatt.

Steirischer Herbst experienced its—for now—last major art scandal in 1998 with Christoph Schlingensief's performance Künstler gegen Menschenrechte—Chance 2000 für Graz (Artists against Human Rights—Chance 2000 for Graz), for which the artist invited homeless people to sit on stakes, which the Freedom Party already protested against in advance.

=== 2000–2017 ===
In 2000, Peter Oswald, who like Vujica had already headed Musikprotokoll, took over as festival director. His directorship included Graz's year as European Capital of Culture and the opening of Helmut List Halle in 2003, which was to provide the "nomadic" festival with a permanent venue.

With numerous music theater premieres, such as a commission by Wolfgang Mitterer for his first edition, Oswald brought contemporary classical music back into focus. Beat Furrer's Begehren was chosen by Opernwelt as the premiere of the year 2002/03, while Rebecca Saunders contributed the music to a choreographic installation by Sasha Waltz. In addition, playwright Händl Klaus celebrated his breakthrough with (wilde)—der mann mit den traurigen augen in 2003, which was invited both to the Mülheimer Theatertage and the Berliner Theatertreffen. In the field of visual arts, Stella Rollig, Peter Pakesch, and Zaha Hadid and Patrik Schumacher curated exhibitions. A show on Rudi Gernreich was taken over by the Institute of Contemporary Art, Philadelphia.

In 2005, the festival, which since the 1970s had been run by a civil law partnership, a limited liability company, and an association, was legally restructured and has since been owned as a limited liability company two-thirds by the province of Styria and one-third by the City of Graz.

The following year, Veronica Kaup-Hasler replaced Oswald and remained artistic director until 2017—the longest term of office to date. Kaup-Hasler placed an emphasis on performance and experimental theater productions with many international coproductions. Thus, performances by Nature Theater of Oklahoma, Lola Arias, Tim Etchells and Forced Entertainment, Anne Teresa De Keersmaeker, Young Jean Lee, Needcompany, Rimini Protokoll, Signa, Gisèle Vienne, and Apichatpong Weerasethakul could be seen in Graz. Between 2007 and 2017, Steirischer Herbst was also a member of the EU-funded festival network NXTSTP.

Guest curators were regularly engaged for exhibitions, such as Sabine Breitwieser for the two-year project Utopie und Monument (with Kader Attia, Nairy Baghramian, Ayşe Erkmen, Isa Genzken, John Knight, Andreas Siekmann, and others).

A trademark of Kaup-Hasler's directorship were the temporary festival centers designed by a different architectural firm each year (in 2011, as a festival district in Mariahilferstraße). In 2012—the theme was Truth Is Concrete—one of the more unusual projects in the festival's history took place here: a "24/7 marathon camp" in which 200 participants discussed politics and art nonstop. Apart from this, there were also numerous other discourse events during Kaup-Hasler's time.

In 2017, Steirischer Herbst took place for the 50th time. To mark the occasion, the performance collective Nature Theater of Oklahoma created a feature film adaptation of Elfriede Jelinek's novel The Children of the Dead. The film won the FIPRESCI award at the Berlinale, among others, and screened at dozens of festivals. In addition, an online database on the festival's history was created, and an anniversary exhibition was shown at Graz Museum. In the first 50 years of the festival, well over three million people visited the festival.

=== 2018– ===
In 2018, Ekaterina Degot became the festival's new director. Even more so than her predecessor, she united individual parts of the program and conceived steirischer herbst as a "parcours" with exhibitions, installations, and performances distributed throughout the city. The visual arts again occupied a more central place than with Oswald and Kaup-Hasler.

In 2020, Degot became the first festival director to be included in ArtReview's Power 100 list and was also selected by German art magazine Monopol as one of the 100 most influential people in the art world. In the face of the COVID-19 pandemic, the festival used different approaches to still take place. In 2020, a streaming service featuring video art called Paranoia TV was launched, and in 2021, most events took place outdoors. The 2022 and 2023 editions were dominated by the Russian invasion of Ukraine and other crises. The edition of 2024 is concepted around a latin word game Horror Patriae between amor patriae, love to the fatherland, and horror vacui, the fear of emptiness. In light of the 2024 Styrian elections, in which right wing party FPÖ became the head of government, and lead to cultural cuts across the board, especially in the independent artist scene, the Steirischer Herbst adopted the motto "Red Flags."

Since 2018, commissions by Alice Creischer, Josef Dabernig, Lawrence Abu Hamdan, Boris Charmatz, Thomas Hirschhorn, Thomas Hörl, Jakob Lena Knebl, Oscar Murillo, Joanna Rajkowska, Roee Rosen, Tino Sehgal, Hito Steyerl, Meg Stuart, and many others, have been shown at Steirischer Herbst.

== Participating institutions ==
The most important Styrian cultural institutions were involved in the founding of the festival. From 1975 onward, Steirischer Herbst produced its own events, which gradually became the focus of the program.

== Venues ==
Steirischer Herbst only had its own venue from 2003 to 2005, Helmut List Halle, which it continues to use but no longer operates. For the rest, the festival was and is dependent on renting venues in Graz and Styria, or finding and adapting them. Art projects have already been realized in abandoned manufacturing shops, swimming pools, and other vacant spaces, often also in public space.

In addition, the festival has regularly opened "herbst bars" at various locations in Graz since the mid-1990s. Under the directorship of Veronica Kaup-Hasler, temporary festival centers were also used as venues; these have been transformed into visitor and press centers since 2018.
