= Bergen Assembly 2013 =

- Genre: Contemporary art
- Begins: 31 August 2013
- Ends: 27 October 2013
- Frequency: Triennial
- Location: Bergen
- Country: Norway
- Next event: Bergen Assembly 2016
- Organizer: Ekaterina Degot; David Riff
- Website: Official website

Bergen Assembly 2013, titled Monday Begins on Saturday, was the first edition of Bergen Assembly, held in Bergen, Norway, from 31 August to 27 October 2013. It was convened by Ekaterina Degot and David Riff. The title was taken from the 1965 novel Monday Begins on Saturday by Arkady and Boris Strugatsky, whose fictional research institute served as a conceptual point of reference for the exhibition’s structure.

The programme combined an international exhibition, publication, and symposium presented across multiple venues in the city. Conceived as an archipelago of fictional “research institutes”, it brought together newly commissioned works and historical material to explore artistic research, speculative inquiry, and hybrid curatorial formats.

Critical reception noted the edition’s attempt to rethink the structure of large-scale recurring exhibitions by foregrounding research processes and discursive formats rather than a single centralized exhibition model. Other commentary described the project as a critical meditation on artistic research that blurred boundaries between exhibition-making, scholarship, and curatorial practice.

== Participants ==
Bergen Assembly 2013 – Venues and Participants
Venue	Project / Institute	Artists and Contributors
KODE 4	Institute of the Anti-Formalism	Aeron Bergman and Alejandra Salinas; Władysław Strzemiński; Ada Rybachuk and Volodymyr Melnychenko; Carlfriedrich Claus; Dmitry Gutov; Ane Hjort Guttu
Bergen Kjøtt	Institute of Defensive Magic	Pedro Gómez-Egaña; Roee Rosen; Stephan Dillemuth and Clemens von Wedemeyer
Bergen Kunsthall	Institute of the Disappearing Future	Kiluanji Kia Henda; Ilya Kabakov and Emilia Kabakov; Anton Vidokle and Pelin Tan; Ritwik Ghatak; Uriel Orlow; Ivan Melnychuk and Oleksandr Burlaka (Grupa Predmetiv); Minze Tummescheit and Arne Hector (cinéma copains); Mariusz Tarkawian
KODE 1 (West Norway Museum of Decorative Art)	Institute of Imaginary States	Lars Cuzner and Fadlabi; IRWIN / NSK State; Jumana Manna and Sille Storihle; Eduardo Molinari; Pavel Pepperstein; Pyotr Subbotin-Permyak; Urban Fauna Laboratory
KNIPSU	Institute of Love and the Lack Thereof	Chto Delat; Keti Chukhrov
The School Museum	Institute of Lyrical Sociology	Olga Chernysheva; Josef Dabernig; Dora García
Kunsthall 3.14	Institute of Perpetual Accumulation	Alice Creischer and Andreas Siekmann; Yuri Leiderman and Andrey Silvestrov
Østre Skostredet	Institute of Pines and Prison Bread	Aleksandr Rodchenko; Wong Men Hoi; Imogen Stidworthy
Rom8	Institute of Tropical Fascism	Inti Guerrero
Visningsrommet USF	Institute of Zoopolitics	Jan Peter Hammer
Entrée	Institute of Political Hallucinations	Christian von Borries
