= Milan Bizovičar =

Slovenian painter and illustrator (1927–2006)

- Born: 13 January 1927; Ljubljana, Yugoslavia
- Died: 2006 (aged 78–79)
- Education: Academy of Fine Arts, Ljubljana
- Known for: painting, illustrating
- Notable work: Painting and illustration
- Awards: Levstik Award; 1958 for Maghellanovo potovanje okoli sveta Levstik Award; 1962 for Zgodbe iz mesta Rič-Rač; Levstik Award; 1967 for Solzice and Salomonovi rudniki Levstik Award; 1974 for Možiček med dimniki Levstik Award; 1975 for Abecedarija

Milan Bizovičar (13 January 1927 – 2006) was a Slovene painter and illustrator.

Bizovičar was born in Ljubljana in 1927. He studied at the Academy of Fine Arts in Ljubljana from where he graduated in 1949. He also illustrated numerous children's books and won the Levstik Award for his illustrations five times, in 1958, 1962, 1967, 1974 and 1975.

== Selected Illustrated Works ==
- Televizijski otroci (Television Children), written by Neža Maurer, 1986
- Ko smo se ženili (When We Were Getting Married), written by Ivan Potrč, 1983
- Bobri (Beavers), written by Janez Jalen, 1982
- Luka (Luka), written by Beno Zupančič, 1981
- Abadon, written by Janez Mencinger, 1980
- Žrebiček brez potnega lista (The Foal Without A Passport), written by Branka Jurca, 1980
- Prgišče zvezd (A Fistful of Stars), written by Branka Jurca, 1980
- Najdihojca (Najdihojca), written by Fran Levstik, 1979
- Najmočnejši fantek na svetu (The Strongest Boy in the World), written by Lojze Kovačič, 1977
- Stolp iz voščilnic (The Greeting Card Tower), written by Ela Peroci, 1977
- Majhne besede, velike reči (Small Words, Large Things), written by Smiljan Rozman, 1976
- Dobri sovražnikov pes (The Good Enemy Dog), written by Kristina Brenk, 1975
- Abecedarija (Alphabetary), written by Dane Zajc, 1975
- Miška spi (The Little Mouse Sleeps), written by Svetlana Makarovič, 1975
- Ježek se ženi (The Hedgehog's Wedding), written by Jože Šmit, 1974
- Možiček med dimniki (A Man Amidst the Chimneys), written by Lojze Kovačič, 1974
- Zgodbe iz mesta Rič-Rač (Tales from Rič-Rač Town), written by Lojze Kovačič, 1969
- Prvi maj (First of May), written by Prežihov Voranc, 1961
