= Potrč =

Potrč is a Slovene surname. Notable people with the surname include:

- Ivan Potrč (1913–1993), Slovene writer and playwright
- Marjetica Potrč (born 1953), Slovene artist and architect
