= Brje pri Koprivi =

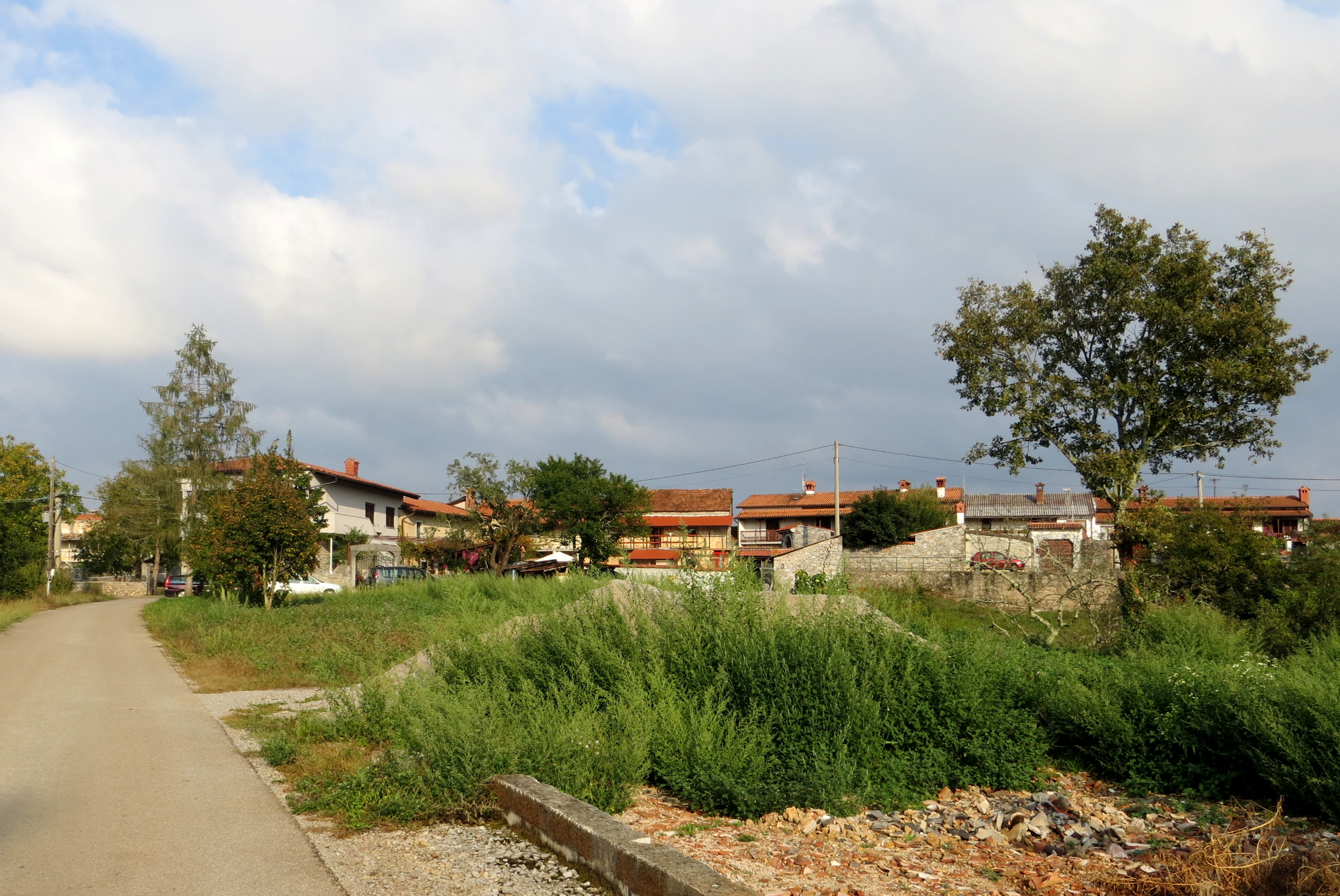

- Location in Slovenia
- Coordinates: 45°46′36.32″N 13°50′30.81″E
- Country: Slovenia
- Traditional region: Littoral
- Statistical region: Coastal–Karst
- Municipality: Sežana

Area
  - Total: 1.62 km^{2} (0.63 sq mi)
- Elevation: 281 m (922 ft)

Population (2002)
  - Total: 23

Brje pri Koprivi (pronounced [ˈbəɾjɛ pɾi kɔˈpɾiːʋi]) is a small settlement southeast of Kopriva in the Municipality of Sežana in the Littoral region of Slovenia.

== Name ==
The name Brje pri Koprivi literally means 'Brje near Kopriva'. The name Brje is derived from *Brjane 'hill dwellers', ultimately from Common Slavic *bьrdo 'hill'. Like other settlements with the same name (e.g., Brje, Brje pri Komnu), it is thus a geographical designation for the original inhabitants.

== History ==
It was settled by the Uskoks, as evidenced by the surnames Jurca, Novič, and Gulič as well as the former church (demolished in 1802) dedicated to the Prophet Elijah.
