= Kælan Mikla =

Icelandic post-punk trio

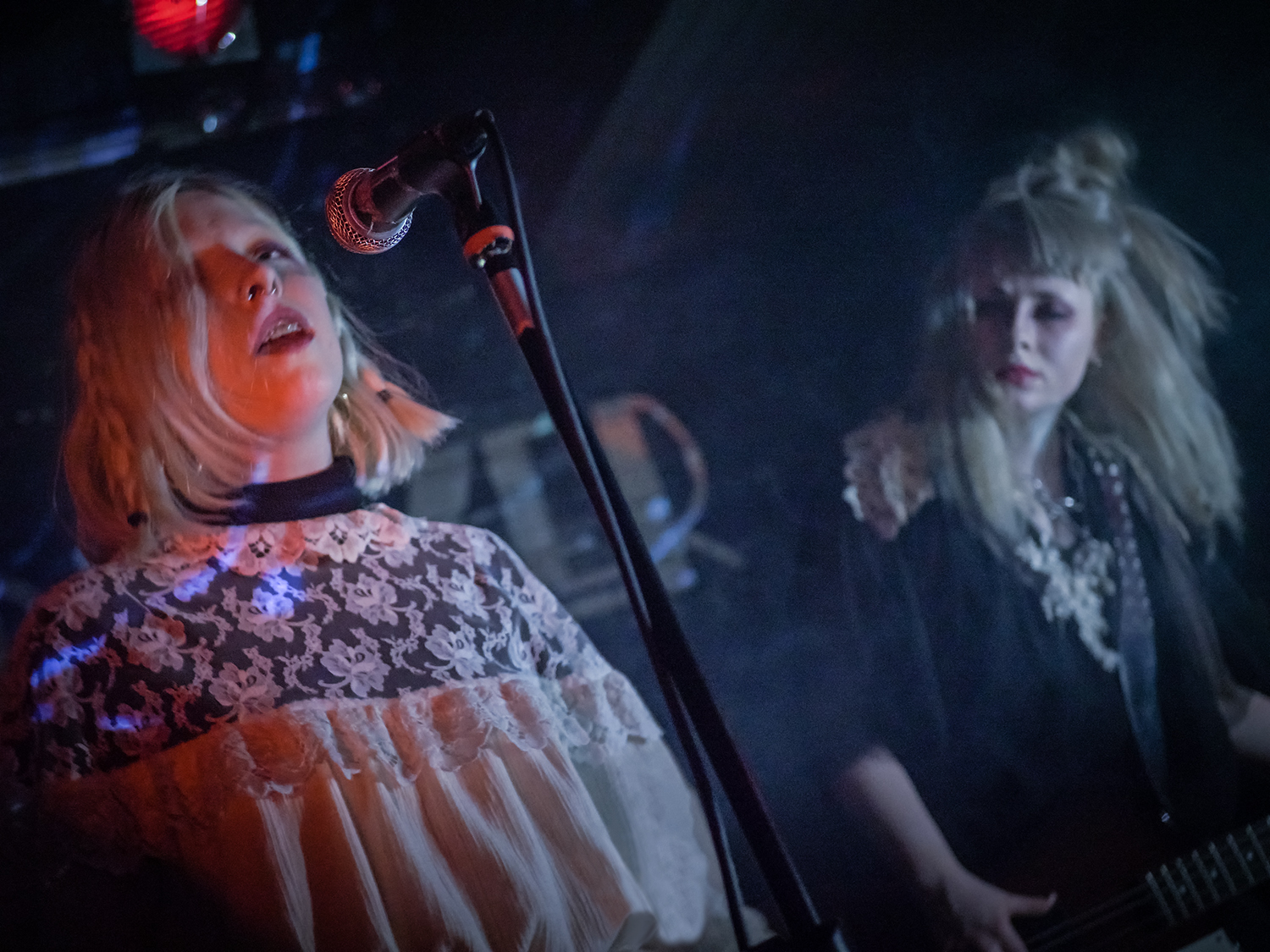
- Kælan Mikla performing in Madrid in 2019

Background information
- Origin: Reykjavík, Iceland
- Genres: Post-punk; dark wave; cold wave; gothic rock
- Years active: 2013–present
- Labels: Artoffact, Fabrika
- Members: Laufey Soffía; Margrét Rósa Dóru-Harrýsdóttir; Sólveig Matthildur Kristjánsdóttir
- Website: www.kaelanmikla.com

Kælan Mikla (lit. 'the Great Cold'; Icelandic pronunciation: [ˈcʰaiːlan ˈmɪhkla]) is an Icelandic post-punk band formed in 2013 in Reykjavík. The trio consists of lead vocalist Laufey Soffía, bassist Margrét Rósa Dóru-Harrýsdóttir and keyboardist Sólveig Matthildur Kristjánsdóttir. Their music has been described as post-punk, dark wave, cold wave and gothic.

The band's debut album Mánadans was recorded in 2014 and featured Matthildur on drums instead of synthesizer. They released a self-titled follow-up in 2016 by Fabrika Records, Nótt eftir nótt in 2018 and Undir köldum norðurljósum in 2021. They are currently signed to Artoffact Records.

The band has played the famous Dutch music festival Roadburn, been championed by Robert Smith of the Cure and opened for Placebo, Alcest, and Ville Valo of HIM.

== History ==
The members met while attending Menntaskólinn við Hamrahlíð, an upper secondary school known for attracting artistically oriented students. They formed Kælan Mikla in 2013 as an entry for a local poetry contest hosted by the Reykjavík City Library, combining Matthildur's written poems with Rósa's bass and Soffía's vocals. Matthildur was a trained flutist who learned drums for the performance, while Soffía had never sung in public before. The group won first place at the poetry slam and, encouraged by the reception, decided to continue making music.

The band took its name from Kælan Mikla, the Icelandic name of the Lady of the Cold, a supernatural winter figure in Tove Jansson's Moomin stories. The Icelandic phrase literally means "the Great Cold". Laufey Soffía said that she and Sólveig Matthildur chose the name because they thought, "It would be funny to name a band after a Moomin!"

The band's debut album Mánadans was recorded in 2014 and was produced by Alison MacNeil of the band Kimono. It saw release via limited edition cassette in 2017 and was re-released in 2018 on Artoffact with a bonus track. In 2015, Matthildur switched from playing drums to the synthesizer. That December, the band signed to Fabrika Records and released their self-titled second album on 30 June 2016.

After years of booking their own tours, Kælan Mikla was added to agency Swamp Booking's roster by recommendation of Drab Majesty, who the band opened for in 2017 and 2018. Robert Smith asked Kælan Mikla to perform at the 2018 Meltdown festival in London, whose lineup Smith personally curated for the Cure's 40th anniversary. The group opened for Placebo at the Southbank Centre. The band also performed at Roadburn Festival for the first time in 2018.

The band's third album Nótt eftir nótt ("Night After Night") was released on 9 November 2018 and "contains songs of regrets, shadows, witches and all the things that lure in the darkest hour of night, mixed with Icelandic folklore and reminiscence of the winter darkness that simultaneously frightens us and makes us feel at home," Matthildur said. Its lead single was "Nornalagið", released in October, and the band performed a release show at the Iceland Airwaves festival. The second single "Næturblóm" was praised by Revolver and Louder Audio. It was released on Artoffact as the band began business with the label because of their debut's re-release.

In 2019, the band was again selected by Robert Smith to play his Pasadena Daydream festival in California alongside bands such as Pixies, Deftones and Mogwai.

On 6 April 2021, the band released "Sólstöður", the lead single to their fourth album Undir köldum norðurljósum ("Under the Cold Northern Lights"). The song is "an ode to the darkest night of the year, when witches summon winter spirits in the frozen vastness of Icelandic landscapes." Second single "Ósýnileg" was premiered by Adult Swim on 2 June. The album was released on 15 October 2021 and features Alcest, who the band opened for in 2020, on the song "Hvítir sandar".

In 2023 the band performed together with Bardi Johannsson at the Transylvania International Film Festival for the Swedish 1921 silent movie "The Phantom Carriage". The original score was released in April 2024, physically and digitally. The band previously contributed their song "Kalt" for the silent movie "F.W.M. Symphony" directed by visual artist Thomas Hörl in 2022.

== Musical style and lyrics ==
Kælan Mikla's music is often described as post-punk, dark wave, cold wave and gothic. Revolver described their sound as containing "sweeping eerie soundscapes, irresistible post-punk hooks and dance beats couple with angelic voices and blood-curdling shrieks." The band's sound draws from the darkness and cold of its native Iceland. Icelandic nature, history, folklore and mythology play a role in Kælan Mikla's music. Its members all identify as feminists, which inspires their heavy use of witchcraft imagery.

== Band members ==
Current members

- Laufey Soffía - lead vocals
- Margrét Rósa - bass, backing vocals
- Sólveig Matthildur - keyboards, backing vocals, flute, drums

== Discography ==
- Mánadans (2014)
- Kælan Mikla (2016) Fabrikas Records
- Nótt eftir nótt (2018)
- Undir köldum norðurljósum (2021)
- The Phantom Carriage (2024)
