= Skulptur Projekte Münster =

German exhibition

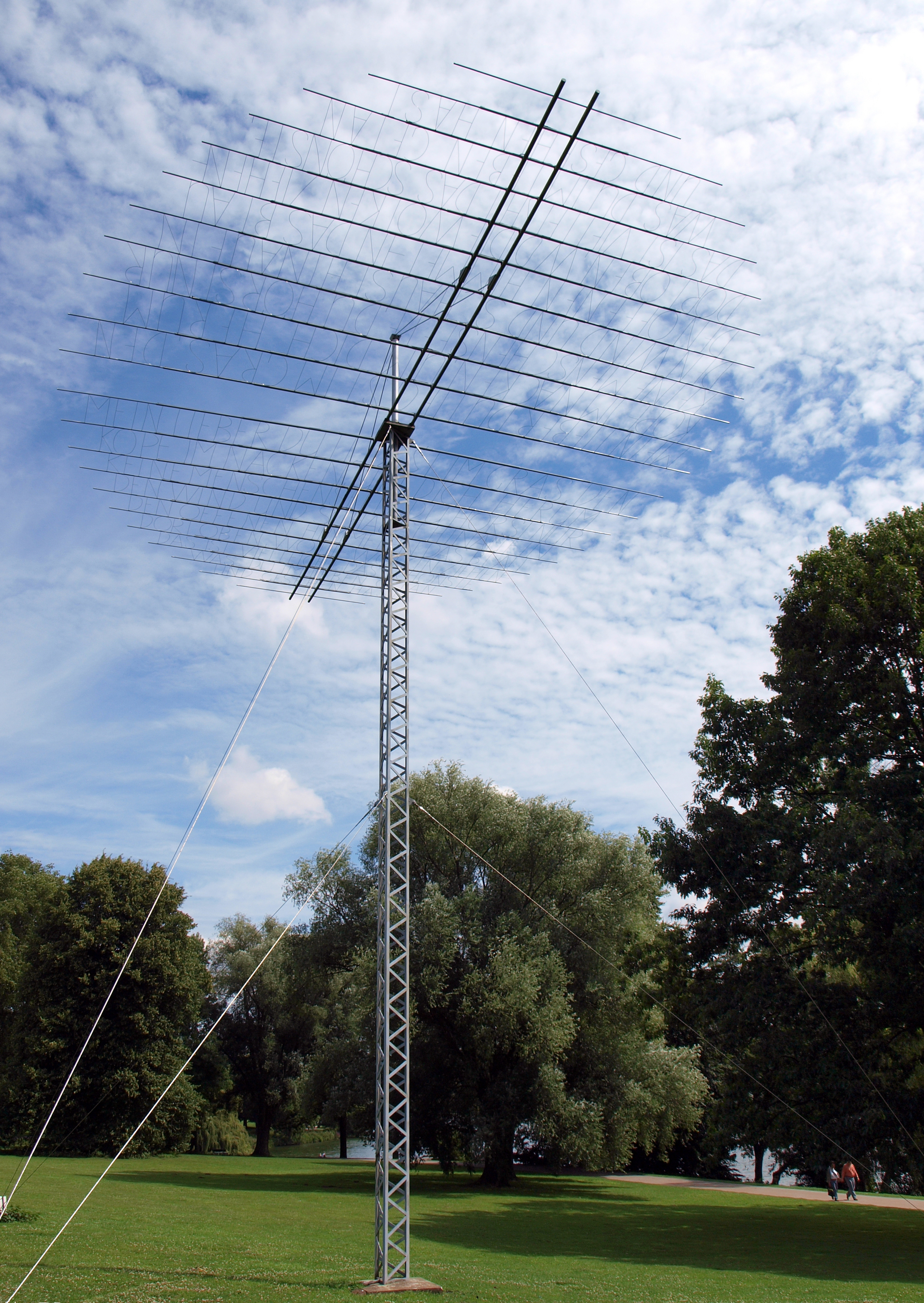
Installation of Ilya Kabakov for Skulptur Projekte Münster 1997

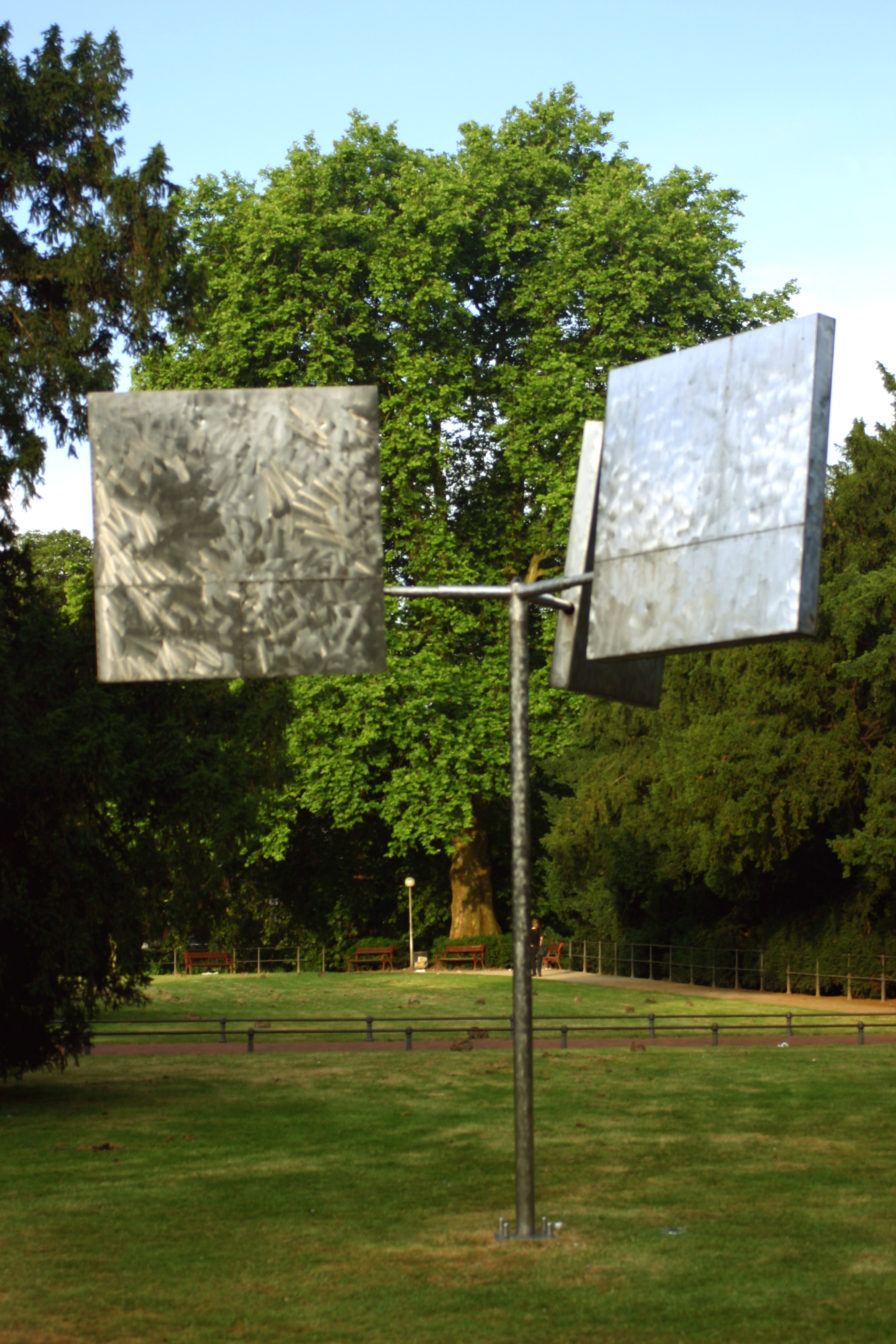
Drei rotierende Quadrate (Three rotary squares) by George Rickey

Skulptur Projekte Münster (Sculpture Projects Münster) is an exhibition of sculptures in public places in the city of Münster (Germany). Held every ten years since 1977, the exhibition shows works of invited international artists for free in different locations all over town, thereby confronting art with public places. After every exhibition, the city buys a few of the exhibited sculptures which are then installed permanently.

The 4th exhibition in 2007 took place from 16 June to 30 September. The fifth exhibition in 2017 took place from 10 June to 1 October.

== History ==
The story of the Sculpture Projects in Münster dates back to the 1970s when George Rickey placed his kinetic sculpture, "Drei rotierende Quadrate" in the German city of Münster. At the time there was a significant public outcry against placement of the artwork. To address this dissatisfaction and to attempt to bridge understanding about art in public places, Klaus Bussmann (then director of the Westfälisches Landesmuseum in Münster) undertook a series of lectures and presentations in 1977 at the museum.

It was as an extension of this outreach program that the idea for Sculpture Projects Münster was born with Bussmann and Kasper König (curator at Museum Ludwig) as the project's founders. Although protests of the project followed in latter years, the citizens of Münster eventually came to embrace the project, and are quite proud of it today, celebrating its presence in the city, as well as understanding the economical benefit it brings to this rather small college town. Some 35 works that premiered at previous Sculpture Projects were subsequently bought by the city. The 100-day event has taken place every 10 years since 1977 and is coordinated to occur concurrent with the Documenta exhibition, which takes place in Kassel, Germany, some 200 km or 125 miles away. The curatorial committee of the Sculpture Projects rotates with each of its manifestations and is meant to highlight the best example of sculptural artworks and installations from a worldwide selection of artists. Each artist then chooses a site in the city, and conceives a work with that site firmly in mind. The most recent manifestation of the Sculpture Projects, in the summer of 2007, was co-curated by Brigitte Franzen, Kasper König, and Carina Plath. For the first time, the exhibitions extends to the industrial city of Marl in 2017.

The $650,000 (1987) cost of the show is paid by Münster, the province of Westphalia, the state of North Rhine-Westphalia and private funds. In 1997 more than 500,000 visitors came to Münster to see the work of artists from 25 countries.

== Controversies ==
For the prominent Roman Catholic city of Münster, from which busloads of citizens visit Lourdes each year, German artist Katharina Fritsch produced a yellow life-size plaster version of the Lourdes Madonna in 1987. Shortly after the piece was installed on a street near the shopping center, market and cathedral, the praying hands were smashed; shortly after it was taken to the police station, it received gifts of flowers. The work is now being made in stone.

Bruce Nauman first proposed his inverted pyramid, sunk into the ground in front of the University of Münster's Department of Nuclear Physics, for the first Münster project, in 1977. Rejected by the State Building Authority, in 2007 Nauman offered his original proposal once more for the original 1977 price.

== Participating artists ==
=== 1977 ===
Carl Andre, Michael Asher, Joseph Beuys, Donald Judd, Richard Long, Bruce Nauman, Claes Oldenburg, Ulrich Rückriem, and Richard Serra

=== 1987 ===
Dennis Adams, Carl Andre, Giovanni Anselmo, Siah Armajani, Richard Artschwager, Michael Asher, Stephan Balkenhol, Lothar Baumgarten, Joseph Beuys, George Brecht, Daniel Buren, Scott Burton, Eduardo Chillida, Thierry De Cordier, Richard Deacon, Luciano Fabro, Robert Filliou, Ian Hamilton Finlay, Peter Fischli & David Weiss, Katharina Fritsch, Isa Genzken, Ludger Gerdes, Dan Graham, Rodney Graham, Hans Haacke, Keith Haring, Ernst Hermanns, Georg Herold, Jenny Holzer, Rebecca Horn, Shirazeh Houshiary, Thomas Huber, Donald Judd, Hubert Kiecol, Per Kirkeby, Harald Klingelhöller, Jeff Koons, Raimund Kummer, Ange Leccia, Sol LeWitt, Mario Merz, Olaf Metzel, François Morellet, Reinhard Mucha, Matt Mullican, Bruce Nauman, Maria Nordman, Claes Oldenburg, Nam June Paik, A. R. Penck, Giuseppe Penone, Hermann Pitz, Fritz Rahmann, Ulrich Rückriem, Reiner Ruthenbeck, Thomas Schütte, Richard Serra, Susana Solano, Ettore Spalletti, Thomas Struth, Richard Tuttle, Franz West, Rémy Zaugg

=== 1997 ===
Kim Adams, Carl Andre, Michael Asher, Georg Baselitz, Alighiero e Boetti, Christine Borland, Daniel Buren, Janet Cardiff, Maurizio Cattelan, Eduardo Chillida, Stephen Craig, Richard Deacon, Mark Dion, Stan Douglas, Maria Eichhorn, Ayşe Erkmen, Peter Fischli & David Weiss, Isa Genzken, Paul-Armand Gette, Jef Geys, Douglas Gordon, Dan Graham, Marie-Ange Guilleminot, Hans Haacke, Raymond Hains, Georg Herold, Thomas Hirschhorn, Rebecca Horn, Huang Yong Ping, Bethan Huws, Fabrice Hybert, Ilya Kabakov, Tadashi Kawamata, Martin Kippenberger, Per Kirkeby, Jeff Koons, Svetlana Kopystiansky, Sol LeWitt, Atelier van Lieshout, Olaf Metzel, Reinhard Mucha, Maria Nordman, Claes Oldenburg / Coosje van Bruggen, Gabriel Orozco, Tony Oursler, Nam June Paik, Jorge Pardo, Hermann Pitz, Marjetica Potrc, Charles Ray, Tobias Rehberger, Ulrich Rückriem, Allen Ruppersberg, Reiner Ruthenbeck, Kurt Ryslavy, Karin Sander, Thomas Schütte, Richard Serra, Roman Signer, Andreas Slominski, Yutaka Sone, Diana Thater, Bert Theis, Rirkrit Tiravanija, Eulàlia Valldosera, Herman de Vries, Lawrence Weiner, Franz West, Rachel Whiteread, Elin Wikström, Wolfgang Winter / Berthold Hörbelt, Jeffrey Wisniewski, Andrea Zittel, Heimo Zobernig

=== 2007 ===
Pawel Althamer, Francis Alÿs, Michael Asher, Guy Ben-Ner, Guillaume Bijl, Martin Boyce, Jeremy Deller, Elmgreen and Dragset, Hans-Peter Feldmann, Dora García, Isa Genzken, Dominique Gonzalez-Foerster, Tue Greenfort, David Hammons, Valérie Jouve, Mike Kelley, Suchan Kinoshita, Marko Lehanka, Eva Meyer and Eran Schaerf, Deimantas Narkevicius, Bruce Nauman, Maria Pask, Manfred Pernice, Susan Philipsz, Martha Rosler, Thomas Schütte, Andreas Siekmann, Rosemarie Trockel, Silke Wagner, Mark Wallinger, Clemens von Wedemeyer, Annette Wehrmann, Pae White

=== 2017 ===
Ei Arakawa-Nash, Aram Bartholl, Nairy Baghramian, Cosima von Bonin / Tom Burr, Andreas Bunte, Gerard Byrne, CAMP (Shaina Anand and Ashok Sukumaran), Michael Dean, Jeremy Deller, Nicole Eisenman, Ayşe Erkmen, Lara Favaretto, Hreinn Friðfinnsson, Monika Gintersdorfer / Knut Klaßen, Pierre Huyghe, John Knight, Xavier Le Roy with Scarlet Yu, Justin Matherly, Sany, Christian Odzuck, Emeka Ogboh, Peles Empire, Alexandra Pirici, Mika Rottenberg, Gregor Schneider, Thomas Schütte, Nora Schultz, Michael Smith, Hito Steyerl, Koki Tanaka, Oscar Tuazon, Joëlle Tuerlinckx, Cerith Wyn Evans, Hervé Youmbi, Bárbara Wagner / Benjamin de Búrca

=== 2027 ===
Mercedes Azpilicueta, Ali Cherri, Alice Creischer und Andreas Siekmann, Nolan Oswald Dennis, Róza El-Hassan, Vlatka Horvat, Iman Issa, Anton Kats, Kapwani Kiwanga, Hew Locke, Oscar Murillo, Myvillages, Kosen Ohtsubo, Khalil Rabah, Ashfika Rahman, Natascha Sadr Haghighian, Selma Selman, Iza Tarasewicz.

== Permanent works ==
Unlike most art exhibitions Münster Sculpture Projects does not entirely disappear at the closing date. A total of 39 works from previous Sculpture Projects remain in place, creating an argumentative walk-through history of site-specific sculpture, public art and monuments.

- 1st Sculpture Projects (1977): Untitled by Donald Judd
- 1st Sculpture Projects (1977): Square Depression by Bruce Nauman, realized in 2007
- 1st Sculpture Projects (1977): Giant Pool Balls by Claes Oldenburg
- 2nd Sculpture Projects (1987): Octagon for Münster by Dan Graham
- 2nd Sculpture Projects (1987): Bodennrelief für die chemischen Institute by Matt Mullican
- 3rd Sculpture Projects (1997): Pier by Jorge Pardo
- 3rd Sculpture Projects (1997): sanctuarium by Herman de Vries
- 3rd Sculpture Projects (1997): Look up and read the words … by Ilya Kabakov
- 4th Sculpture Projects (2007): We are still and reflective by Martin Boyce
- 4th Sculpture Projects (2007): Less sauvage than others by Rosemarie Trockel
