= Ludger Gerdes =

German painter

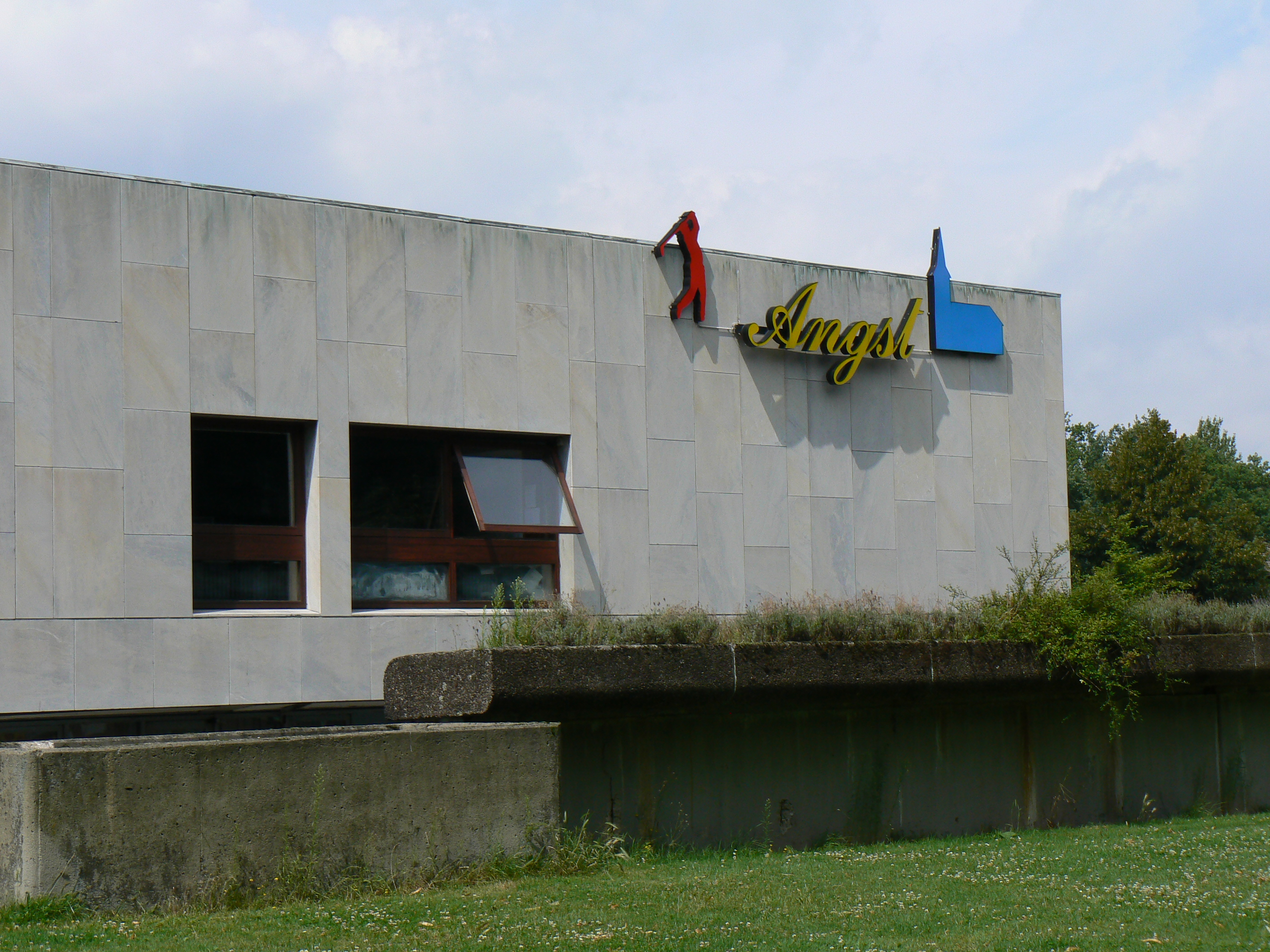
Ludger Gerdes, Angst, 1989, town hall, Marl, Germany

Ludger Gerdes (10 April 1954, Lastrup, (Germany) – 17 October 2008 near Dülmen) was a German painter, sculptor and multimedia artist.

== Life ==
After his school-leaving examination (Abitur) at the secondary school Antonianum in Vechta, Ludger Gerdes studied at the Academy of Arts in Münster with Timm Ulrichs and Lothar Baumgarten from 1975 to 1977, and from 1977 to 1982 at the Düsseldorf Academy of Arts with Gerhard Richter. At the beginning of the 1980s Gerdes stood out in exhibitions and actions with his criticism of the link between modern art, the museum and the temporary exhibition. At this time he exhibited among others along with Thomas Schütte. He pleaded for works of art as a means for the organization of public space and as a medium of communication. The English landscape garden was a particularly important historical model of this to him. At this time he was regarded as the intellectual head of the artist-group of Düsseldorf pattern makers (Düsseldorfer Modellbauer). In 1982 he was included in the documenta 7 in Kassel. He became known to a larger public in 1987 with his land art project A Ship for Münster (Ein Schiff für Münster) for the show "Skulptur.Projekte" in Münster. From 1990 to 1992 he taught at the Städelschule, Frankfurt; from 1998 to 2004 he was professor for painting and multimedia at the art academy in Karlsruhe; since 2005 he was professor for painting at the Muthesius Art Academy in Kiel. Parallel to his professorship he lived and worked as an artist in Munich and Düsseldorf.

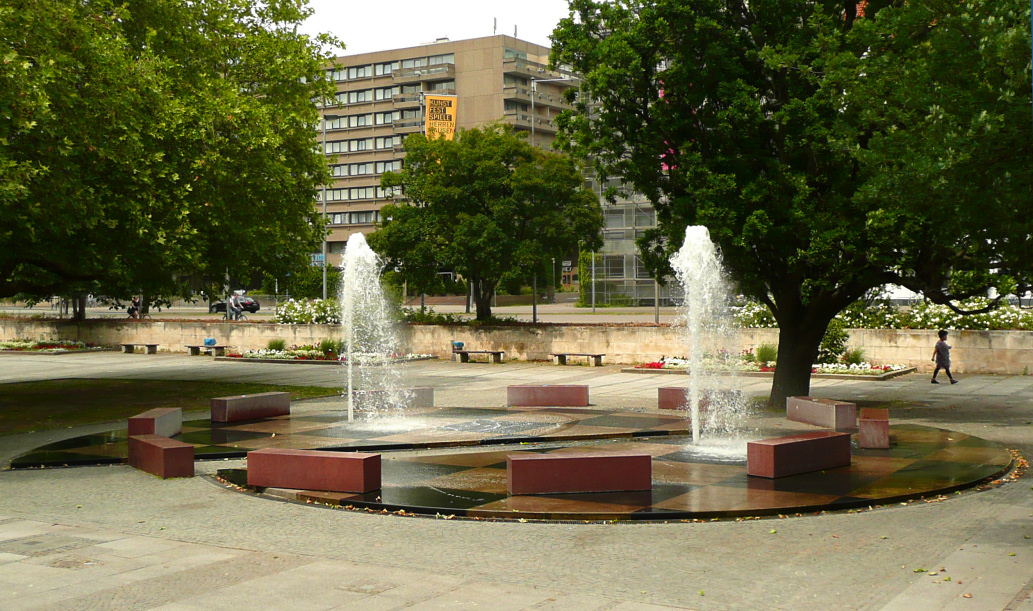
Ludger Gerdes, Klaus Bahlsen-fountain in Hannover, Germany

Ludger Gerdes worked in a dual way within the realms of fine arts and philosophy: His large scale-painting pursued questions of the surface and picture reality, his sculptures explored the degree of reality of objects as well as their public function. Gerdes dealt with this ultimately political position within art especially, not only as a visual artist, but also, very effectively, as a theoretical author and performer. Experts regard him as a silent, however important artist of his generation, whose "visual metaphors” in the public space formulated a philosophical and aesthetic reflection of human existence, like for example, the neon sculpture ICHS (1989) in the garden of the Museum Haus Esters in Krefeld. The last years of his work were dedicated to public sculpture and the aesthetic quarrel with public space, documented by a photo series of 140 town squares in Europe. A new group of works consisting of conceptual diptychs combined literary and philosophical texts with photography. His last great public project was the design of Walter Sedlmayr square in Munich in 2003. Ludger Gerdes died on October, 17th 2008 in a car accident.

== See also ==
- List of German painters

== English literature ==
- Ludger Gerdes / Jeffrey Schwartz: Art as a Model. In: La Piz. [engl.edition] No. 87, May/June 1987, p. 28–35.
- Ludger Gerdes: Off the Bandwagon of Progress – But then what? In: Cahier 1, ed. by. Mat Verberkt, Witte de With, Rotterdam 1993, p. 122–129. ISBN 90-73362-27-X
- Dan Graham interviewed by Ludger Gerdes (1991), in: Dan Graham: Two-Way Mirror Power. Selected Writings by Dan Graham on his Art, ed. by Alexander Alberro. Cambridge, Mass. 1999, p. 62–83. ISBN 978-0-262-57130-2
- Ludger Gerdes: On the Trialectic of Place, Art and Public. In: Espaces d'espace / The Eighties. Centre National d'Art Contemporain de Grenoble, 2008, p. 132–145. ISBN 978-2-906732-83-4
- Ludger Gerdes. Paralipomena, ed. by Thomas Schütte and Julian Heynen. Cologne 2010. ISBN 978-3-86560-767-6
