= Marjetica Potrč =

Slovenian artist and architect

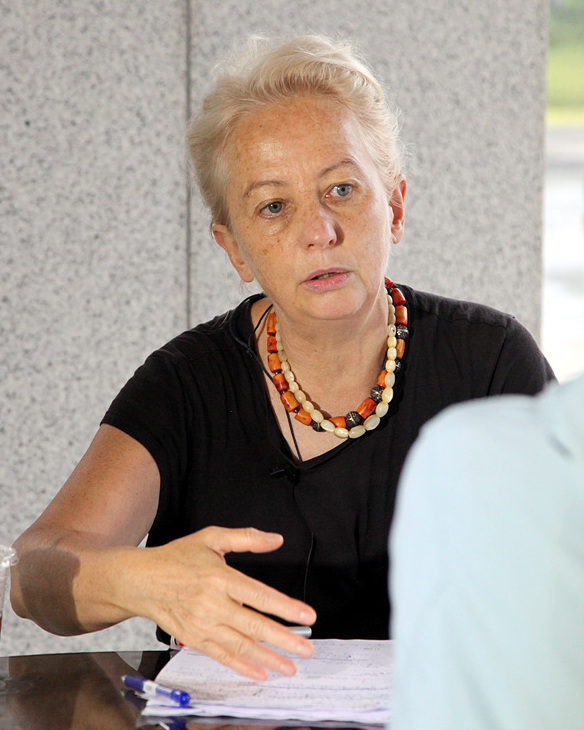
- Marjetica Potrč in 2010
- Born: 1953 (age 72–73); Ljubljana, Socialist Republic of Slovenia, Socialist Federal Republic of Yugoslavia
- Occupations: Artist, Architect
- Known for: Conceptual art, contemporary art, participatory design
- Website: www.potrc.org

Marjetica Potrč ([maˈɾjeːtitsa pɔˈtəɾtʃ]; born 1953) is an artist and architect based in Ljubljana, Slovenia. Potrč's interdisciplinary practice includes on-site projects, research, architectural case studies, and drawings (visual essays and diagrams). Her work documents and interprets contemporary architectural practices (in particular, with regard to energy infrastructure and water use) and the ways people live together. She is especially interested in social architecture and how communities and governments can work together to make stronger, more resilient cities. In later projects, she has also focused on the relationship between human society and nature, and advocated for the rights of nature.

Her work almost always involves collaborations, both with other artists, architects, and specialists from various disciplines as well as with local communities. "Her projects display a unique sensibility for identifying the existing social capital in a community, which she utilizes as she works to find solutions to everyday problems." (statement from the Curry Stone Foundation). Through these collaborations, including, especially, with the students in her Design for the Living World class, her work explores new methodologies, tools, and strategies that local residents can use to make their communities and living environments better able to respond to future challenges. She describes such collaborative work as a "partnership in knowledge exchange" and stresses the importance of developing new alliances, such as between environmentalists and Indigenous peoples, to create a new "hybrid" knowledge that goes beyond the standardized, objective knowledge of the modernist discourse.

== Background and early career ==
Potrč was born in Ljubljana, the capital of Slovenia, then part of the Socialist Federal Republic of Yugoslavia. Her parents were both writers. Her father, Ivan Potrč, was a well-known Slovenian social realist novelist and playwright, originally from the Styria region, and the main editor at the Mladinska Knjiga publishing house. Her mother, Branka Jurca, was a teacher, magazine editor, and well-known children’s author. She was born in the Karst region of western Slovenia but moved to Maribor, where she met Marjetica's father.

Marjetica Potrč received degrees in architecture (1978) and sculpture (1986, 1988) from the University of Ljubljana. In 1990, she moved to the United States. Her installations from this period often involved various kinds of walls; for example, Two Faces of Utopia (1993, made for the Slovenian Pavilion at the Venice Biennial), and the series Theatrum Mundi: Territories (1993–1996). At the time, she noted: "I don't make objects. I build walls" – a statement that positions her work against object-based sculpture. In 1994, she moved back to Ljubljana. Since then, Potrč's work has developed at the intersection of visual art, architecture, and the social sciences.

== Work ==
=== On-site projects ===
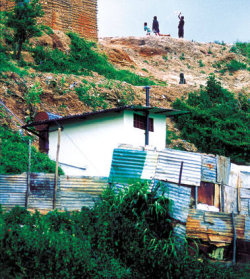
Dry Toilet, 2003, La Vega barrio, Caracas

In 2003, Potrč was invited to spend six months in Caracas, Venezuela, as part of the Caracas Case Project, and carry out research on the informal city. There, in collaboration with the Israeli architect Liyat Esakov and local residents, she developed the project Dry Toilet, in which an ecologically safe, waterless toilet was installed in the upper part of the La Vega barrio, a district in Caracas that has no access to the municipal water grid. Dry Toilet is one of a series of community-focused on-site projects by Potrč that are characterized by participatory design and a concern with sustainability issues, particularly in relation to energy and water infrastructures. Other important projects are Power from Nature (Barefoot College, Rajasthan, India, and the Catherine Ferguson Academy, Detroit, Mich., USA, 2005), The Cook, the Farmer, His Wife and Their Neighbour (Stedelijk Goes West, Amsterdam, 2009), Rainwater Harvesting on a Farm in the Venice Lagoon (Sant'Erasmo Island, Venice Lagoon, 2010), The Soweto Project (9UB, Soweto, South Africa, 2014), and Of Soil and Water: King's Cross Pond Club (Relay Art Programme, King's Cross, London, 2015). In Potrč's view, sustainable solutions that are implemented and disseminated by communities serve to empower these communities and help create a democracy built from below.

From 2011 to 2018, Marjetica Potrč was a professor of social design at the University of Fine Arts/HFBK in Hamburg, Germany, where she taught Design for the Living World, a class on participatory practices. She and her students carried out participatory design projects in various countries around the globe (Germany, Greece, Israel, Mexico, the United States, and South Africa, to name just a few). In these projects, Potrč and her students saw themselves as mediators and collaborators with the community and developed new methodologies and a new vocabulary for their participatory practice, such as "rituals of transition", "relational objects", and "performative actions", among others.

In an interview with Laura Bernhardt, Potrč noted: "This is how I understand my role as a mediator in participatory practices and in collaborative projects. When, as an artist, designer or architect your involvement is creating and fostering relations, you understand it as a laboratory where you and the others—the local residents—are testing ideas, exchanging knowledge, and becoming involved in local governance. You see that you are not “merely” a co-author but also the mediator of a process. And what can be better? The artist or designer involved in these projects has to trust the conceptual framework of the project. So basically, it’s not about following established values, but about creating new values that correspond to contemporary times."

The Soweto Project (2014) is of particular note. She and the class spent two months in the Soweto district of Johannesburg, where they worked with the residents of the Orlando East neighborhood to transform a degraded public space that was being used as a dumping ground into a community space.

Since 2010, Potrč has collaborated on a number of projects with the architectural and design practice Ooze (Eva Pfannes and Sylvain Hartenberg), based in Rotterdam. These projects, which focus largely on water purification, include Between the Waters: The Emscher Community Garden in Essen, Germany (2010), where they constructed a complete sustainable water supply system on an island in the Emscher River; Of Soil and Water: King's Cross Pond Club, in London (2015), where they created a natural swimming pond with its own micro-ecological environment on a construction site; and Future Island, on the Albano Campus of Stockholm University (2023), in which they created an island with separate heated and unheated zones that stage the effects of climate change in real time.

=== Architectural case studies ===
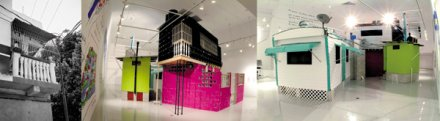
Hybrid House: Caracas, West Bank, West Palm Beach, 2003, Palm Beach Institute of Contemporary Art, Lake Worth, Florida

Potrč's large gallery installations, which she calls "architectural case studies," are a unique practice that has long been a central part of her work. These houses, which she describes as "theatrical objects", represent real-life architectural practices as they relate to environmental, social, economic, and political issues. The source of the work is always acknowledged, and a black-and-white documentary photograph of the original situation is presented as part of the documentation.

For example, Hybrid House: Caracas, West Bank, West Palm Beach (Palm Beach Institute of Contemporary Art, Lake Worth, Florida, 2003), illustrates how three very different 21st-century communities — a Caracas barrio, a Jewish settlement on the West Bank, and a temporary housing community in West Palm Beach, Florida — negotiate issues of space, security, energy, water, and communications in contested environments.

Another architectural case study, Duncan Village Core Unit, first presented in 2002 at Galerie Nordenhake in Berlin, offers an example of collaboration between municipal government (in this case, in East London, South Africa) and residents: the city provided service core units connected to the water, energy, and sewage infrastructure, and the new residents built their homes around them. In later installations, new elements were added, such as a water tank, a satellite dish, a sunshade, a house, and urban agriculture, to illustrate the kind of growing structure built by the residents.

Potrč describes the architectural case study Caracas: Growing Houses, first exhibited in Architektonika 2, at the Hamburger Bahnhof – Museum of Contemporary Art in Berlin in 2012, as a "three-dimensional portrait of an informal city."

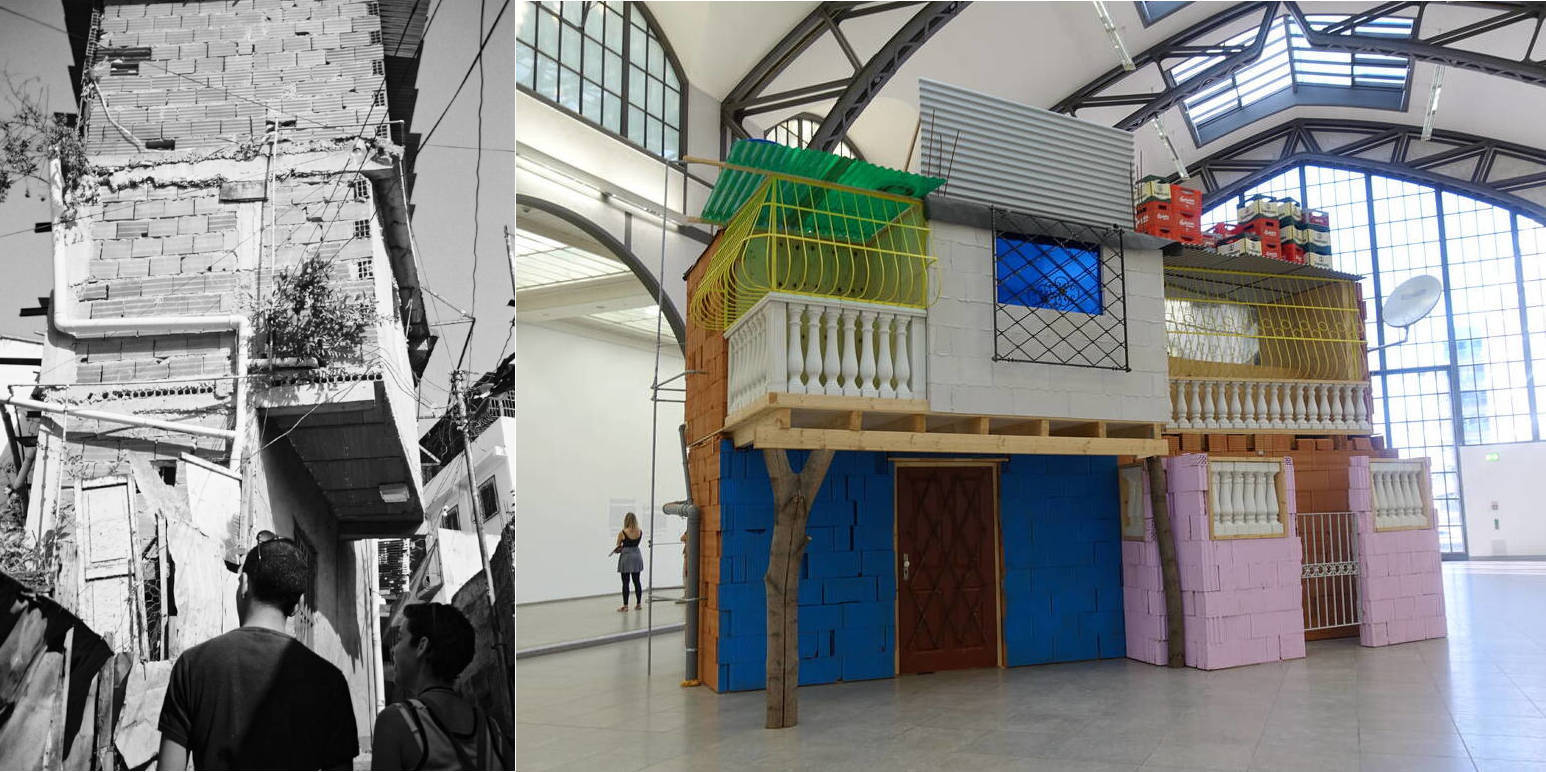
Caracas: Growing Houses, 2018, Hello World: Revising a Collection, Hamburger Bahnhof – Museum of Contemporary Art, Berlin

Two self-built houses from a Caracas barrio negotiate their presence and shared infrastructure. In contrast to the modernist city of Caracas, the rural-like informal city of the barrios foregrounds community and not individualism. The houses "grow" in two ways, Potrč explains. First, because you see that this is self-built architecture, and second, because the architecture grows and changes as the families who live there grow and interact with each other: "Existence is always a coexistence."

The School of the Forest/Miami Campus (2015) is an architectural case study of a community center in the Amazonian state of Acre, in Brazil. It draws its inspiration from the Universidade da Floresta, an initiative launched in Acre in 2005, that brings together knowledge from local communities with scientific knowledge, treating both systems with equal respect. In the exhibition at the Pérez Art Museum Miami, a series of lectures, seminars, and workshops were held in the building constructed in the gallery.

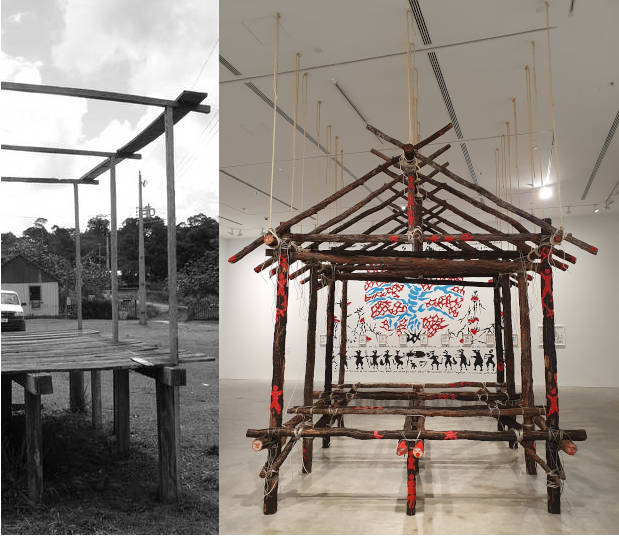
The House of Agreement Between Humans and the Earth, 2022, 23rd Biennale of Sydney: rīvus, Museum of Contemporary Art Australia, Sydney

The case study The House of Agreement Between Humans and the Earth (2022), inspired by the palafitas of Amazonia, is a simple wooden house held together by fiber rope. The work combines built architecture with the notion of social architecture in dialogue with nature. The base, representing earth, supports the world of social agreements, including agreements between humanity and nature. Ropes extending to the gallery ceiling – connecting earth and sky – represent human dependence on and coexistence with nature. Drawn images on the structure illustrate such agreement as reflected in society and the life of the planet, in particular the struggle for the rights of nature in Australia. The work was exhibited at the 23rd Biennale of Sydney in 2022.

=== Research projects ===
Ever since her six-month research residency in Caracas, in 2003, Potrč's practice has included extended research projects in regions that are reinventing themselves. Among these, the most significant have been her projects in the Amazonian state of Acre in western Brazil in 2006 (in conjunction with the São Paulo Art Biennial); the Lost Highway Expedition, in nine cities in the Western Balkans, which she co-organized in collaboration with a group of artists and architects; her research project on water issues in post-Katrina New Orleans (2007); and her multipartite installation for the 23rd Biennale of Sydney (2022), which focused on the rights of rivers and the human relationship with nature, in which she collaborated with the Wiradjuri elder Ray Woods. As noted earlier, collaboration with individuals, groups, and organizations is an integral part of nearly all her research projects.

=== Visual essays and diagrams ===
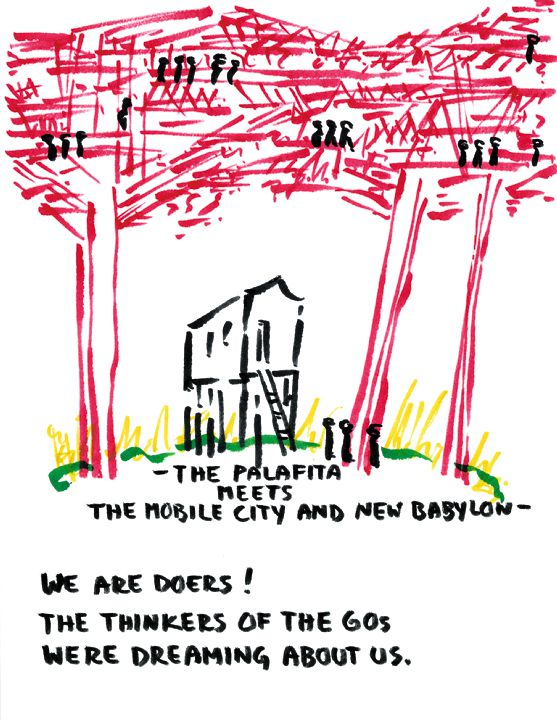
Florestania, 2010, no. 10 of 12 drawings

These research projects provide the basis not only for her architectural case studies but also for visual essays and large-format diagrams, which present her findings to wider audiences. Potrč constructs her visual essays as narratives that use simple images and text to convey and interpret the challenges and strategies of the communities she has studied. Such works include, among others, The Struggle for Spatial Justice (2005), Florestania (2006), The Citizens of Duncan Village Speak Out (2012), The Struggle for Natural Justice (2017), and, for the Biennale of Sydney, The Rights of a River (2021) and The Life of the Lachlan River (2022). Her diagrams include The Great Republic of New Orleans (2007), The Earth Drawings (2009–2019), and The World in the Age of Stories (2020). The diagrams are often exhibited as wall drawings, as in her presentation at 23rd Biennale of Sydney.

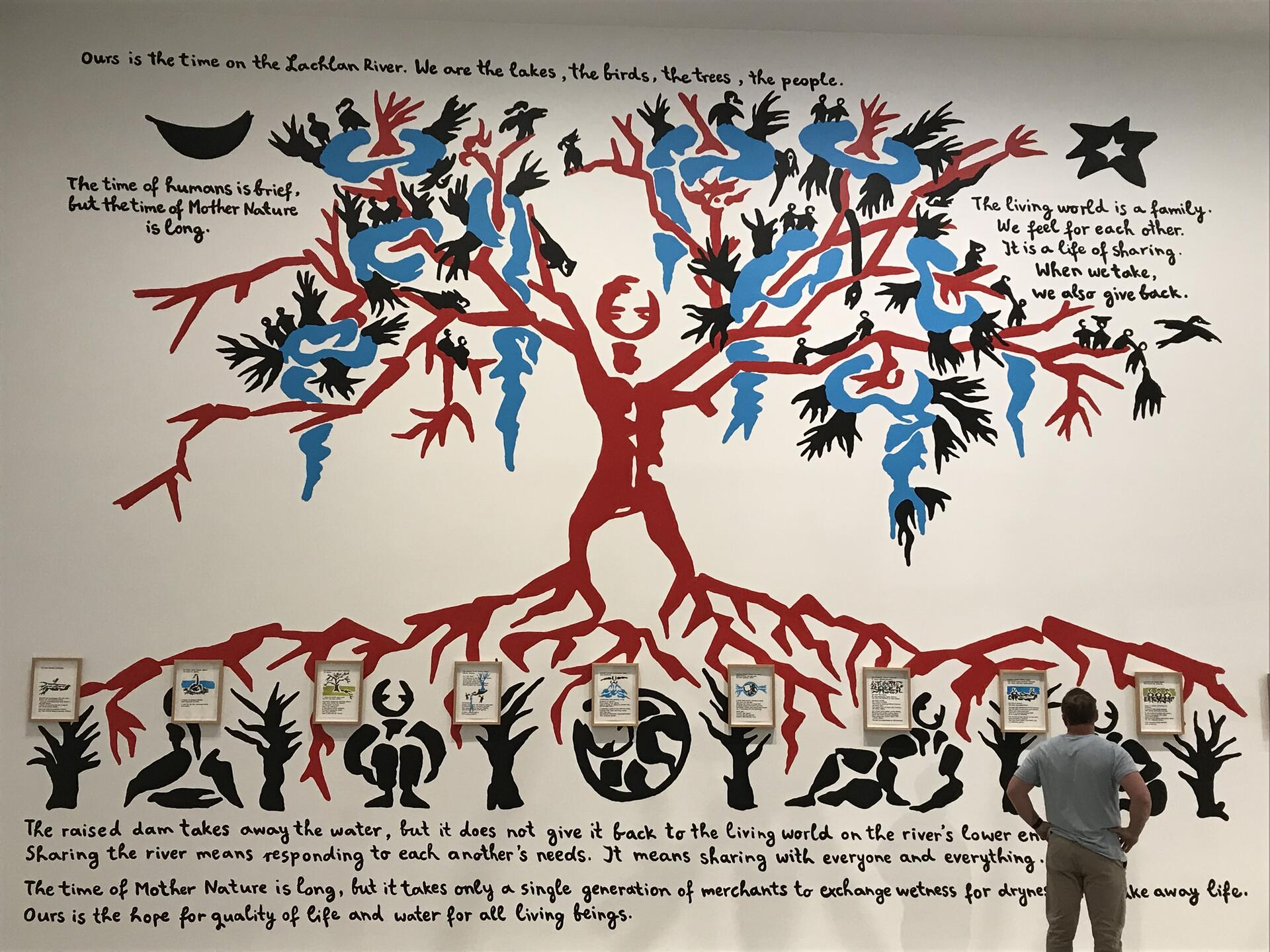
The Time on the Lachlan River, 2022, wall drawing based on the original drawing, 23rd Biennale of Sydney: rīvus, Museum of Contemporary Art Australia, Sydney

== Notable exhibitions ==
Potrč's work has been featured in major international exhibitions, including:

- Skulptur Projekte Münster (1997)
- São Paulo Biennial (1996, 2006)
- Venice Biennale of Art (1993, 2003, 2009)
- Yinchuan Biennial (2018)
- Biennale of Sydney (2022)

Since 2003, she has regularly shown her work at Galerie Nordenhake in Berlin and Stockholm, as well as, formerly, at the Max Protetch Gallery (2002–2009) and the Meulensteen Gallery (2009–2012) in New York.

Important solo exhibitions include:

- Hugo Boss Prize 2000: Marjetica Potrč, Guggenheim Museum, New York (2001)
- Urgent Architecture, List Visual Arts Center, Massachusetts Institute of Technology, Cambridge, Massachusetts (2004)
- Personal States, Portikus, Frankfurt am Main (2006)
- Forest Rising, The Curve at the Barbican Art Gallery, London (2007)
- In a New Land, Galerie Nordenhake, Berlin (2011)
- Soweto House with Prepaid Water Meter, Eli and Edythe Broad Art Museum at Michigan State University, East Lansing, Michigan (2012)
- The School of the Forest/Miami Campus, Pérez Art Museum, Miami (2015)
- Acuerdo Social, FLORA ars+natura, Bogotá (2017)
- Shelter: Closed and Open, VISUAL Centre for Contemporary Art, Carlow, Ireland (2018)
- Water and Land, City Gallery, Piran, Slovenia (2022)

== Selected awards and grants ==
- The Medal of Merit of the Republic of Slovenia (2023)
- Curry Stone Design Prize (2008)
- Vera List Center for Arts and Politics Fellowship (2007–2008)
- Hugo Boss Prize (2000), administered by the Guggenheim Museum
- Pollock-Krasner Foundation grants (1993 and 1999)
- Prešeren Fund Award (1994)

== Selected bibliography ==
=== Book publications ===
- Marjetica Potrč, Urgent Architecture (2003). Edited by Michael Rush with essays by Carlos Basualdo, Liyat Esakov, Marjetica Potrč, Michael Rush, and Eyal Weizman. Lake Worth, Fla.: Palm Beach Institute of Contemporary Art.
- Marjetica Potrč, Next Stop, Kiosk (2003). Edited by Lívia Páldi with essays by Zdenka Badovinac, Hans Ulrich Obrist, Lívia Páldi, Marjetica Potrč, and Goran Tomčić. Ljubljana: Moderna galerija. Distributed by Revolver Archiv für aktuelle Kunst.
- Marjetica Potrč, Urban Negotiation (2003). Edited by Ana Maria Torres with essays by Kosme de Baranano, Ana Maria Torres, Marjetica Potrč, Max Protetch, and Francesco Careri. Valencia, Spain: Instituto Valenciano de Arte Moderno (IVAM).
- Marjetica Potrč, Florestania (2009). Hanover, NH: Dartmouth College.
- Marjetica Potrč and Design for the Living World, The Soweto Project (2014). Berlin: Archive Books.

=== Articles, reviews, and talks ===
- Carlos Basualdo and Reinaldo Laddaga, "Rules of Engagement," Artforum International, March 2004, pp. 166–170.
- Eleanor Heartney, "A House of Parts," Art in America, May 2004, pp. 140–143.
- Marco Scotini, "Dry Toilet," Domus, no. 891, Geo-Design (April 2006), pp. 88–91.
- Marjetica Potrč, "New Territories in Acre and Why They Matter", e-flux Journal, no. 00, November 2008. The essay was reprinted in Florestania (Dartmouth College, 2009) and the catalogues for the exhibitions The School of the Forest/Miami Campus (Perez Art Museum, Miami, 2015) and Eco-Visionaries (Bildmuseet, Umeå, Sweden, 2018).
- Anna Dezeuze, "Vivere di avversità: l'arte della precarietà / Thriving On Adversity: The Art of Precariousness", Lotus International, no. 143 (2010), p. 122–129. (In Italian and English.)
- "Interview with Marjetica Potrč", by Felix Meritis at the symposium "Actors, Agents and Attendants II: Housing the Social", SKOR, Foundation for Art and Public Domain, Amsterdam, December 13, 2011.
- Marjetica Potrč, "A Vision of the Future City and the Artist's Role as Mediator", talk at the Harvard Graduate School of Design, April 18, 2012.
- “Artists at Work: Marjetica Potrč”, interviewed by Berit Fischer, Afterall Online, June 2012.
- Linda Weintraub, "Marjetica Potrč: DIY Renewal for Slums and Condos", To Life!: Eco Art In Pursuit of a Sustainable Planet, University of California Press, 2012, pp. 247–252.
- Marjetica Potrč, "Public Space is a Social Agreement", talk for the Art, Culture and Technology Program, Massachusetts Institute of Technology, October 2015.
- Marjetica Potrč, "The Soweto Project". In Public Space? Lost and Found, Edited by Gediminas Urbonas, Ann Lui and Lucas Freeman, MIT Press, 2017, pp. 235–243.
- Marjetica Potrč, "Artist Talk", in conversation with Dr. Gabriele Knapstein, Galerie Nordenhake Berlin, September 2019.
- Marjetica Potrč, "On Collaboration", talk for the Of Public Interest Lab, Department for Research and Further Education in Architecture and Fine Art, Royal Institute of Art, Stockholm, November 2020.
- Marjetica Potrč, "The Artist as Mediator: Changing the Culture and Creating New Values", interviewed by Laura Bernhardt, Current - Kunst und Urbaner Raum (Stuttgart), no.1, 2021, p. 21–27. (In German and English.)
- Marjetica Potrč, "Artist Talk", in conversation with Gilly Karjevsky, at Galerie Nordenhake, Berlin, March 17, 2023.
- Marjetica Potrč, "The Personhood of Nature", talk and conversation with Nitin Bathla, Santiago del Hierro, Laura Turley, Anna Wienhues, and others, as part of the lecture series, Sessions on Territory: Urbanism in a Broken World: REPAIR, ETH Zurich D-ARCH, ONA Fokushalle E7, Zurich, May 25, 2023.
