= Hreinn Friðfinnsson =

Icelandic artist (1943–2024)

- Born: Hreinn Friðfinnsson; February 19, 1943; Bær, Dalir, Dalasýsla, Iceland
- Died: March 6, 2024 (aged 81); Amsterdam, Netherlands
- Education: Icelandic Academy of Arts and Crafts, Reykjavík (1958–1960)
- Known for: Conceptual art, installation, photography
- Notable work: The House Project (1974–2017)
- Movement: Conceptual art
- Awards: Ars Fennica Prize (2000); Carnegie Art Award (2000); Prince Eugen Medal (2004)
- Website: hreinnfridfinnsson.com

Hreinn Friðfinnsson (19 February 1943 – 6 March 2024) was an Icelandic conceptual artist working with installation, photography and everyday objects. Born in Bær, Dalir, Dalasýsla, Iceland, he was one of the pioneering figures of Icelandic conceptual art and a founding member of SÚM, the influential avant-garde collective established in Reykjavík in 1965. In 1971 he moved to Amsterdam, where he lived and worked for the rest of his life, developing a practice in close dialogue with the international conceptual art scene. His work, known for its poetic logic, subtle gestures, and open-ended form, is held in major public collections across Europe and Iceland. He died in Amsterdam on 6 March 2024.

== Early life and education ==
Hreinn Friðfinnsson was born on 19 February 1943 in Bær, Dalir, Dalasýsla, a rural area in western Iceland. He grew up on a farm, and later described the natural environment and the isolation of the Icelandic countryside as formative for his imagination and his sense of time and place. He began drawing in early childhood, encountering art largely through newspapers and magazines; he later recalled the particular impact of seeing reproductions of abstract painting, including works by Mondrian.

At the age of 15 he was admitted to the Icelandic Academy of Arts and Crafts in Reykjavík, which he attended from 1958 to 1960, continuing to live and work on the farm during this period. In his mid-twenties he spent two summers working as a mountain guard in the Icelandic highlands, walking long distances while overseeing grazing areas — an experience he would later return to in the work Frequent Long Walks (2016).

== Career ==
=== Early career and SÚM (1965–1970) ===
In 1965, Friðfinnsson became one of the four founding members of SÚM, a collective that sought to radically renew Icelandic contemporary art. The group opened its own gallery in Reykjavík in 1969, creating a space for experimental practices and international dialogue. SÚM played a central role in introducing conceptual and avant-garde practices to Iceland.

=== Amsterdam (1971–1980) ===
In 1971, Friðfinnsson moved to the Netherlands, first to Haarlem and then to Amsterdam, where he would live and work for the rest of his life. Together with his wife Hlín Svavarsdóttir, a dancer with the Dutch National Ballet, he ran Gallery Fignal, a home-based exhibition programme held in the narrow corridor of their apartment on Nieuwe Kerkstraat in Amsterdam, where they invited musicians and artists to participate. In 1972, he became one of nine founding members of the In-Out Center, the first artist-run space in Amsterdam, which was active until 1974 and played a key role in the early development of performance, video, sound, conceptual art, and artists' books in the Netherlands.

In 1977, Friðfinnsson participated in Ça va? Ça va. 4 constats islandais at the Centre Georges Pompidou in Paris, one of the earliest exhibitions at the newly opened museum, alongside Kristján Guðmundsson, Sigurður Guðmundsson, and Ben Sveinsson, with a foreword by the museum's first director, Pontus Hultén.

=== International recognition (1980s–1990s) ===
Through the 1980s and 1990s Friðfinnsson exhibited widely across Europe, with solo presentations at MAGASIN – Centre National d'Art Contemporain in Grenoble (1987), the ICA Amsterdam (1992), and the National Gallery of Iceland (1993). In 1993 he represented Iceland at the 45th Venice Biennale. In 2000 he received both the Ars Fennica Prize and second prize in the Carnegie Art Award, and in 2004 was awarded the Prince Eugen Medal.

=== Later career (2000s–2024) ===
In 2007 a major retrospective of his work was presented at the Serpentine Gallery in London and the Reykjavík Art Museum. In 2017 he participated in Skulptur Projekte Münster with the Fourth House, the latest work in his long-running House Project. His retrospective To Catch a Fish with a Song: 1964–Today travelled to the Centre d'Art Contemporain Genève and KW Institute for Contemporary Art in Berlin in 2019, accompanied by the publication of his first catalogue raisonné by Koenig Books. From November 2021 to May 2022, For the Time Being was presented at the Museum of Art and Design at Miami Dade College.

Friðfinnsson died in Amsterdam on 6 March 2024, at the age of 81. Following his death, the Reykjavík Art Museum dedicated the exhibition From Time – To Time to his memory.

== The House Project (1974–2017) ==
The House Project is a long-running series of works begun in 1974, comprising four structures built across Iceland, France, and Germany over more than four decades.

First House (1974), Iceland, was inspired by an anecdote in Íslenskur aðall (Icelandic Aristocracy, 1938) by the Icelandic writer Þórbergur Þórðarson, about an eccentric figure named Sólon Guðmundsson who attempted to build a house "inside out" by reversing its conventional elements. In the summer of 1974, Friðfinnsson built a small house in a remote, uninhabited area of Iceland where no other human-made objects were visible. The structure reversed the typical order of domestic shelter, with wallpaper and curtains placed on the exterior and corrugated iron on the inside. Friðfinnsson described the work as proposing that the house could encompass the world.

Second House (2007–08) is a permanent installation at Domaine de Kerguéhennec in Bignan, France. The work appears as a conventional small house but is sealed and can only be viewed through its windows. Inside are framed photographs documenting the First House, a suspended meteorite, and a small outline model referring to the next stage of the project.

Third House (2011) was installed on the original site of the First House in Iceland. Unlike its predecessors it is not an enclosed building but a stainless-steel skeletal frame with no exterior walls, existing as an open outline that marks the site of the original structure.

Fourth House (2017) was presented at Skulptur Projekte Münster in Sternbuschpark, Münster, Germany. A stainless-steel house outline with a fully polished reflective surface, the work mirrors its surroundings. After the exhibition it was permanently installed at Jäckering Mühlen- und Nährmittelwerke GmbH in Hamm, Germany.

== Awards and recognition ==
- 1994 — Estrand Foundation Art Prize
- 2000 — Ars Fennica Prize
- 2000 — Second Prize, Carnegie Art Award
- 2004 — Prince Eugen Medal
- 2024 — Honorary Award, Icelandic Art Prize (Myndlistarráð)

== Public collections ==
Works by Friðfinnsson are held in public collections including the National Gallery of Iceland (Listasafn Íslands), Reykjavík; the Reykjavík Art Museum; the Living Art Museum (Nýlistasafnið), Reykjavík; the Centre Pompidou, Paris; the Stedelijk Museum, Amsterdam; Moderna Museet, Stockholm; Kiasma, Helsinki; Kunstmuseum Liechtenstein, Vaduz; the Nasjonalmuseet, Oslo; and Arter, Istanbul. Works are also held in French public collections including the CNAP (Fonds national d'art contemporain) and various FRAC collections.
