= Josip Križaj (aviator) =

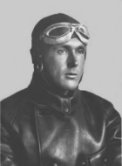
- Born: 13 March 1911; Kopriva, Austria-Hungary, now Slovenia
- Died: 8 October 1948 (aged 37); Snežnik Plateau, Yugoslavia, now Slovenia
- Military career
- Allegiance: Kingdom of Italy; Second Spanish Republic; Kingdom of Yugoslavia; Socialist Federal Republic of Yugoslavia
- Branch: Air forces
- Service years: 1930–1948
- Nicknames: Pepi; Nom de guerre: José Antonio Galiasso
- Units: Squadron España; 11th Fighter Squadron NOVJ
- Conflicts: Spanish Civil War: Catalan battlefield; World War II: Balkan battlefield
- Awards: Order of courage

Josip Križaj (13 March 1911 – 8 October 1948), also known by the Italianized name Giuseppe Krizai, nicknamed Pepi, was a Slovene (Yugoslav) military pilot and a veteran of the Spanish Civil War.

Križaj was born in Kopriva on the Karst Plateau, then part of the Austro-Hungarian county of Gorizia and Gradisca. After World War I, the region became part of the Kingdom of Italy and Križaj became an Italian citizen. Already at a young age he showed a passion for flight, which led him to pursue a pilot's course at the royal officer school in Capua near Naples, Italy.

Due to his Slovene ethnic origins, he was not allowed into the regular Italian Royal Air Force, but he was nevertheless granted a place in the reserves. Because of the physical hardships endured during the training and his pro-Slovenian and pro-Yugoslav national political stance, he flew a Fiat AS.1 airplane on 25 June 1932 from Udine to Ljubljana, crossing the border of Yugoslavia, which led to much media interest. In 1934, he became a Yugoslav citizen. Following the outbreak of the Spanish Civil War, he joined the Yugoslav volunteers that fought on the side of the Spanish Republic. He was a member of the Squadron España, and was shot down once and captured during the war. After his return to Yugoslavia, he moved to Serbia, where he lived during World War II.

After the war, he became a SFR Yugoslav Air Force military pilot. His life ended on 8 October 1948, when his aircraft, a Yakovlev Yak-3, crashed into Mount Snežnik in southwestern Slovenia because of poor visibility in dense fog.

Today, the Ajdovščina Flying Club is named after Josip Križaj, and there is a monument to him at Portorož Airport.

== Sources ==
- Stanonik, Tončka, Brenk, Lan: Osebnostiː veliki slovenski biografski leksikon, Mladinska knjiga, Ljubljana, 2008 COBISS 241136128
- Kladnik, Darinka: Zgodovina letalstva na Slovenskem, ZIP - Zavod za intelektualno produkcijo, Ljubljana, 2008 COBISS 242534912 ISBN 978-961-91035-6-2
- Emiliani, Angelo: Italiani Nell'Aviazione Repubblicana Spagnola, Edizioni Aeronautiche Italiane S.r.l., 1980.
- Matyáš, Svatopluk: Stíhačky nad Španělskem 1936–1939, Svět křídel, Cheb 1998.
- Polák, T.: Esa meziválečného období - Part II, in Plastic Kits revue, no. 44, 1995.
- Žirochov, Michail: "Krasnyj" italjanec, Aviacija i vremja, no. 2, 2003.
