= Branka Jurca =

Slovene writer

- Born: 24 May 1914; Kopriva, Austria-Hungary (now in Slovenia)
- Died: 6 March 1999 (aged 84); Ljubljana, Slovenia
- Occupations: Writer, teacher and editor
- Writing career
- Notable works: Ko zorijo jagode, Okoli in okoli, Vohljači in prepovedane skrivnosti
- Notable awards: Levstik Award; 1960 for Okoli in okoli Levstik Award; 1966 for Vohljači in prepovedane skrivnosti

Branka Jurca (24 May 1914 – 6 March 1999) was a Slovene writer, principally for children and young adults.

Jurca was born in Kopriva in the Karst region of what is now Slovenia in 1914. After the First World War the family moved to Maribor where she grew up. She worked as a teacher until the outbreak of the Second World War when she moved to Ljubljana. She participated in the Slovene Liberation Front but was arrested and sent to Gonars concentration camp and then Ravensbrück concentration camp. After the end of the war she worked as teacher for a while and then as an editor of the children's journal Ciciban. She wrote 35 stories for children, novels and collections of short stories. She died in Ljubljana in 1999.

She won the Levstik Award twice, in 1960 for Okoli in okoli (Round and Round) and in 1966 for Vohljači in prepovedane skrivnosti (The Snoopers and Forbidden Secrets).

She was married to the writer and playwright Ivan Potrč and their daughter Marjetica Potrč is an architect.

== Published works ==
Adult Prose

- Pod bičem (podobe iz taborišč) (Under the Whip (Images from Concentration Camps), 1945
- ... potem je zmagalo življenje (... Then Life Won), 1953
- Stekleni grad (The Glass Castle), 1958

For Children and Young Adults

- V pasti, 1955
- Bratec in sestrica, 1956
- Poredni zajček, 1958
- Okoli in okoli, 1960
- Hišnikov dan
- Hišica ob morju, 1962
- Lizike za vse, 1962
- Uhač in njegova druščina, 1963
- Gregec Kobilica, 1965
- Miško Poleno in njegov ognjeni krst, 1965
- Vohljači in prepovedane skrivnosti, 1966
- Beli konjič, 1967
- Do zvezd, 1967
- Žrebiček brez potnega lista, 1969
- Rdeči škorenjčki, 1970
- Katka, stoj!, 1972
- Rodiš se samo enkrat, 1972
- Čuj in Katka, 1974
- Ko zorijo jagode, 1974
- Špelin dnevnik, 1976
- Babičina pravljica, 1977
- Javka v starem čevlju, 1977
- Pionirka sem! Pionir sem!, 1977
- Moj oče partizan, 1978
- S helikopterjem k stricu Tintinu, 1978
- Ko Nina spi, 1980
- Prgišče zvezd, 1980
- Marjanka vseznalka, 1980
- Čudovita stenska ura, 1981
- Anča Pomaranča, 1983
- Snežaki v vrtcu, 1983
- Miško Poleno, 1984
- Pot okoli sveta, 1985
- Modra kapica in začarani volk, 1986
- Kdaj so bili partizani veseli, 1986
- Dobra volja je najbolja, 1987
- 1:0 za zajce, 1990
- Vesele novice z Zelenice, 1993
- V dedovi grapi, 1994
