= Kopriva, Sežana =

Kopriva
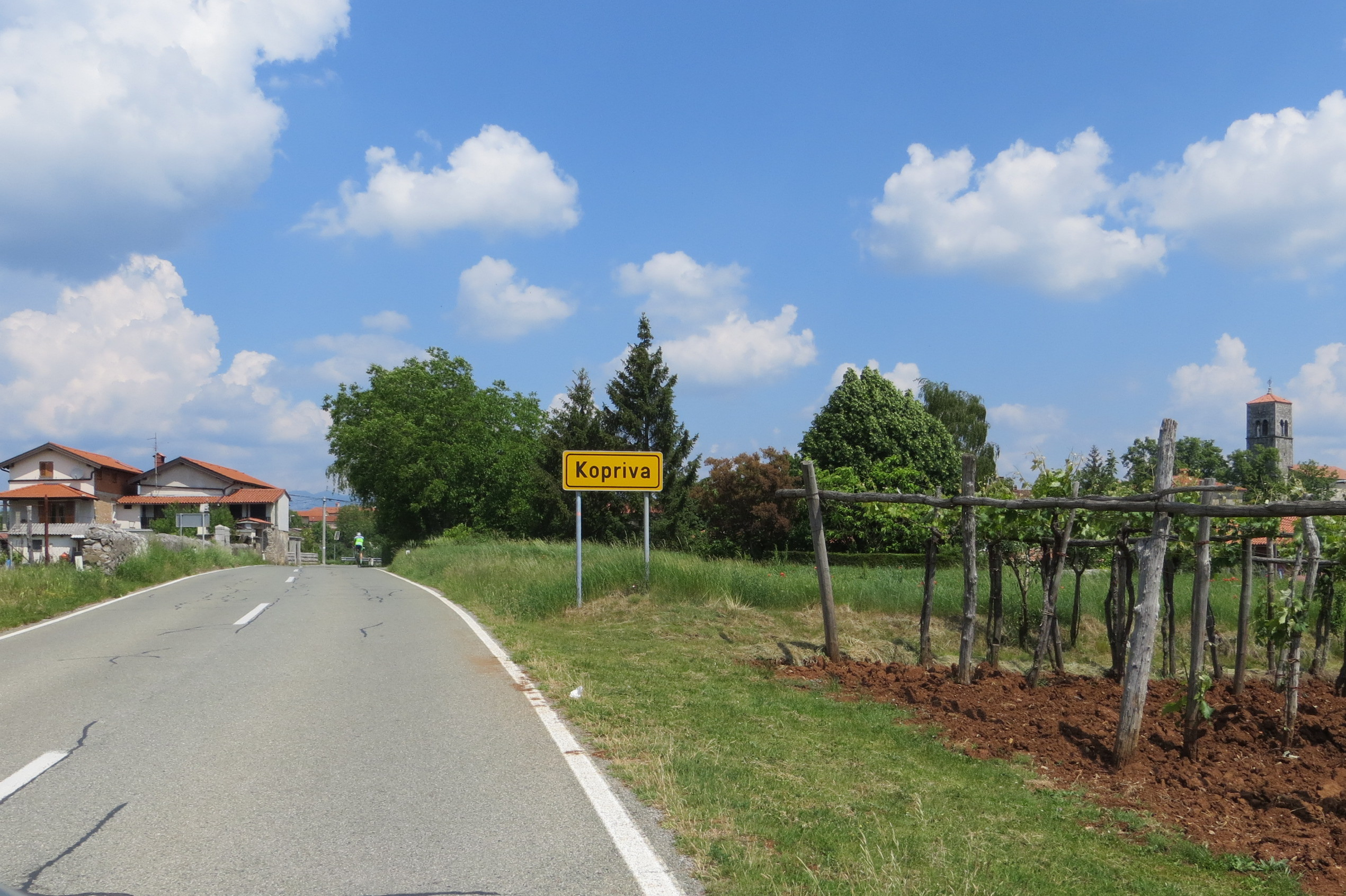

- Location in Slovenia
- Coordinates: 45°46′58.38″N 13°50′1.65″E
- Country: Slovenia
- Traditional region: Littoral
- Statistical region: Coastal–Karst
- Municipality: Sežana

Area
  - Total: 4.44 km^{2} (1.71 sq mi)
- Elevation: 283 m (928 ft)

Population (2002)
  - Total: 168

Kopriva (pronounced [kɔˈpɾiːʋa]) is a village in the Municipality of Sežana in the Littoral region of Slovenia.

== Church ==
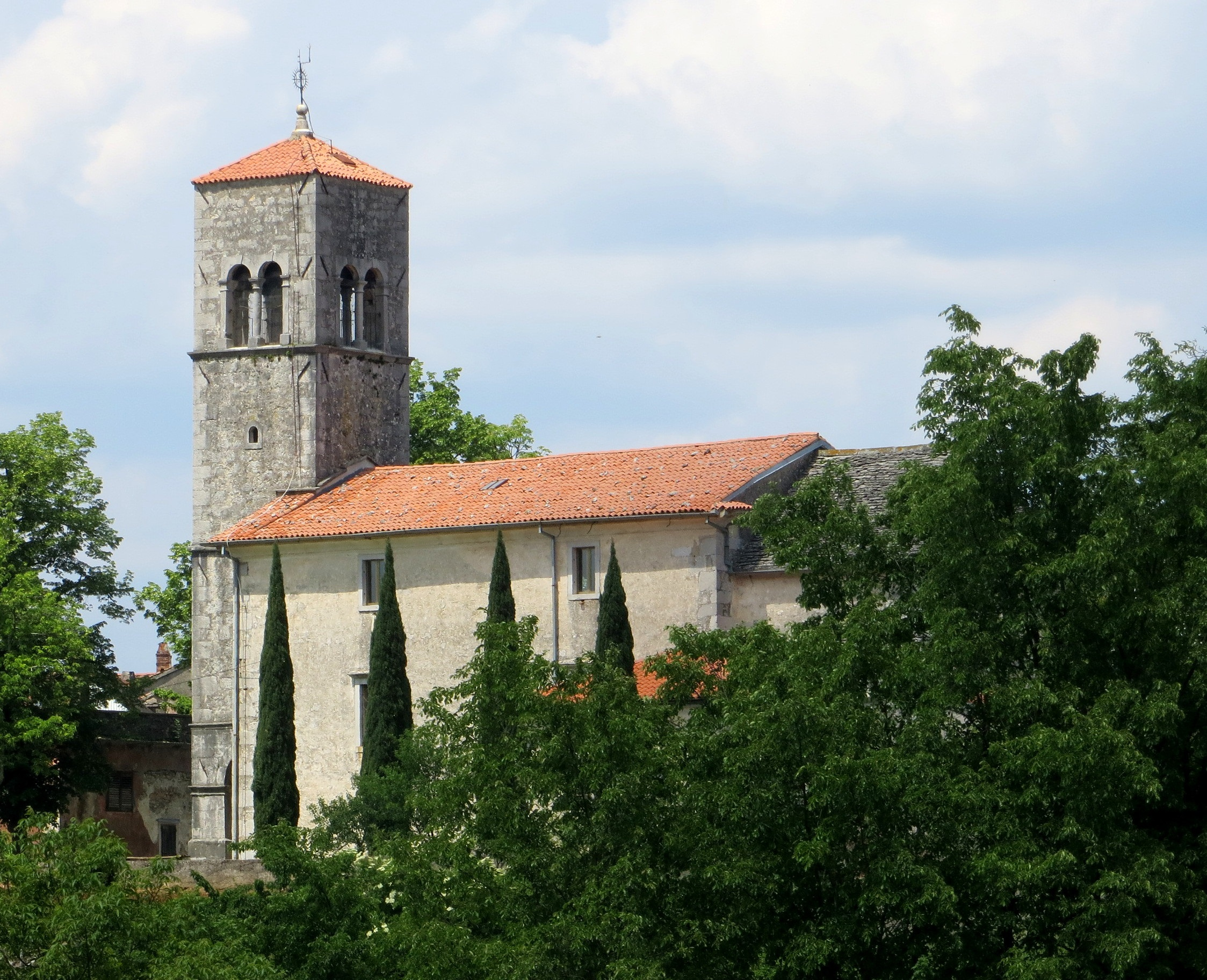
View from the east

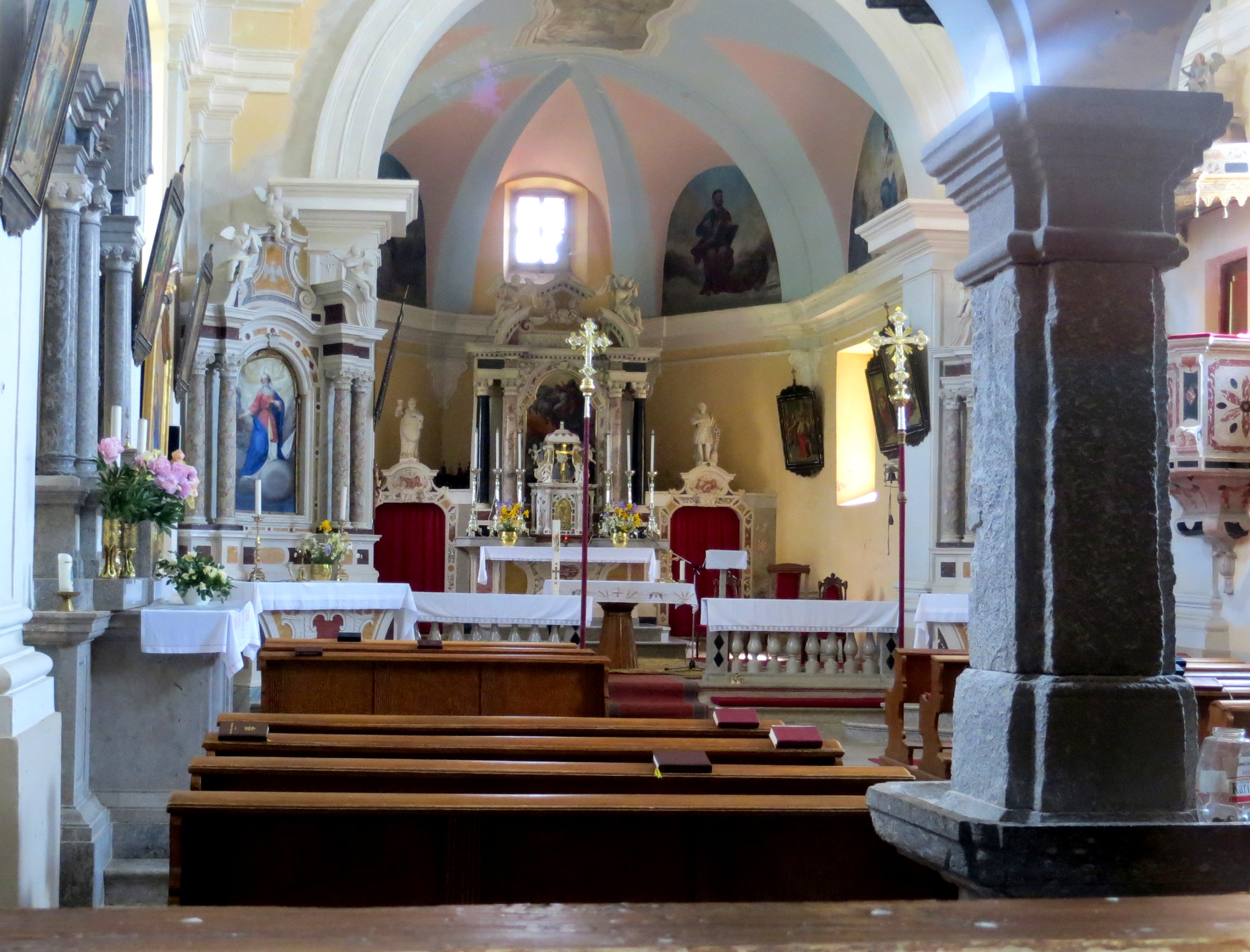
Interior

Prophet Elijah's Church

The parish church in the settlement is dedicated to the Prophet Elijah and belongs to the Diocese of Koper.

== Notable people ==
Notable people that were born or lived in Kopriva include:

- Josip Križaj (1911–1948), military pilot
- Branka Jurca (1914–1999), author
