= Ayşe Erkmen =

Turkish sculptor (born 1949)

- Born: 1949 (age 76–77)

Ayşe Erkmen (born 1949, Istanbul) is a visual artist recognized as "one of the foremost Turkish artists." She is living and working in Berlin and in Istanbul.

Influenced by specific sites, histories and geographies Ayşe Erkmen's works takes the social and physical environment that she is in. Erkmen does not invent new forms, but she transforms architectural and social conditions and contexts. Between 1998 and 1999 she worked as the Arnold Bode Professor at Kassel Art Academy, and between 2000 and 2015 she was a lecturer at Kunstakademie Münster. Since 2012 Erkmen is a member of the Akademie der Künste, Berlin.

In 2011 Erkmen represented Turkey with her work titled Plan B, at the 54th International Art Exhibition, Venice Biennale. In 2002, she received the Maria Sibylla Merian Prize of the Ministry for Science and Art of the Hesse state government.

== Education ==
Ayşe Erkmen was born in Istanbul, Turkey in 1949. She graduated from Academy of Fine Arts, Istanbul, Department of Sculpture in 1977 where she studied in Sadi Çalık studio. In 1993, she participated in the DAAD International Artist Residency Programme in Berlin.

== Works ==
"I take everyday objects, or more often situations, which I already see as artworks/sculptures, and I work them into artworks that are freed from these starting points. There is a long process of working through to reduce and change the direction. The tension may come from the result of this switch of context or the effort to balance the form and function while creating the work."

Since 1977 Ayşe Erkmen "has worked with rooms, walls, floors, ceilings, windows, doors, basements, building facades, roofs, overhead lights, a skylight and an elevator, among others." Erkmen's research based projects include physical structures but also their use, history, cultural and political connotations. She does not introduce new elements or forms but transforms what is already in the site or in the space.

"Venice is a unique location. It is all about water. Coming from another city that is also very much about water, it has an unavoidable fascination for me. It has somehow always been a leitmotif in my work. But I still think I am able to look at water beyond clichés and romanticism because it is an element, in all its layers of meanings. It is a topic I am familiar with and which has always been a part of my life."

In 2011 Erkmen represented Turkey with her work titled Plan B, at the 54th International Art Exhibition, Venice Biennale. Composed of connected colored pipes, Plan B, "draws on the ineluctable and complex relationship Venice has with water. Her project transforms a room inside the Arsenale into a complex water purification unit where machines perform as sculptures, encompassing the audience inside of the filtration process which eventually provides clean, drinkable water back to the canal."

For her work On Water at Skulptur Projekte Münster 2017, Erkmen selected inland harbour as her location. She built an underwater bridge, just below the surface, made of ocean cargo containers, steel beams, and steel grates. On Water "created the impression that visitors are walking on water. In that sense, they became visible actors on Erkmen’s stage. In addition, the artist pointed out problems of a sociological and city-planning nature: How are borders drawn on maps, and how is sociocultural access achieved on the drawing board? How can existing hurdles be overcome, both physically and metaphorically?"

== Exhibitions ==
Erkmen has participated in Skulptur Projekte Münster 1997 and 2017, the 2nd, 3rd and 13th Istanbul Biennials; The Pavilion of Turkey at the 54th Venice Biennale; Manifesta 1, 12th Shanghai, 2nd Berlin, 3rd Gwangju, 9th Sharjah, and Scape 2008, 2008 Folkestone Triennial and 3rd Echigo Tsunami Triennial.

Her work was exhibited in institutions and museums such as Akademie der Künste (Berlin), Arter (Istanbul), Auckland Art Space, The Contemporary Austin, Barbican Centre (London), Bonniers Konsthall (Stockholm), Centre Pompidou (Paris), Hamburger Bahnhof–Museum für Gegenwart–Berlin, Hamburger Kunsthalle, Istanbul Modern, Saidaiji Temple (Nara), SALT (Istanbul), SMAK (Gent) and Tanas (Berlin).
