= Thomas Hörl (artist) =

Austrian artist

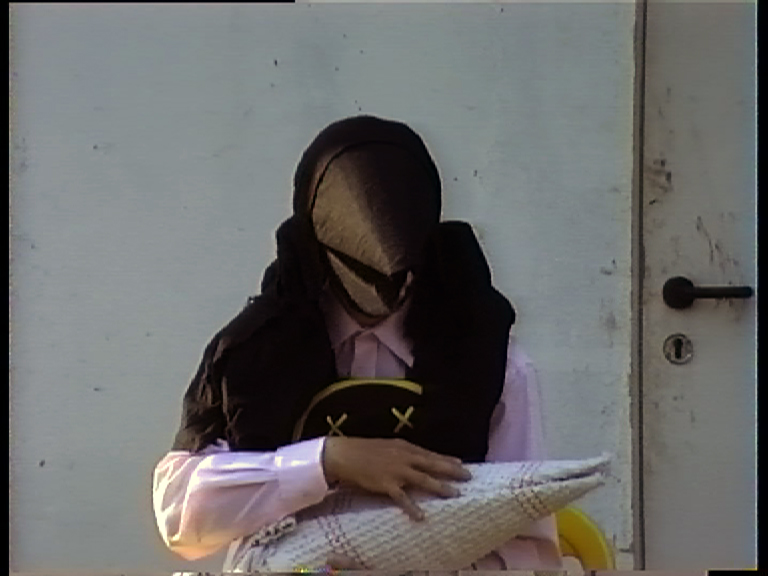
UNNESKO II The Beak Lady Videostill Thomas Hoerl 2013

Thomas Hörl (born October 17, 1975) is a visual artist.

== Early life ==
Hörl spent his childhood and youth in Golling an der Salzach and Salzburg. Hörl currently lives and works in Vienna, where he rents a studio in the sculpture buildings of the federal government in the former 1873 world expo pavilions. He studied art at Academy of Fine Arts Vienna, at Iceland University of the Arts Reykjavík and Tokyo Zokei University. Before his art studies he was trained as a chef and visited a school for sculpture.

== Work ==
=== Artistic focus and cooperation ===
He works solo as well as in various collaborations (Gin Müller, Sir Meisi, Michikazu Matsune, Jakob Lena Knebl, Sodom Vienna) and from 2003 to 2020 in the artist group kozek hörlonski together with Peter Kozek. In the year 2020, however, the two have appeared in their collaborations under their civil names and have dispensed with a group name.

Hörl's artistic focus is on researching regional customs and traditions. The artist transfers folkloric contents and forms into new contexts. Using the collage technique as well as reenactment, extensive installations are created. His artistic work includes performances, video works, objects, collage, and staged photography, and recently film projects are increasingly appearing in his diverse oeuvre. As part of Artist-in-residence programs or self-organized work residencies, he has been active in Berlin, Frankfurt am Main, Tokyo, Paris, London, Vilnius, Tallinn, Tirana, Timișoara, Warsaw and Reykjavík. Hörl exhibited mainly in Austria but also in Germany, Japan, UK, Estonia and in the USA.

File:F.W.M.Symphonie 1.70.1.png|thumb|Filmstill from the movie F.W.M. Symphony, starring Vito Baumüller.

=== Film projects ===
In 2017–2019, Hörl collaborated with Peter Kozek and Alexander Martinz on the film trilogy Demonic Screens which was screened at Steirischer Herbst 2018, Reaktor Vienna 2019 and Diagonale - Festival of Austrian Film Graz 2020, among others. The latest film LICHTHÖHE from 2021 was made together with Peter Kozek and Victor Jaschke for the art project SERPENTINE - a touch of heaven (and hell) curated and organized by Michael Zinganel along the Grossglockner High Alpine Road and was shown in a "non-stop container cinema" and is distributed by sixpackfilm. From 2021 he worked on a silent film project, F.W.M. Symphony, about the disappearance of F.W. Murnau's head from its burial place. The featurette movie premiered in the US at 19th Another Hole in the Head Film Festival in late 2022 and in spring 2023 in Europe at III. Pápa International Historical Film Festival (Hungary). Both festivals honored the film with awards.

=== Awards and monographs ===
Together with Peter Kozek, he was awarded the Prize for Visual Arts 2021 by the City of Vienna for their joint work.

In 2022 a monograph on his solo art work to date entitled Curtain Walls & Rautenballett has been published by Verlag für moderne Kunst. In 2022 the artist was shortlisted for the Grand Art Prize of the Province of Salzburg. In 2024 Hörl created a portrait gallery about Austrian Perchten figures which has been widely installed at Joanneums Neue Galerie vestibule, commissioned by Steirischer Herbst '24.

== Selected exhibitions, festivals, etc. ==
=== Soloshows ===
- Castle Museum of Golling (2023)
- Kunstraum Pro Arte, Hallein (2022)
- Kulturdrogerie Vienna (2020)
- Salzburg Museum (2018)
- Zeta Gallery, Tirana (2016)
- Austrian Museum of Folk Life and Folk Art, Vienna (2016/17)
- Dwarf Gallery, Reykjavík (2012)

=== Group shows ===
- Neue Galerie Graz (2024/25)
- EKO9 Triennial of Art and Environment, Maribor (2024)
- Soho Studios, Vienna (2023)
- Museum of applied Arts Vienna (2022)
- Centrum Berlin (2017)
- Museum Villa Rot (2014/15)
- ACF London (2013)
- mumok Vienna (2004)

=== Festival participation ===
- Wien Modern (2022)
- Tanzquartier Wien – Centre for Contemporary Choreography and Performance Vienna (2022)
- Diagonale (2020)
- Steirischer Herbst, Graz (2018)
- Internationale Schillertage, Mannheim (2011)

== Discography ==
- 7″ Vinyl: Thomas Hörl. Matthias, Wiener Phonogrammarchiv with remixes by Cherry Sunkist and das_em, documentation of the exhibition Matthias, text, poster; Thomas Hörl, ed. (Vienna / Salzburg 2015)
- 10″ Vinyl: pastforward – 100 Jahre Kunstverein Baden, 100 years anniversary edition, text, gatefoldcover, kozek hörlonski, Thomas Hörl, Peter Kozek, Kunstverein Baden, ed. (Vienna / Baden 2016)
