= Thomas Schütte =

German artist (born 1954)

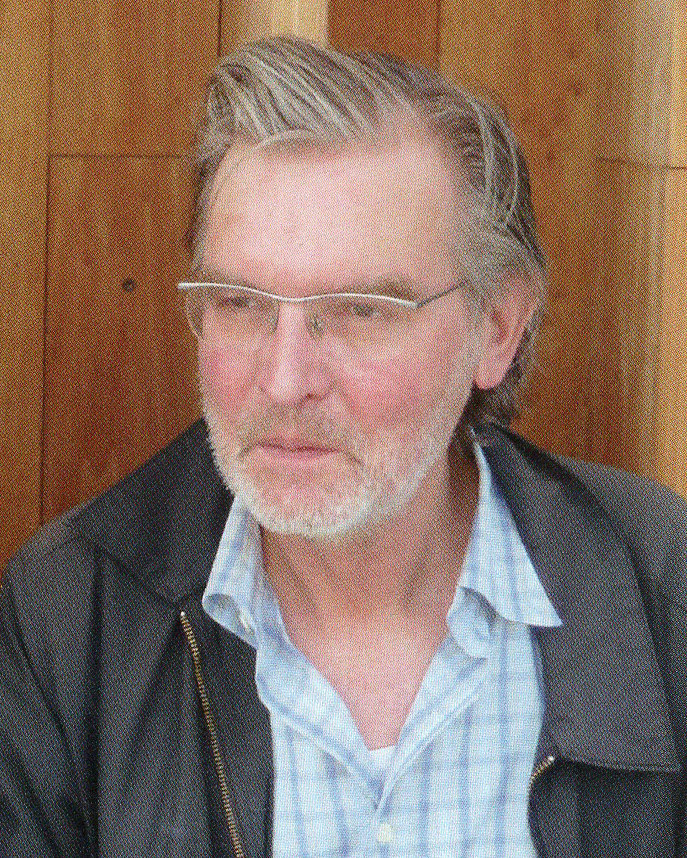
- Thomas Schütte
- Born: 16 November 1954 (age 71); Oldenburg, West Germany
- Education: Kunstakademie Düsseldorf
- Known for: Sculpture, architectural design
- Website: Official website

Thomas Schütte (born 16 November 1954) is a German contemporary artist. He sculpts, creates architectural designs, and draws. He lives and works in Düsseldorf.

== Education ==
From 1973 to 1981, Schütte studied art at the Kunstakademie Düsseldorf, alongside Katharina Fritsch, under Gerhard Richter, Fritz Schwegler, Daniel Buren and Benjamin Buchloh.

== Exhibitions ==
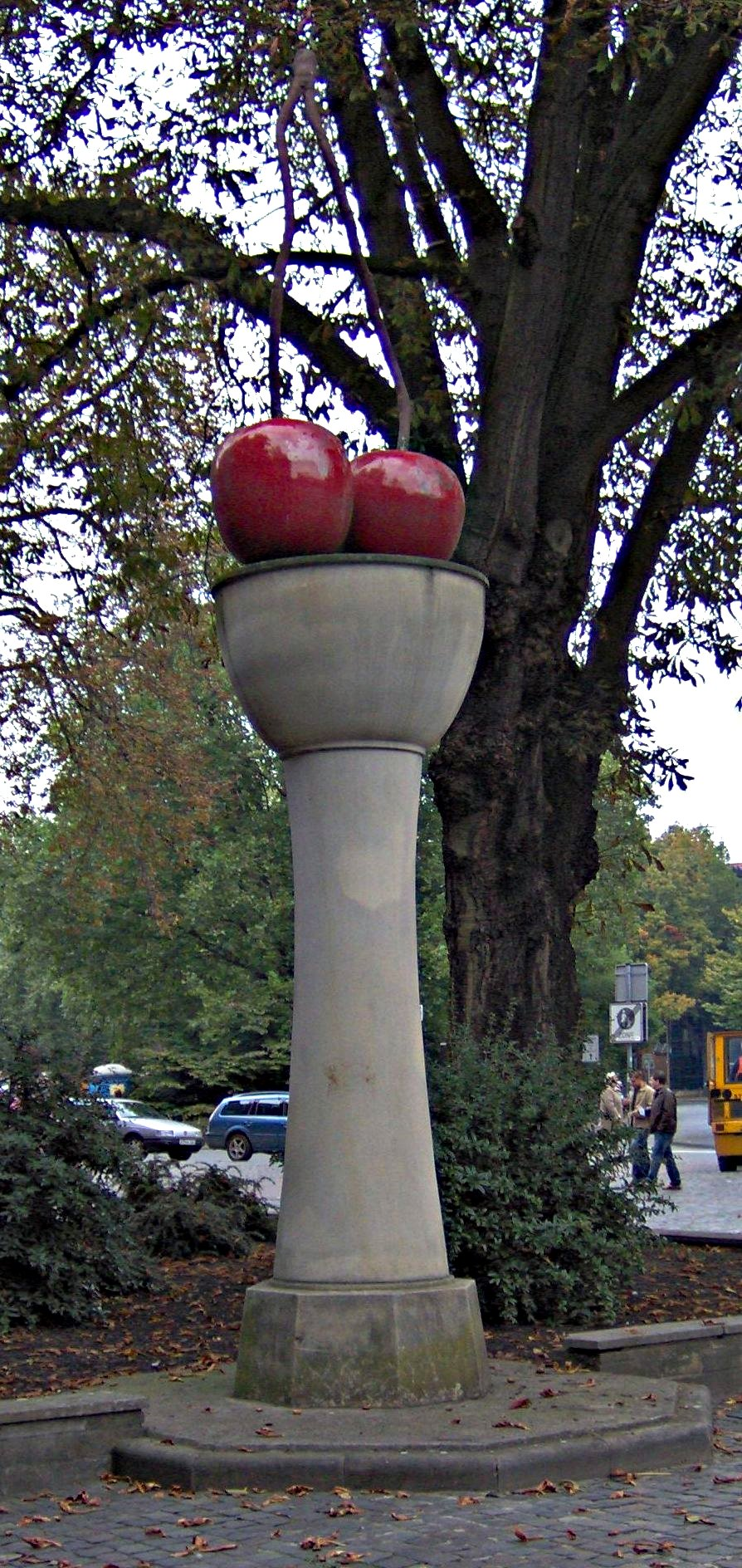
Kirschensäule (Cherry Column) at Skulptur Projekte Münster

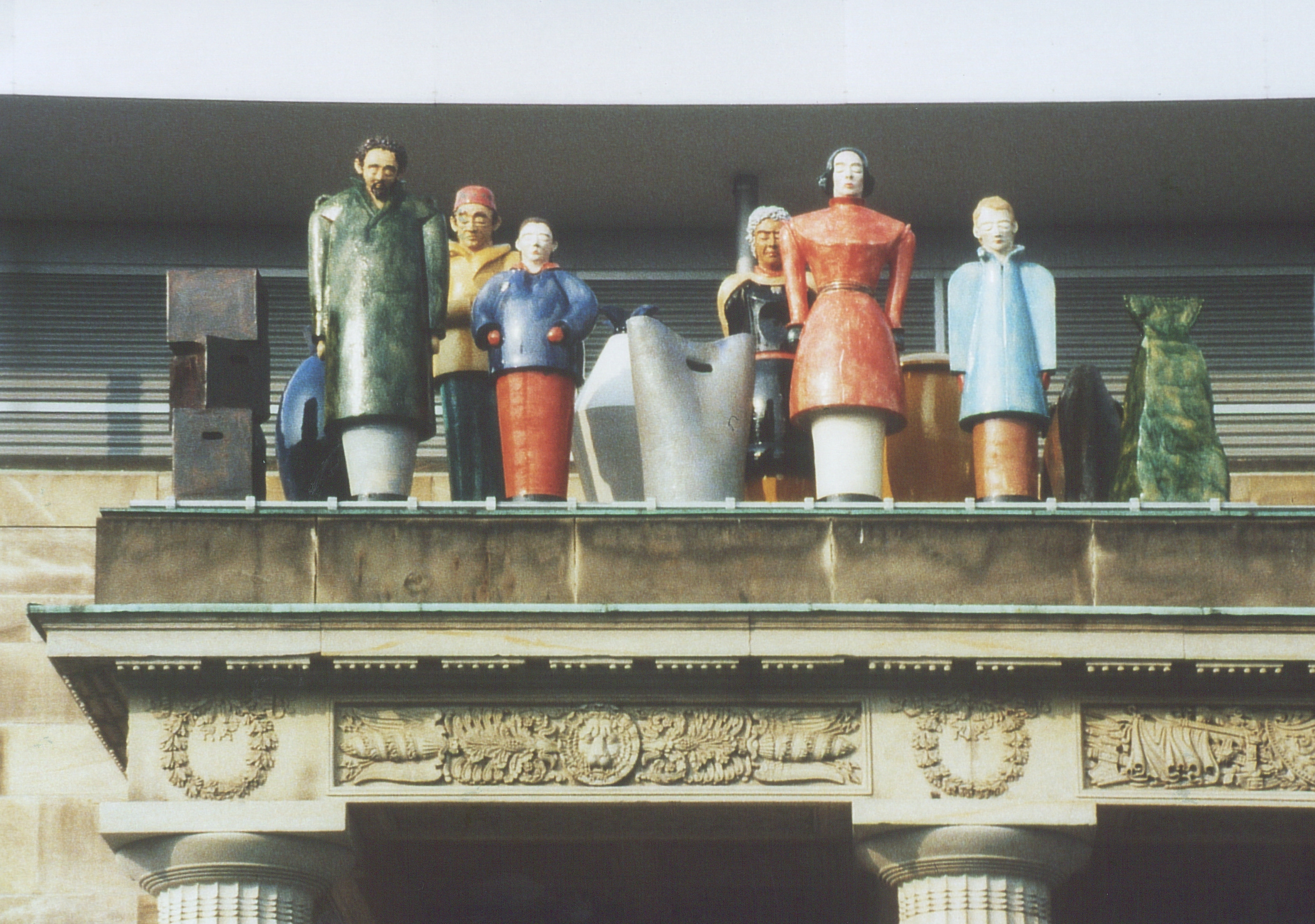
Die Fremden (The Strangers) for documenta IX

Schütte had his first US solo show in New York at Marian Goodman Gallery in 1989.

In 2007 he created Model for a Hotel, an architectural model of a 21-storey building made from horizontal panes of yellow, blue and red glass and weighing more than eight tonnes, for the Fourth plinth of Trafalgar Square.

Schütte had one-man shows at venues including the Serpentine Galleries, London (2012); Kunstmuseum Winterthur, Winterthur, Switzerland (2003) (later travelled to the Museum of Grenoble and K21, Kunstsammlung Nordrhein-Westfalen, Düsseldorf); Folkwang Museum, Essen (2002); Sammlung Goetz, Munich (2001); a survey in three parts at Dia Art Foundation, New York (1998-2000); Serralves Foundation, Portugal (1998); De Pont Foundation, Tilburg (1998); Kunsthalle, Hamburg (1994); ARC Musée d'Art Moderne de la Ville de Paris (1990); as well as the Stedelijk Museum Amsterdam, Eindhoven (1990). His monumental sculpture "Vater Staat" was displayed at Kunsthalle Mainz, Germany in 2013.

Schütte participated in documenta in Kassel three times; in 2005, he was awarded the Golden Lion for Best Artist at the Venice Biennial.

Multiple of Thomas Schütte's work were featured in a retrospective exhibition on the entirety of the 6th floor of the MoMA from September 29, 2024-January 18, 2025. The works featured are installations of both his statues as well as his work with oil and watercolor, spanning from his early work of self-portraits while studying under Gerhard Richter in 1975 to his more contemporary work in 2012 with Krieger (2012).

== Recognition ==
Schütte has received numerous awards, including the Kurt Schwitters Preis für Bildende Kunst der Niedersächsischen Sparkassenstiftung, 1998, and the Kunstpreis der Stadt Wolfsburg, Germany, 1996. In 2005, he was awarded the Golden Lion at the Venice Biennale for his work in María de Corral's exhibition "The Experience of Art". He was awarded the Düsseldorf Prize in 2010, previously given to Bruce Nauman, Marlene Dumas, and Rosemarie Trockel.

== Art market ==
His best selling sculpture in the art market is Großer Geist Nr. 6 (Great Spirit Nº 6) (1996), a bronze figure with green patina, who fetched $5,317,000 at Christie's New York on 12 May 2014. The previous record was held by a cast aluminum sculpture, Großer Geist No. 16 (Great Spirit Nº 16) (2002), an eight-foot-tall sculpture of a ghostly figure, who sold for $4.1 million at Phillips on 8 November 2010.

== Public collections ==
Schütte's work is held in many art museums across the world, including the Tate, the Clark Art Institute, MoMA, the Berggruen Museum, and the Art Institute of Chicago.
