= Goran Tomcic =

Artist

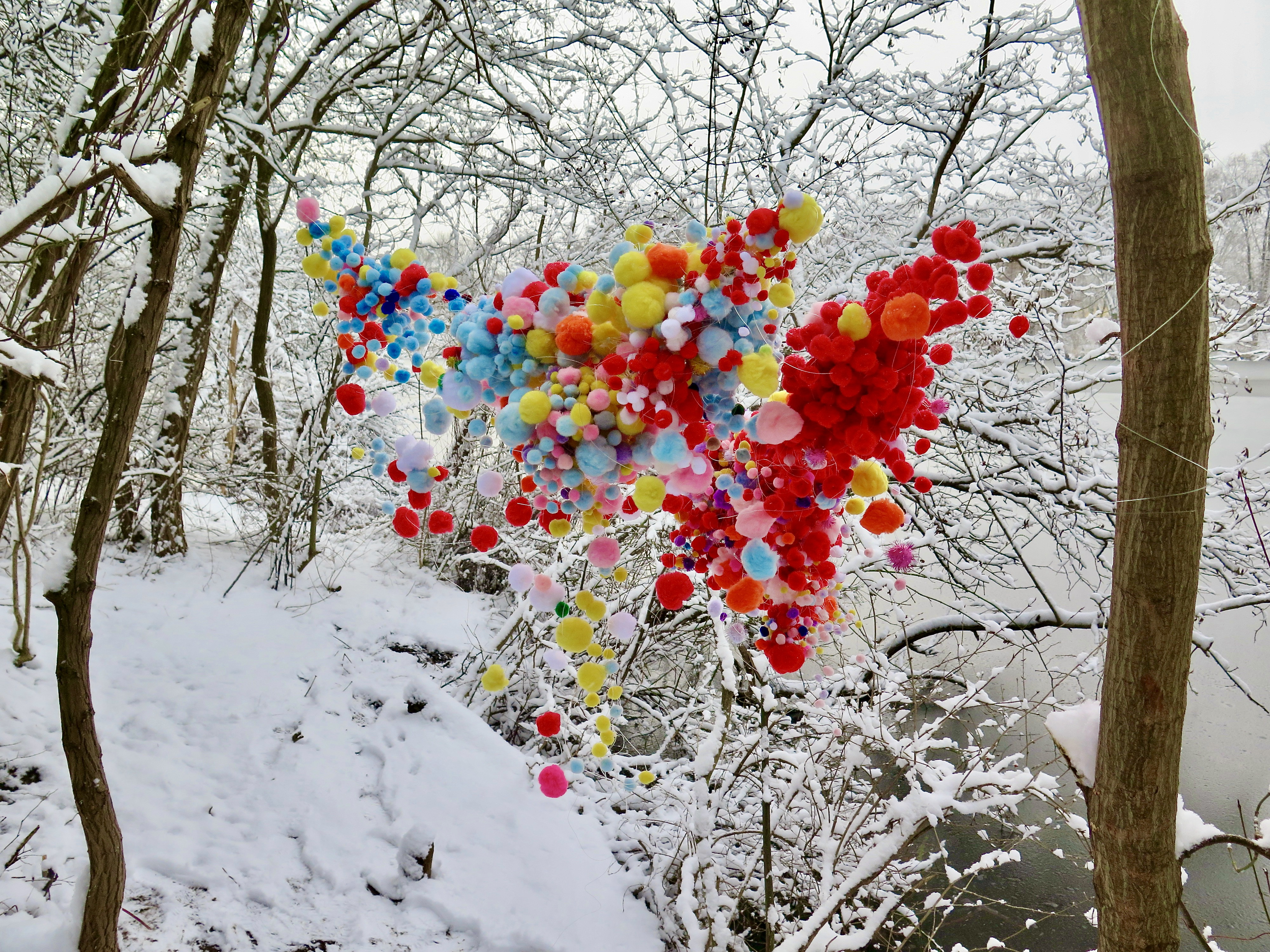

Goran Tomcic (b. 1964) is an artist based in Berlin, Germany. His diverse artistic styles and subjects include site-specific installations, temporary structures, text-art, and performative and participatory practices.

== Biography ==
Tomcic grew up on Hvar Island and in the city of Split, Croatia. He studied Art History and Comparative Literature at the University of Zagreb. He was based in New York City and Miami in the US from 1991 to 2009 before relocating to Germany. In 1996 he graduated with an MA in Curatorial Studies from the Center for Curatorial Studies, Bard College. From 1997 to 1999, he was the director of Wolfson Galleries at Miami Dade College.

Tomcic has been the recipient of numerous grants and fellowships, including the Trust for Mutual Understanding (1994), the Pollock-Krasner Grant (2007), the MacDowell Residency Fellowship (1992, 1996), the Berlin Senate Department for Culture and Europe (2020), and he has been artist-in-residence at many artists residencies.

== Work ==
Tomcic's large-scale installations and projects have been exhibited in museums, galleries and alternative spaces worldwide. His work appears in many collections, including:

- Kunstmuseum Wolfsburg (Germany)
- KRC Collection (the Netherlands)
- CitizenM Hotels
- Haifa Museum of Art (Israel)
- Museum of Modern and Contemporary Art, Rijeka (Croatia)
- Valamar Riviera Collection (Croatia)
- Lapidarium Museum Novigrad (Croatia)
- Royal Caribbean International (USA)

Since 2015 his artistic practice has been focused on participatory art practices. The Pompom Nets project is an ongoing, interdisciplinary, process-based art project and a social experiment. The project creates temporary situations and new ways of being associated. As the main part of this project, the artist has been collaborating with the public, involving diverse communities and various artistic mediums in exhibiting spatial, site-specific installations all over the world.
