= Ivan Potrč =

Slovene writer and playwright

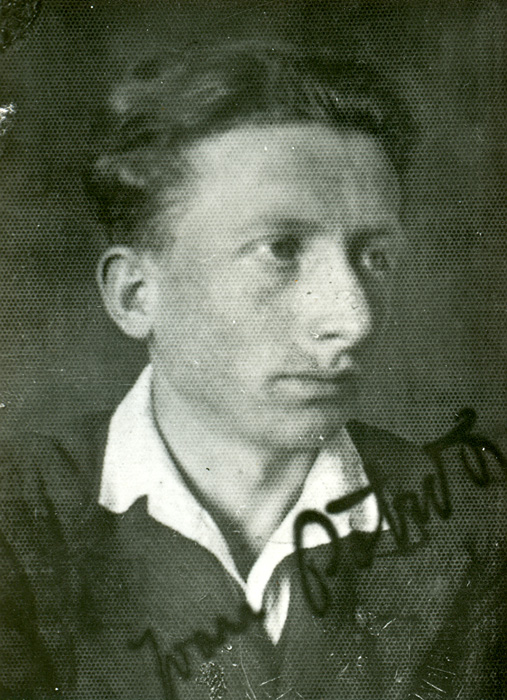
Ivan Potrč (1913–1993)

Ivan Potrč (January 1, 1913 – June 12, 1993) was a Slovene writer and playwright.

== Biography ==
Ivan Potrč was born on January 1, 1913, in a poor peasant family in Štuki near Ptuj, in what was then the Duchy of Styria in the Austro-Hungarian Empire. As a teenager living in difficult social circumstances and in the time of the rise of German nationalism, which was seen a threat to the northern regions of the Kingdom of Yugoslavia, he became an enthusiastic communist. Due to his political activities he was sentenced to eleven months of prison and excluded from the high school even before he passed his final exit exam. From 1938 to 1941, he was employed as a journalist at the national liberal daily newspaper Večernik in Maribor. In 1941, after the Nazis invaded Yugoslavia and annexed northern Slovenia to the German Reich, Portč was interned at the Mauthausen concentration camp, from where he returned in 1943 and joined the Yugoslav Partisans. During and after World War II he worked as editor and journalist for the newspapers Domovina, Borba, and Ljudska pravica. In 1947, he became the main editor and later the director of the Mladinska knjiga publishing company.

== Work ==
Ivan Potrč was the pioneer of social realism in the northeastern Slovenia. He was influenced by his social environment and his avant-garde political ideas to which he remained faithful all his life. His most influential works were the drama trilogy depicting the disintegration and the downfall of Krefels, a landowner family, and the novel Na kmetih (The Land and the Flesh), which has been translated to numerous languages.

For his work, Potrč received two Prešeren Awards. In 1947, he was awarded for his play Kreflova kmetija (The Krefel Farm), and in 1955, for his novel Na kmetih. From 1977 until 1983, he was an associate member of the Slovenian Academy of Sciences and Arts, and from 1983 until his death a full member of the academy.

He was married to the author Branka Jurca. Their daughter Marjetica Potrč is an artist and architect.
