= Andreas Siekmann =

German artist and art historian

- Born: 1961; Hamm, Germany
- Education: BA LMU Munich; PhD Kunstakademie Dusseldorf
- Known for: Art History, Drawing, Installation art, Institutional critique

Andreas Siekmann (born 1961, Hamm, Germany) is visual artist and art historian living between Berlin and Buenos Aires, who works on text, drawing, and public projects often in collaboration with artist Alice Creischer. Siekmann studied art history at LMU Munich and holds a PhD in Art from the Kunstakademie Düsseldorf Art School, Germany.

== Work and career ==
Andreas Siekmann's work revolves around social commentary and critic against capitalist economic forces within the arts in relation to corporations and public services. For instance, In the Stomach of the Predators, Siekamann and Alice Creischer work as a duo to analyze the state of global economic, political, and cultural forces and their impacts on the environment.

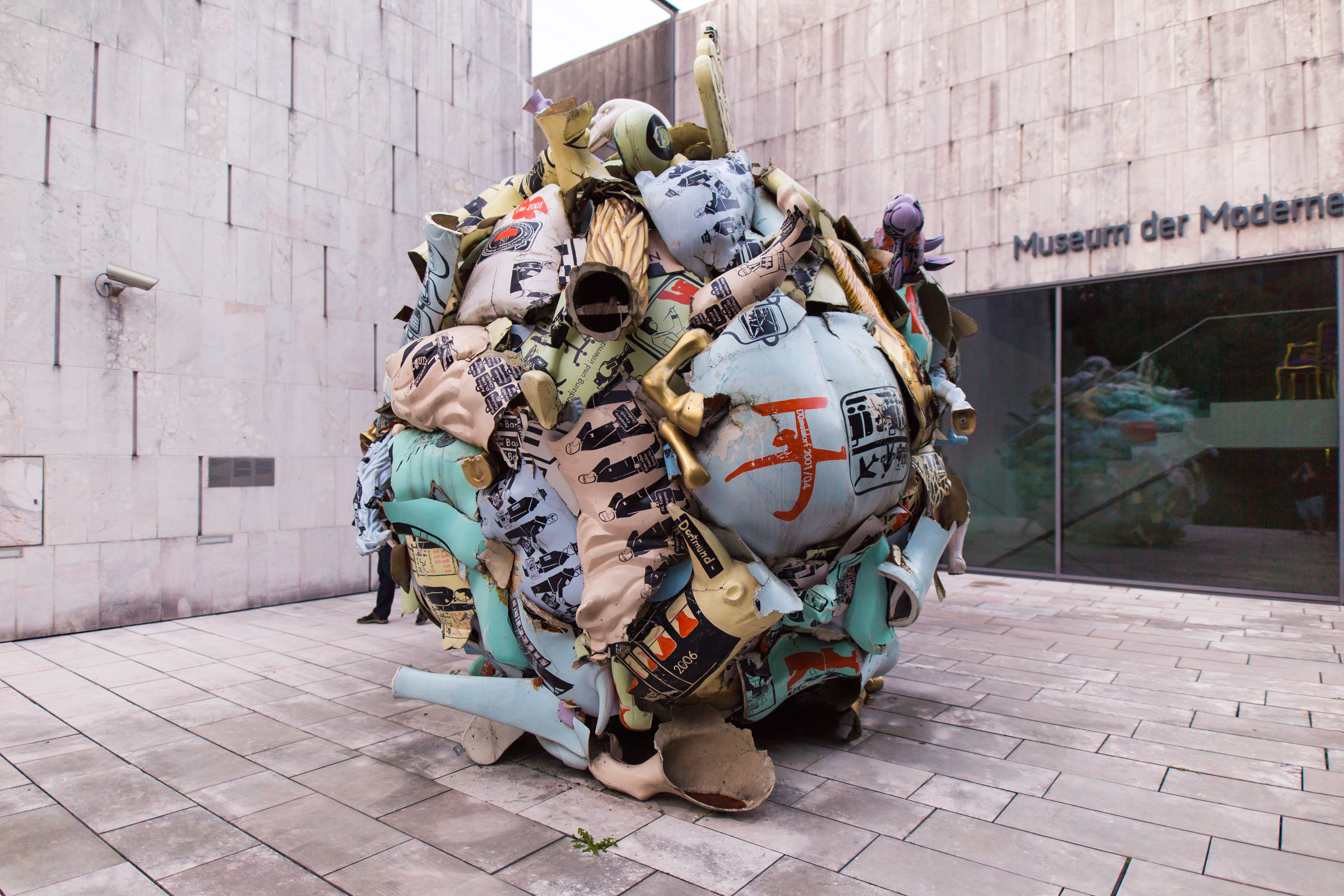
Andreas Siekmann, Trickle Down 3. Installation view

His work has been included in international art exhibitions and festivals such as Documenta 12 (2007) and Documenta 11 (2002), in Kassel; Venice Biennale, Italy; The School of Kyiv 2015, Ukraine; and Skulptur Projekte Münster 2007, Germany; among others.

=== Collections ===
Siekmann's work is included in international museum collections such as the Pérez Art Museum Miami, Florida; the Museum of Modern Art, New York; and the Museum of Contemporary Art Barcelona, Spain; the Museo Nacional Centro de Arte Reina Sofia, Spain, among others.
