= Alice Creischer =

German artist, writer and theorist

Alice Creischer (1960 in Gerolstein) is a German artist, writer and theorist. Her artistic practice and theoretical work focuses on issues of economic and institutional critique, globalization and the history of capitalism.

== Life ==
Alice Creischer studied philosophy and German literature at University of Düsseldorf and Visual Arts at Kunstakademie Düsseldorf, where she was a master student of Fritz Schwegler. She co-curated a number of influential exhibitions, such as Messe 2ok (1995) and ExArgentina (2004). Together with Andreas Siekmann and Max Jorge Hinderer she curated the exhibition The Potosí Principle – How can we sing the song of the Lord in an alien land? at the Museo Reina Sofía in Madrid, which toured to Haus der Kulturen der Welt, Berlin (2010), Museo nacional de arte, La Paz (2011) and Museo Nacional de Etnografía y Folklore, La Paz (2011). Since 2014, she is together with Andreas Siekmann professor for Spatial Strategies at Kunsthochschule Weißensee in Berlin.

== Selected exhibitions ==
=== Solo shows ===
- 2019: His Master's Voice, KOW Gallery Berlin
- 2016: It is March 24 in the year 2000 which is compelling to be prospective, Culture Gest, Lisbon
- 2014: In The Stomach Of The Predators, KOW Gallery Berlin
- 2008: Alice Creischer. Apparatus for the Osmotic Compensation of the Pressure of Wealth during the Contemplation of Poverty, MACBA, Barcelona.

=== Group shows ===
- 2016 Jerusalem Show – Al Ma'mal Foundation for Contemporary Art
- 2015 school of Kyiv, Biennial
- 2012 Social Fabric

== Selected writings ==
- Alice Creischer, Andreas Siekmann: Universalism in Art and the Art of Universalism. Thoughts on the »globalization« of the art system, taking the United Arab Emirates as example. In: Springerin
- Colectivo Situationes & Alice Creischer, Andreas Siekmann: Figures of the Crisis. An exchange of letters between the Colectivo Situaciones and Alice Creischer / Andreas Siekmann on forms of politicization in the present Argentine and German context. In: Springerin
- Alice Creischer, Andreas Siekmann: Where and Why You Shouldn’t Read Any Further. On Michel Foucault’s Lecture on January 21, 1976, at the Collège de France. In: Springerin
