= List of cities, towns, and villages in Slovenia: T =

This is a list of cities, towns, and villages in Slovenia, starting with T.

Settlement	Municipality
Tabor nad Knežakom	Pivka
Tabor	Nova Gorica
Tabor	Sežana
Tabor	Tabor
Tajhte	Šentjur
Talčji Vrh	Črnomelj
Tanča Gora	Črnomelj
Tatinec	Kranj
Tatre	Hrpelje-Kozina
Tavžlje	Cerknica
Teharje	Celje
Tehovec	Medvode
Tekačevo	Rogaška Slatina
Telče	Sevnica
Telčice	Sevnica
Temenica	Ivančna Gorica
Temljine	Tolmin
Temnica	Miren-Kostanjevica
Tenetiše	Kranj
Tenetiše	Litija
Tepanje	Slovenske Konjice
Tepanjski Vrh	Slovenske Konjice
Tepe	Litija
Ter	Ljubno
Terbegovci	Sveti Jurij ob Ščavnici
Tešanovci	Moravske Toplice
Tešova	Vransko
Tevče	Ajdovščina
Tevče	Laško
Tibolci	Gorišnica
Tihaboj	Litija
Tinjan	Koper
Tinjska Gora	Slovenska Bistrica
Tirna	Zagorje ob Savi
Tirosek	Gornji Grad
Tisovec	Dobrepolje
Tišenpolj	Kostel
Tišina	Tišina (občina)
Tlaka	Litija
Tlake	Grosuplje
Tlake	Rogatec
Todraž	Gorenja vas-Poljane
Tolčane	Ivančna Gorica
Tolmin	Tolmin
Tolminske Ravne	Tolmin
Tolminski Lom	Tolmin
Tolsti Vrh P. R. na K. - del	Dravograd
Tolsti Vrh P. R. na K. - del	Ravne na Koroškem
Tolsti Vrh pri Mislinji	Mislinja
Tolsti Vrh	Litija
Tolsti Vrh	Slovenske Konjice
Tolsti Vrh	Šentjernej
Tomačevica	Komen
Tomaj	Sežana
Tomaška vas	Slovenj Gradec
Tomaž nad Praprotnem	Škofja Loka
Tomaž nad Vojnikom	Vojnik
Tomažini	Velike Lašče
Tomažja vas	Škocjan
Tominje	Ilirska Bistrica
Tomišelj	Ig
Topla Reber	Kočevje
Topla	Črna na Koroškem
Topol pri Begunjah	Cerknica
Topol pri Medvodah	Medvode
Topol	Bloke
Topolc	Ilirska Bistrica
Topole	Mengeš
Topole	Rogaška Slatina
Topolje	Železniki
Topolovci	Cankova
Topolovec	Koper
Topolovec	Šmarje pri Jelšah
Topolovo	Kozje
Topolšica	Šoštanj
Topovlje	Braslovče
Torka	Železniki
Torovo	Vodice
Toško Čelo	Ljubljana
Tovsto	Laško
Trata pri Velesovem	Cerklje na Gorenjskem
Trata	Semič
Trata	Škofja Loka
Trate	Šentilj
Tratna ob Voglajni	Šentjur
Tratna pri Grobelnem	Šentjur
Trava	Loški Potok
Travna Gora	Sodražica
Travni Dol	Novo mesto
Travnik	Cerkno
Travnik	Loški Potok
Trbinc	Mirna
Trboje	Šenčur
Trbonje	Dravograd
Trbovlje	Trbovlje
Trčova	Maribor
Trdkova	Kuzma
Trdobojci	Videm
Trebanjski Vrh	Trebnje
Trebča vas	Žužemberk
Trebče	Bistrica ob Sotli
Trebelno pri Palovčah	Kamnik
Trebelno	Trebnje
Trebenče	Cerkno
Trebeše	Koper
Trebež	Brežice
Trebež	Ivančna Gorica
Trebija	Gorenja vas-Poljane
Trebižani	Komen
Trebnja Gorica	Ivančna Gorica
Trebnje	Trebnje
Trebnji Vrh	Semič
Tremerje	Celje
Trenta	Bovec
Trgovišče	Ormož
Triban	Koper
Tribej	Dravograd
Tribuče	Črnomelj
Trimlini	Lendava
Trlično	Rogatec
Trnava	Braslovče
Trniče	Starše
Trnjava	Lukovica
Trnje	Črenšovci
Trnje	Pivka
Trnje	Škofja Loka
Trnje	Trebnje
Trno	Šentjur
Trnov Hrib	Laško
Trnovci	Ormož
Trnovče	Lukovica
Trnovec pri Dramljah	Šentjur
Trnovec pri Slovenski Bistrici	Slovenska Bistrica
Trnovec	Kočevje
Trnovec	Medvode
Trnovec	Metlika
Trnovec	Mozirje
Trnovec	Sevnica
Trnovec	Videm
Trnovica	Ivančna Gorica
Trnovlje pri Celju	Celje
Trnovlje pri Socki	Vojnik
Trnovo ob Soči	Kobarid
Trnovo	Laško
Trnovo	Nova Gorica
Trnovska vas	Trnovska vas
Trnovski Vrh	Trnovska vas
Trobelno	Kamnik
Troblje	Slovenj Gradec
Trobni Dol	Laško
Trojane	Lukovica
Trojno	Laško
Tropovci	Tišina (občina)
Troščine	Grosuplje
Trotkova	Benedikt
Trpčane	Ilirska Bistrica
Trsek	Koper
Trstenik	Benedikt
Trstenik	Kranj
Trstenik	Trebnje
Trščina	Sevnica
Trška Gora	Krško
Trška Gora	Novo mesto
Trška Gorca	Šentjur
Trtnik	Tolmin
Truške	Koper
Trzin	Trzin
Tržec	Videm
Tržič	Dobrepolje
Tržič	Tržič
Tržišče	Rogaška Slatina
Tržišče	Rogaška Slatina
Tržišče	Sevnica
Tublje pri Hrpeljah	Hrpelje-Kozina
Tublje pri Komnu	Sežana
Tučna	Kamnik
Tuji Grm	Ljubljana
Tuljaki	Koper
Tuncovec	Rogaška Slatina
Tunjice	Kamnik
Tunjiška Mlaka	Kamnik
Tupaliče	Preddvor
Tupelče	Komen
Turiška vas na Pohorju	Slovenska Bistrica
Turiška vas	Slovenj Gradec
Turjak	Velike Lašče
Turjanci	Radenci
Turjanski Vrh	Radenci
Turje	Hrastnik
Turnišče	Turnišče
Turno	Šentjur
Turnše	Domžale
Turški Vrh	Zavrč
Tušev Dol	Črnomelj
