= Jakovce =

- Village
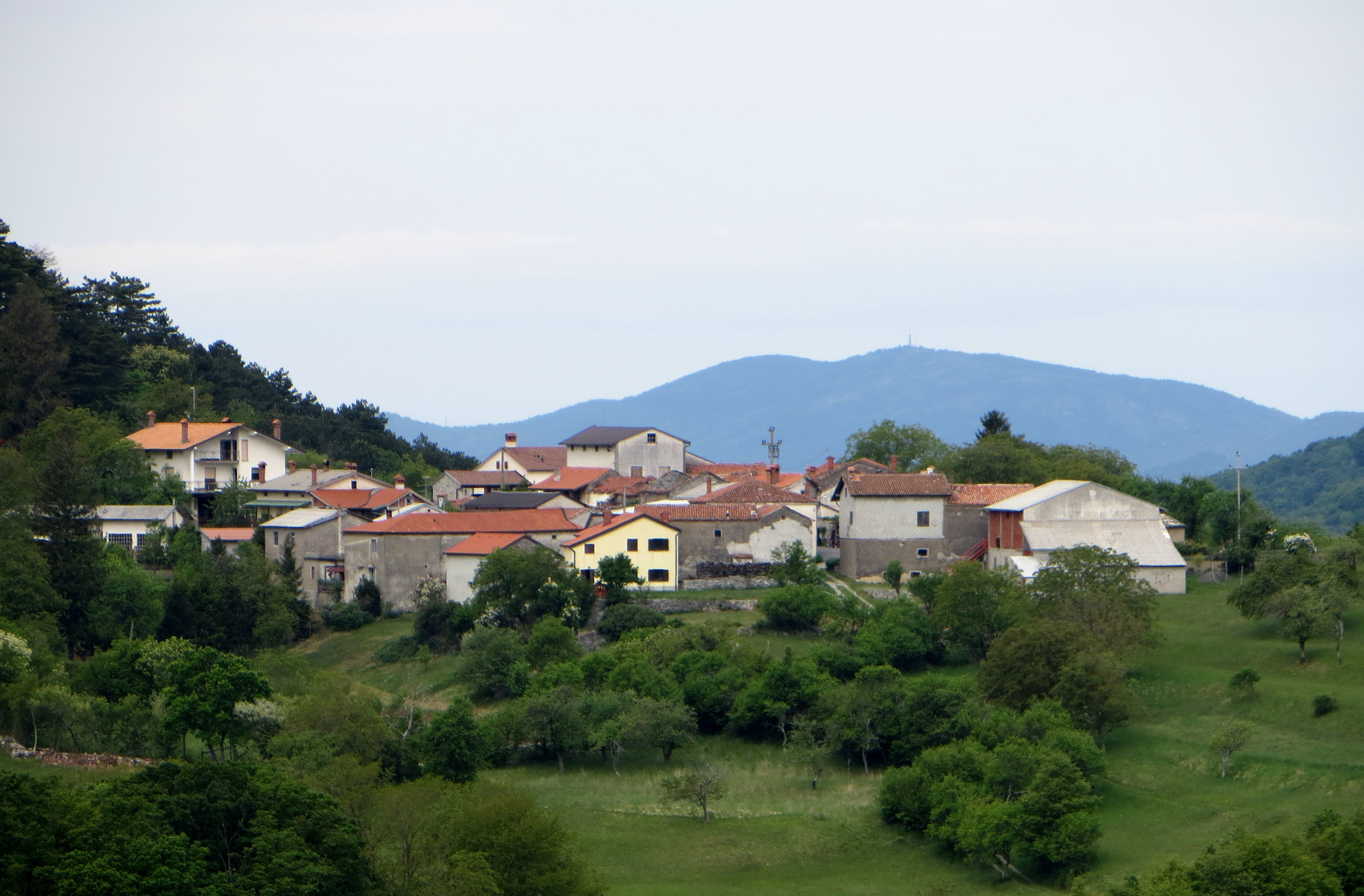

- Location in Slovenia
- Coordinates: 45°46′11.33″N 13°57′45.04″E
- Country: Slovenia
- Traditional region: Littoral
- Statistical region: Coastal–Karst
- Municipality: Sežana

Area
  - Total: 0.7 km^{2} (0.27 sq mi)
- Elevation: 550.6 m (1,806 ft)

Population (2002)
  - Total: 27

Jakovce (pronounced [ˈjaːkɔu̯tsɛ]) is a small village next to Tabor in the Municipality of Sežana in the Littoral region of Slovenia.

== Geography ==
Jakovce stands on the east side of Tabor Hill (elevation: 605 meters or 1,985 feet) in the upper Vipava Valley. A side road to Vrabče branches off from the village. The Jenčerija Common lies southwest of the village center.

== Cultural heritage ==
As late as the 1960s, older residents of the village followed the tradition of hanging ash boughs next to their fields and manure piles on Saint John's Eve. However, the older custom of hanging wreathes of flowers on the doors of the houses had died out by that time.
