= Ferdo Godina =

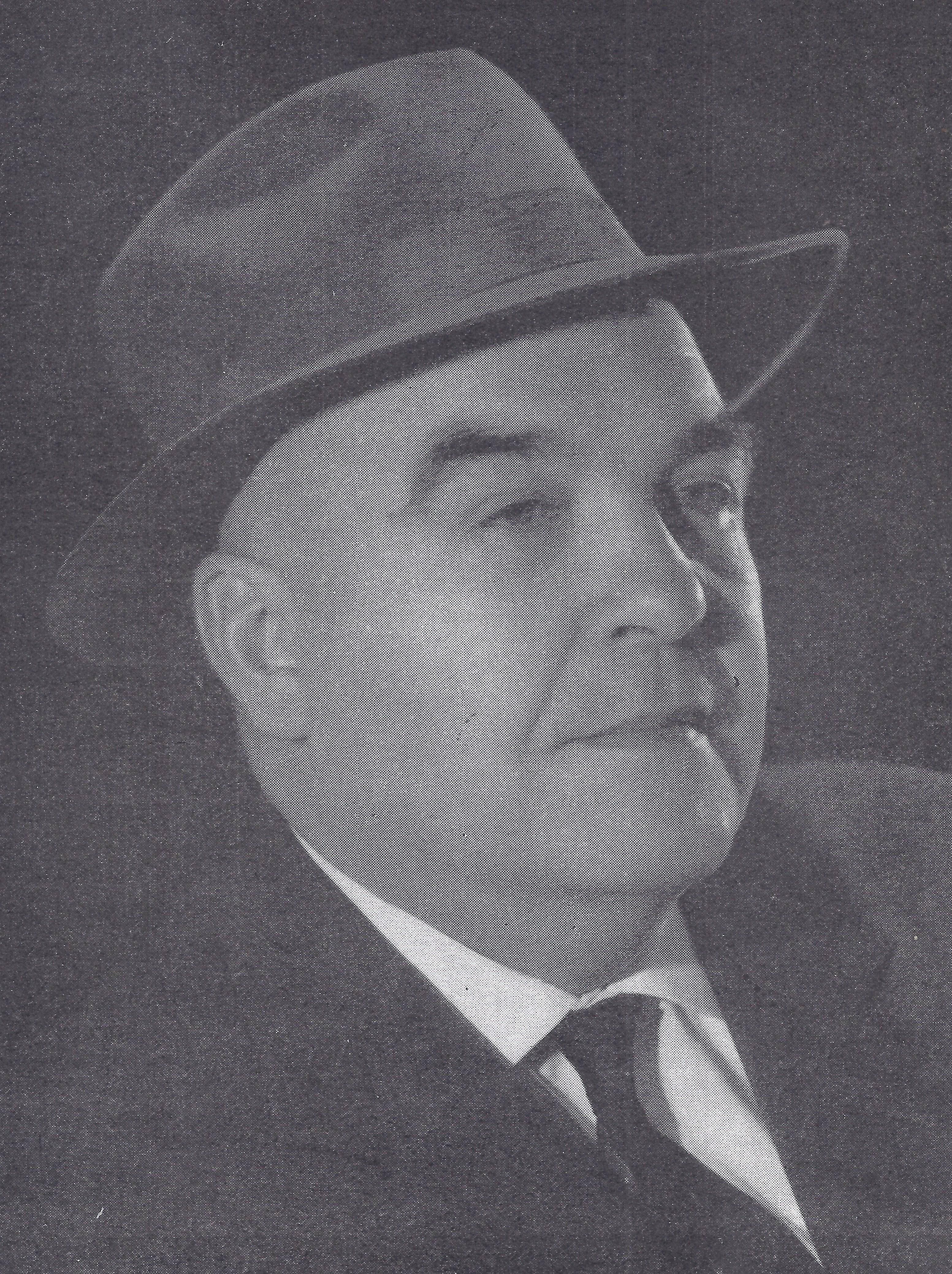
- Born: 17 October 1912; Dolnja Bistrica, Austria-Hungary (now in Slovenia)
- Died: 14 July 1994 (aged 81); Ljubljana, Slovenia
- Occupations: writer, partisan and political commissar
- Writing career
- Notable works: Krivda Jarčekove Kristine, Sezidala si bova hišico
- Notable awards: Levstik Award; 1974 for Sezidala si bova hišico

Ferdo Godina (17 October 1912 – 14 July 1994) was a Slovene writer and partisan. He was one of the early activists in the battle against the Hungarian occupation of Prekmurje during the Second World War. He wrote novels and short stories and was also a prolific writer for children and young adults.

Godina was born in 1912 in Dolnja Bistrica in what was then the Slovene March of the Kingdom of Hungary and part of Austria-Hungary and is part of Prekmurje in Slovenia. He joined the partisans in 1941. He wrote mostly short stories, socially sensitive and often written in the first-person narrative. He also published numerous works for young readers. He died in Ljubljana in 1994. The Bistrica Cultural Society is named after Godina.

He won the Levstik Award in 1974 for his series of stories for children Sezidala si bova hišico (We Shall Build a House).

== Published works ==
=== For Adult Readers ===
- Bele tulpike (White Tulips), 1945
- Iz partizanskih let: izbor proze (From the Partisan Years: Selected Prose), 1947
- Krivda Jarčekove Kristine (Kristina Jarček's Guilt), 1955
- Mi otroci vojne (We, Children of War), 1962
- Viragova Verona (Verona Virag), 1966
- Spomini na partizanska leta (Memoirs of the Partisan Years), 1961, 1963
- Prekmurje 1941 – 1945 prispevek k zgodovini NOB (Prekmurje 1941 – 1945 and Its Contribution to the National Liberation Struggle), 1967, 1980
- Jezdec brez konja (The Rider Without a Horse), 1973
- Človek živi in umira (Man Lives and Dies), 1974
- Molčeči orkester (the Silent Orchestra), 1981
- Košček spominov na izjemne čase: Ferdo Godina (1912–1994) (A Piece of Memory of Extraordinary Times: Ferdo Godina (1912–1994)), 1994

=== For Young Readers ===
- Pravljica o logarnici (The Story of the Forest Hut), 1962
- Škoda za zdravje, če se ljudje prepirajo (It's bad for Your Health When People Argue), 1962
- V logarnico je prispel ponoči čuden gost (The Strange Nigh Visitor at the Forest Hut), 1962
- Postal sem lovec na žabe (I Became a Frog Hunter), 1962
- Pri kačjih rožah v smrtni nevarnosti (Mortal Dangers at the Snake Flowers), 1962
- Lisice ne premotiš (You Can't Trick the Fox), 1962
- Razbila se je skleda z zlatim robom (The Gold-Edged Bowl Has Broken), 1962
- Strel, ki je prinesel nesrečo (The Shot That Caused the Accident), 1962
- Mož s srečo na mehurčkih (The Man With Bubbles of Luck), 1962
- Lisico smo našli (We Found the Fox), 1962
- Uharica spet v logarnici (The Owl Back At the Forest Hut), 1962
- Iskal sem moža s srečo na mehurčkih (I Looked for the Man With Bubbles of Luck), 1962
- Sezidala si bova hišico (We Shall Build a House), collection of stories 1974
- Siničke v škornju (Blue Tits in the Boot), collection of stories 1987
