= Tenetiše =

Tenetiše may refer to several places in Slovenia:

- Tenetiše, Litija, a settlement in the Municipality of Litija
- Tenetiše, Kranj, a settlement in the Municipality of Kranj
