= Zgornje Tenetiše =

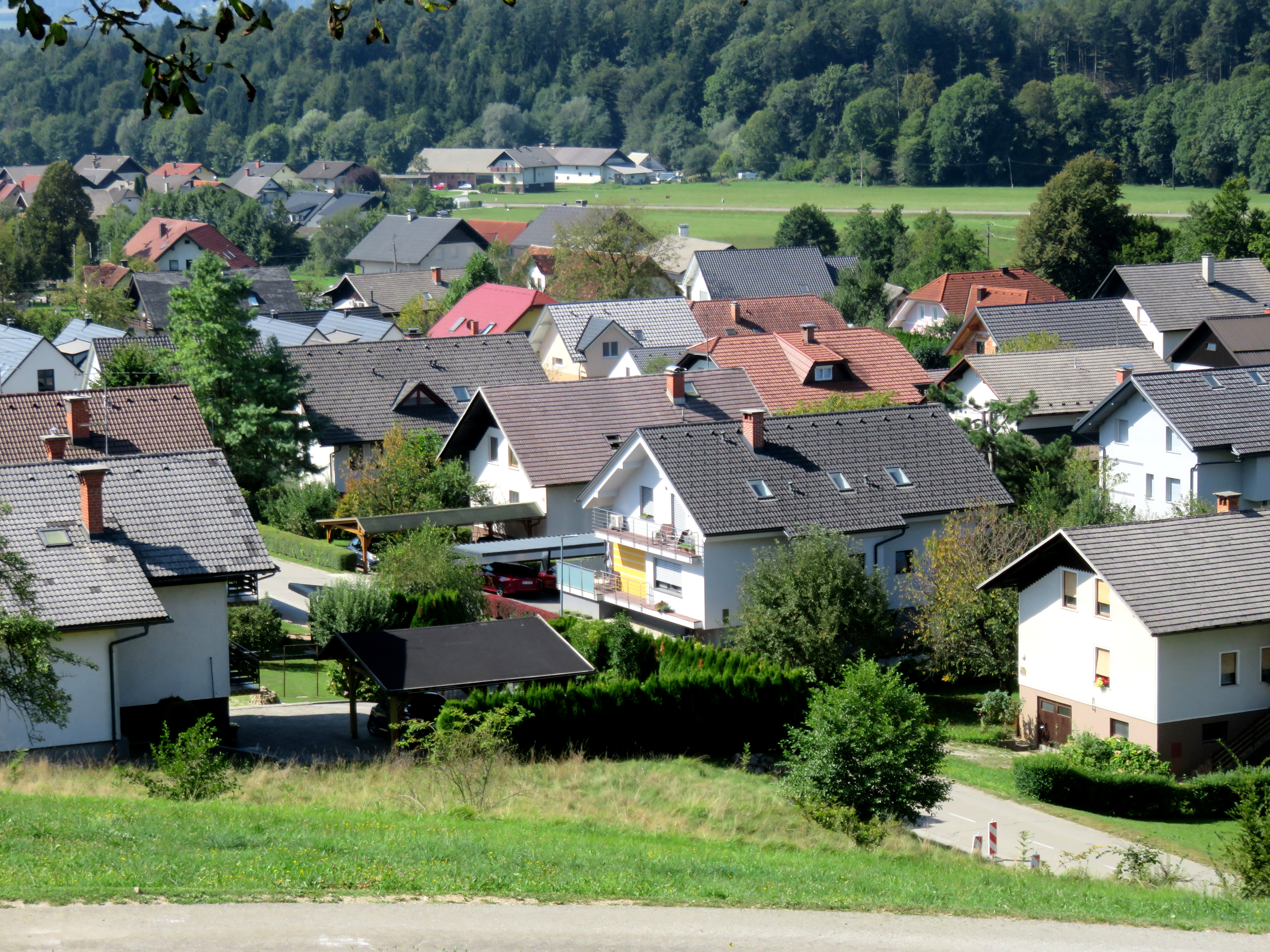

- Location in Slovenia
- Coordinates: 46°17′49″N 14°20′56″E
- Country: Slovenia
- Traditional region: Upper Carniola
- Statistical region: Upper Carniola
- Municipality: Kranj
- Elevation: 456 m (1,496 ft)

Zgornje Tenetiše (pronounced [ˈzɡoːɾnjɛ tɛnɛˈtiːʃɛ]; German: Obertenetische) is a former settlement in the Municipality of Kranj in the Upper Carniola region of Slovenia. It is now part of the village of Tenetiše.

== Geography ==
Zgornje Tenetiše stands in the northern part of the village of Tenetiše, along the road from Kranj to Trstenik. Stražnica Creek, a tributary of Mlinščica Creek, flows through the settlement.

== Name ==
The name Zgornje Tenetiše literally means 'upper Tenetiše' and contrasts with neighboring Spodnje Tenetiše (literally, 'lower Tenetiše'). Zgornje Tenetiše stands 38 meters (125 ft) higher in elevation than Spodnje Tenetiše. Zgornje Tenetiše was attested in historical sources as Ober Tenetischz in 1374, Ober Tenatischcz in 1404, and Ober Tenettisch in 1428, among other variations. See Tenetiše for the etymology of the name.

== History ==
Zgornje Tenetiše had a population of 100 in 15 houses in 1870, 71 in 15 houses in 1880, 70 in 12 houses in 1900, and 74 in 12 houses in 1931. Together with neighboring Spodnje Tenetiše, Zgornje Tenetiše was merged into a single village called Tenetiše in 1952, ending its existence as a separate settlement.

== Church ==
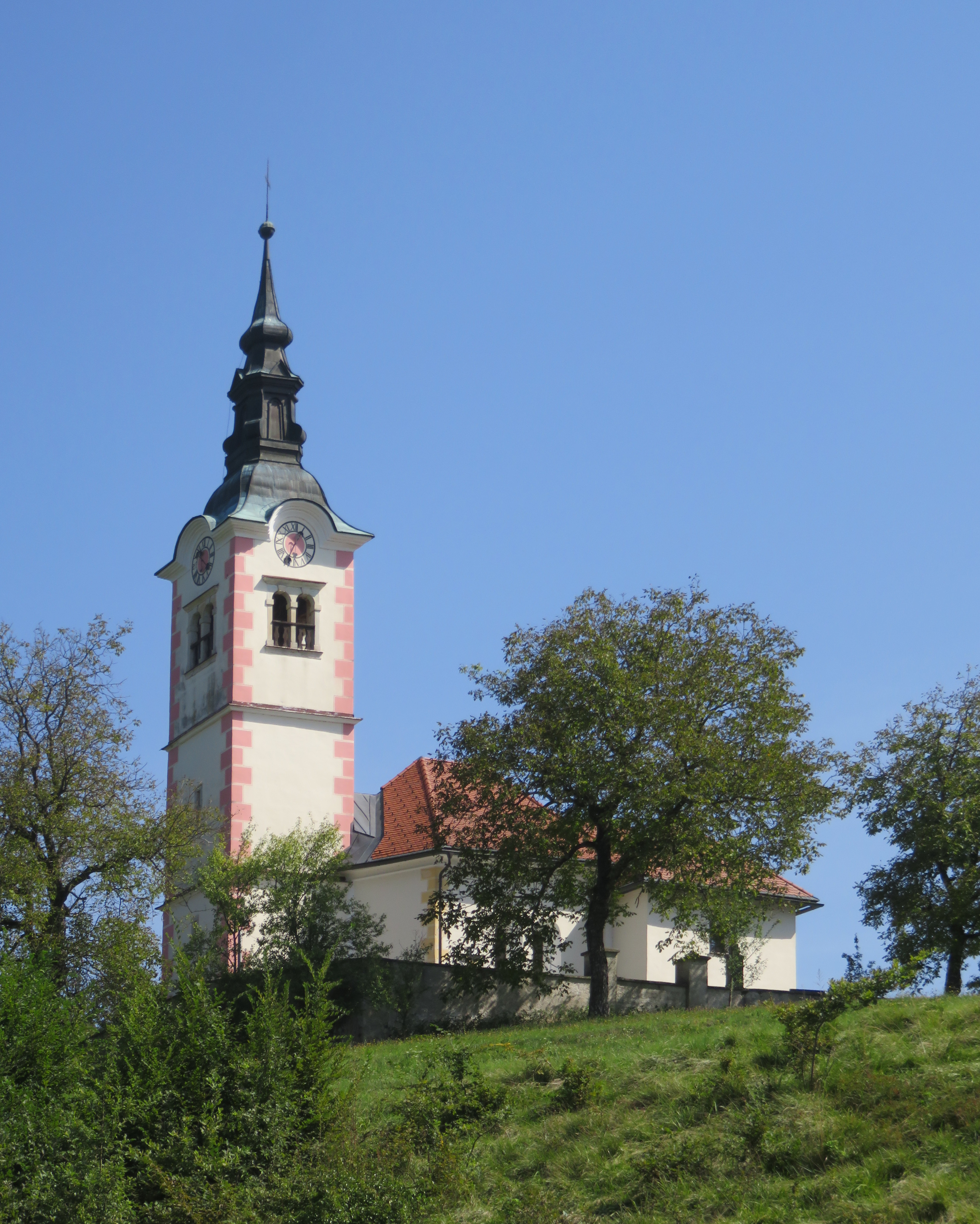
Saint Dominic's Church

The church in Zgornje Tenetiše is dedicated to Saint Dominic and belongs to the Parish of Trstenik. It was first mentioned in a visitation record of 1631. It was renovated in 1766 and 1877, and it contains a Baroque altar created by Georg Tautscher (a.k.a. Jurij Tavčar).
