= Zagorica, Litija =

Zagorica
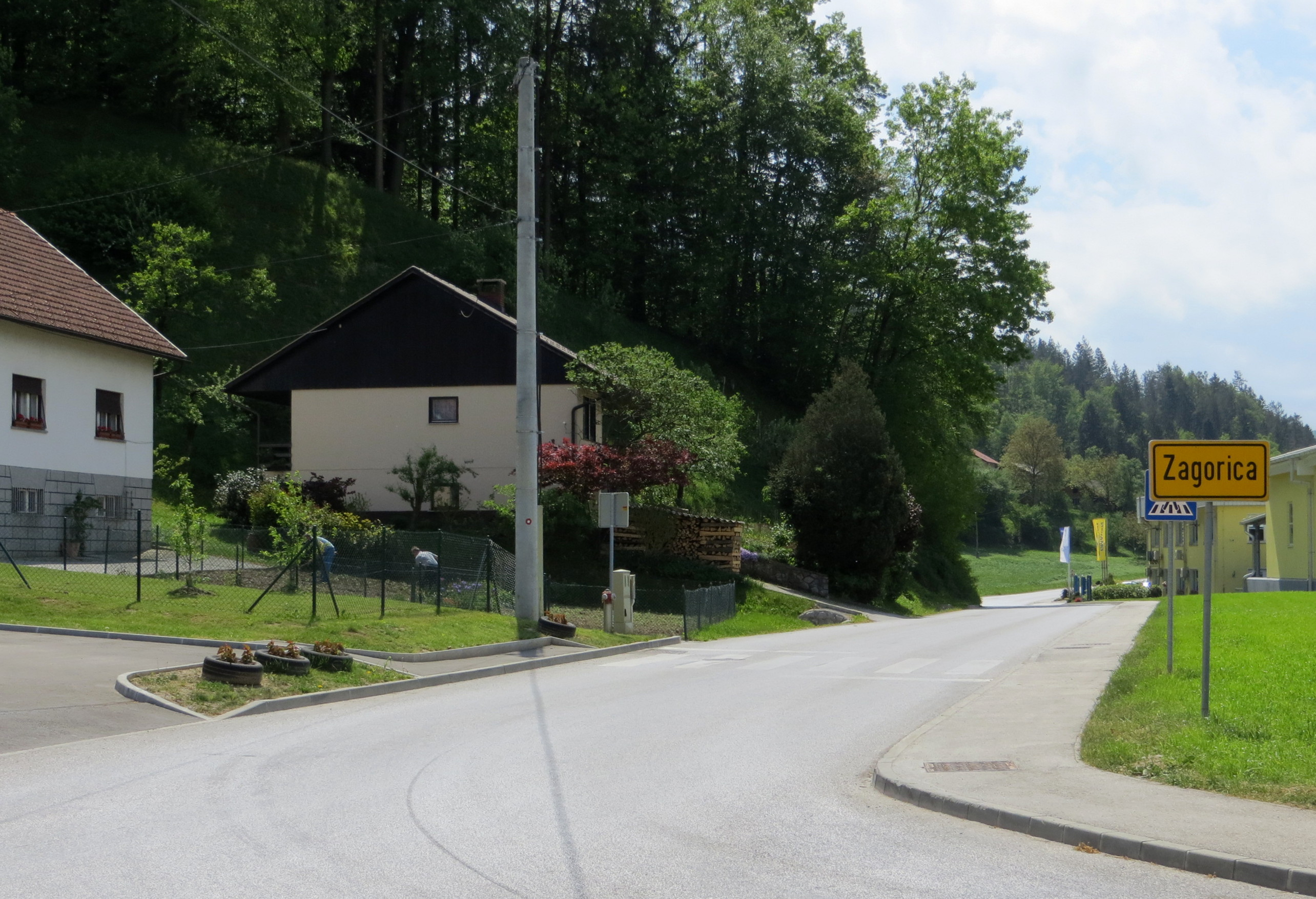

- Location in Slovenia
- Coordinates: 46°3′22.09″N 14°51′0.29″E
- Country: Slovenia
- Traditional region: Lower Carniola
- Statistical region: Central Sava
- Municipality: Litija

Area
  - Total: 0.24 km^{2} (0.093 sq mi)
- Elevation: 261.8 m (859 ft)

Population (2002)
  - Total: 37
- Postal code: 1270

Zagorica (pronounced [zaɡɔˈɾiːtsa]) is a small settlement immediately east of Litija in central Slovenia. The area is part of the traditional region of Lower Carniola and is now included with the rest of the municipality in the Central Sava Statistical Region.

== History ==
Zagorica was a hamlet of Breg pri Litiji until 1995, when it became a separate settlement. A further territorial adjustment between the two villages was made in 2006.
