= Trnovo, Ilirska Bistrica =

Trnovo
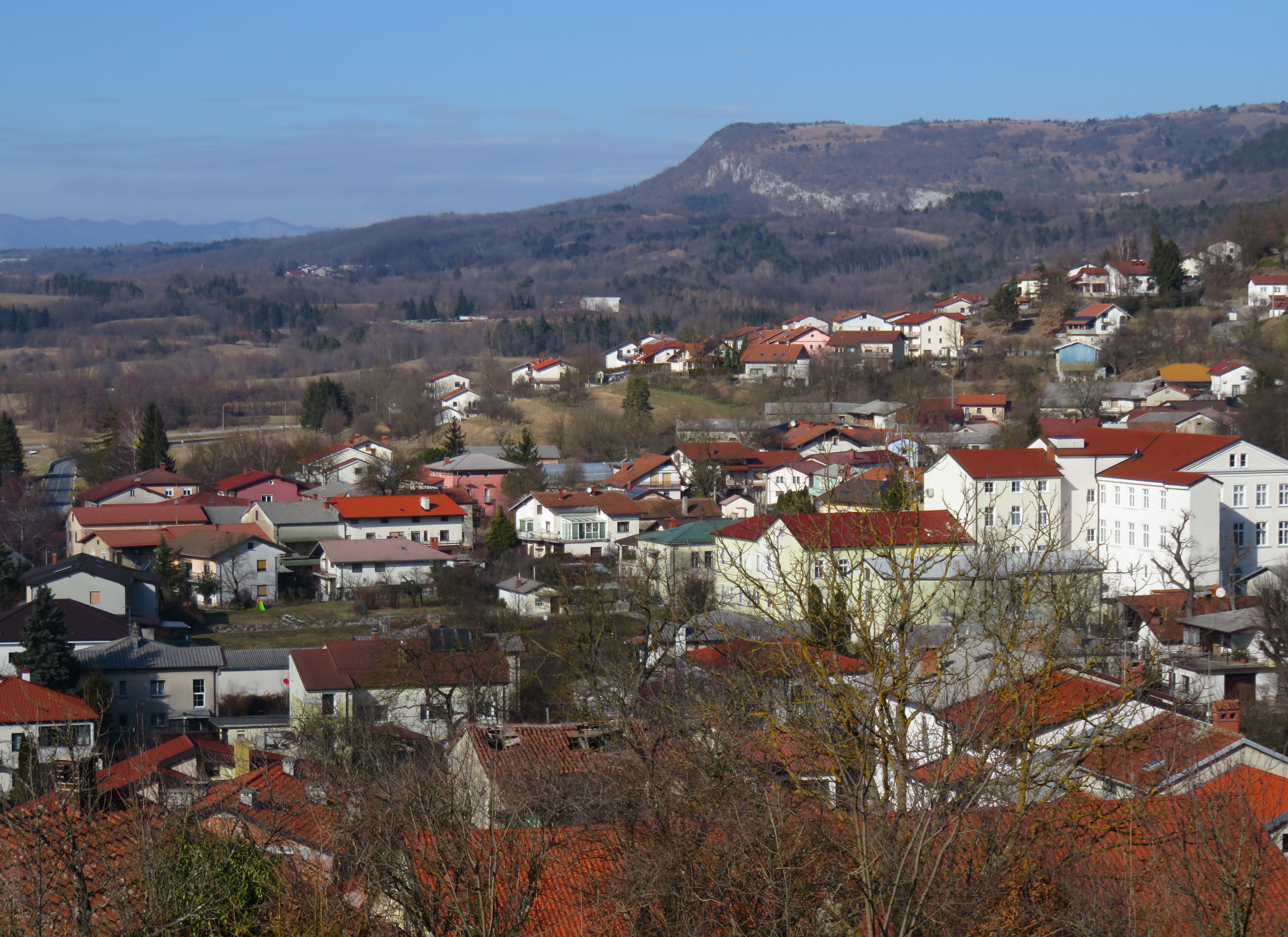

- Location in Slovenia
- Coordinates: 45°34′24″N 14°14′34″E
- Country: Slovenia
- Traditional region: Inner Carniola
- Statistical region: Littoral–Inner Carniola
- Municipality: Ilirska Bistrica
- Elevation: 422 m (1,385 ft)

Trnovo (pronounced [təɾˈnoːʋɔ]; German: Dornegg) is a formerly independent settlement in the town of Ilirska Bistrica in southwestern Slovenia. It is part of the traditional region of Inner Carniola and is now included with the rest of the municipality in the Littoral–Inner Carniola Statistical Region.

== Geography ==
Trnovo is an elongated village along the ancient road from Postojna and Pivka to Rijeka on the Adriatic coast. It lies between the right bank of the Reka River to the west and the foothills below the Snežnik Plateau to the east.

== Name ==
Trnovo was attested in historical sources as Dorneçasio in 1288, Dornech in 1316, and Dornich in 1323, among other spellings. The place name Trnovo (and related names such as Trnovec, Trnovče, Trnovci, and Trnovska vas) is common in Slovenia. The name is derived from the common noun trn 'thorn', referring to a place where thorny brush grows.

== History ==
Trnovo was annexed by Ilirska Bistrica in 1952, ending its existence as an independent settlement.

== Church ==
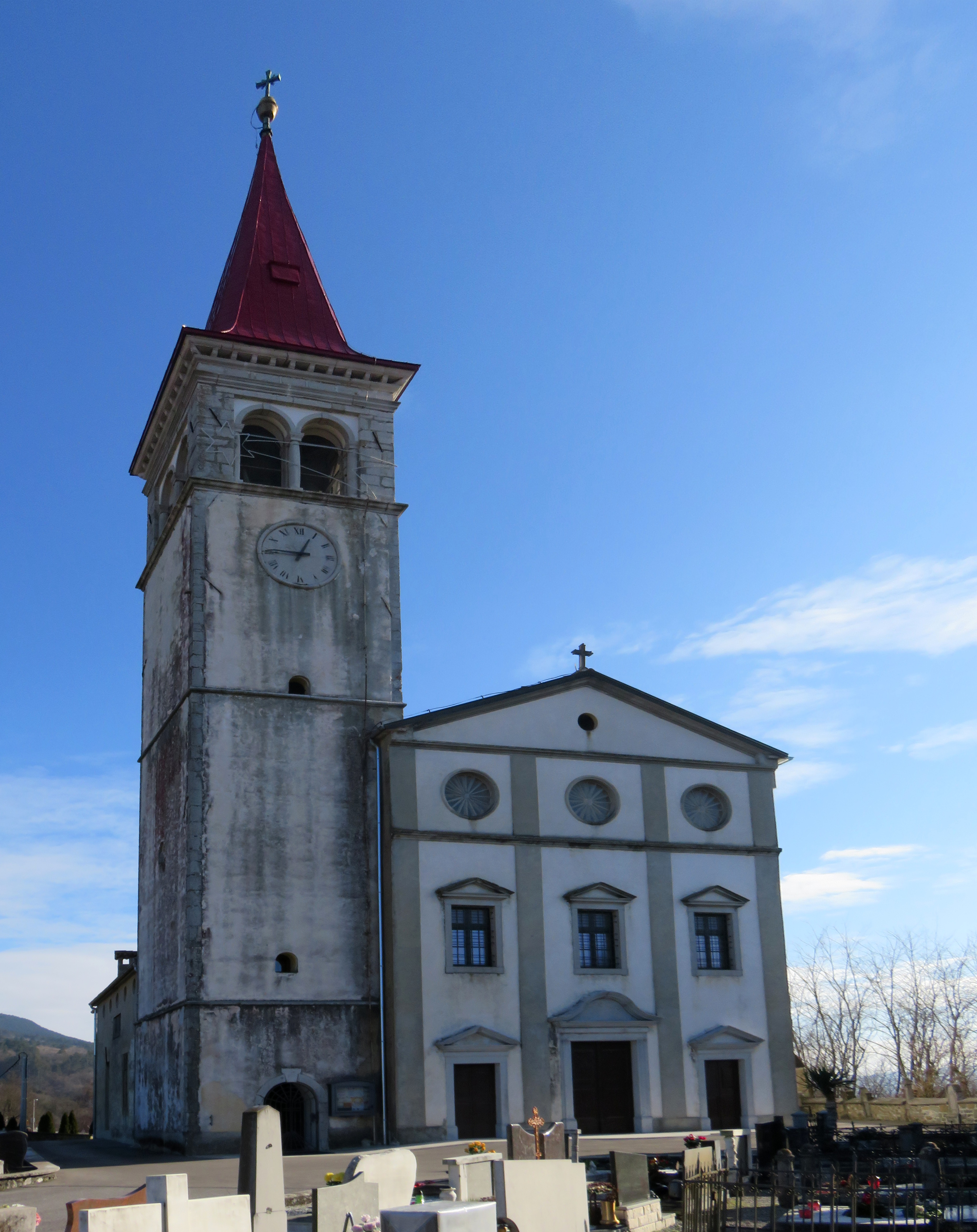
Saint Peter's Church

The church in Trnovo is dedicated to Saint Peter. It was originally a medieval structure that has been remodeled several times, with the chancel in the Gothic style. The church has external buttresses, a rectangular nave, and a bell tower next to the north wall. The interior was rearranged and painted by Tone Kralj in 1960–61. The church is located on a hill with a cemetery south of Trnovo.

== Notable people ==
Notable people that were born or lived in Trnovo include:

- Bogomil Brinšek (1884–1914), karst researcher and photographer
- Ivan Nepomuk Cerar (1789–1849), forestry expert, editor, and journalist
- Fran Gerbič (1865–1926), musician and composer
- Jožef Marija Kržišnik (1865–1926), poet and translator
- Frančiška Urbančič Štebi (1884 – after 1968), teacher
- Ivan Vesel (1840–1900), poet and translator
- Edvard Bubnič (1884–1959), cultural researcher
