= Tržišče =

Tržišče may refer to:

- Tržišče, Rogaška Slatina, a settlement in the Municipality of Rogaška Slatina, northeastern Slovenia
- Tržišče, Sevnica, a settlement in the Municipality of Sevnica, central Slovenia
