= Spodnje Tenetiše =

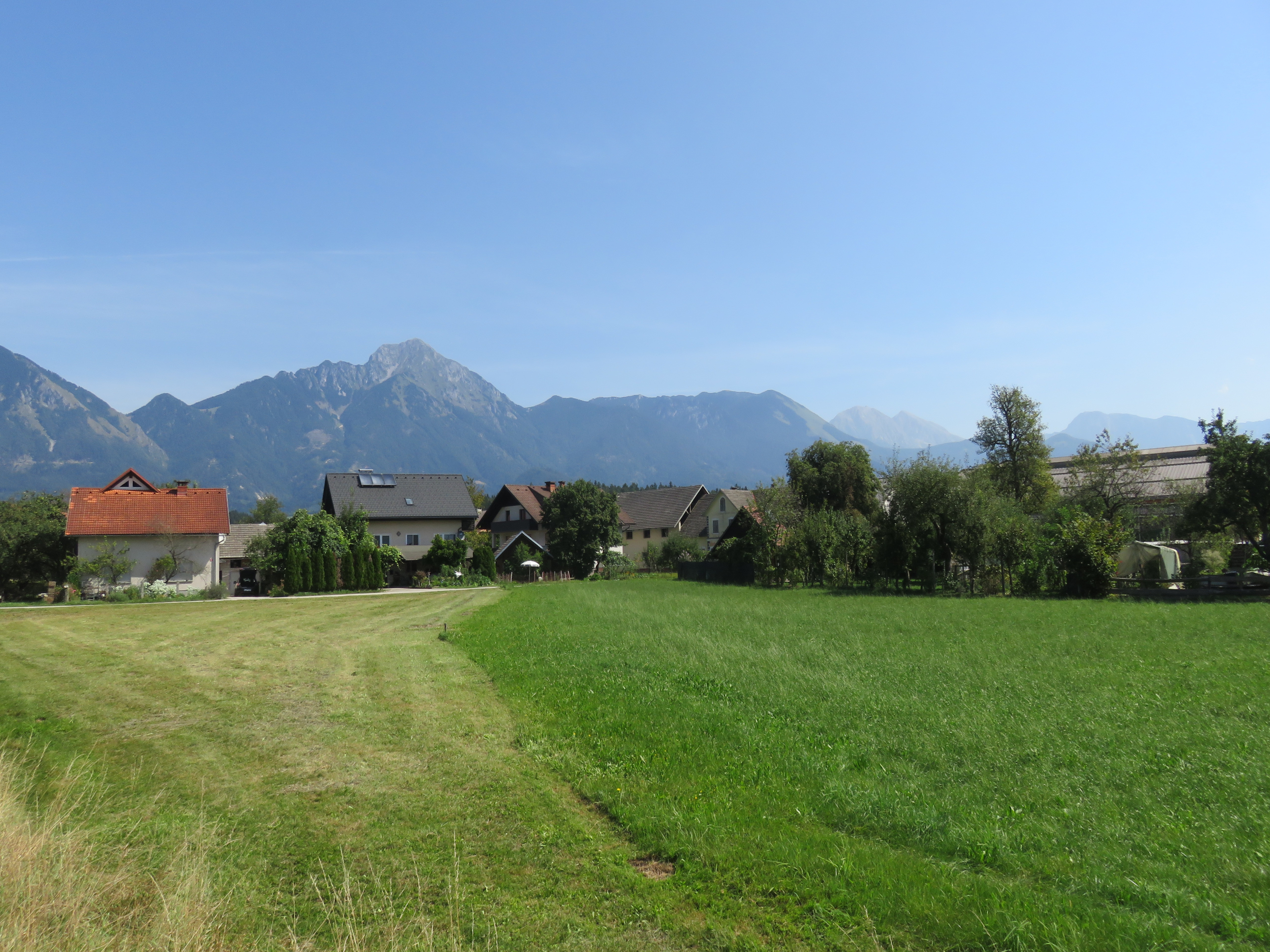

- Location in Slovenia
- Coordinates: 46°17′30″N 14°20′44″E
- Country: Slovenia
- Traditional region: Upper Carniola
- Statistical region: Upper Carniola
- Municipality: Kranj
- Elevation: 418 m (1,371 ft)

Spodnje Tenetiše (pronounced [ˈspoːdnjɛ tɛnɛˈtiːʃɛ]; German: Untertenetische) is a former settlement in the Municipality of Kranj in the Upper Carniola region of Slovenia. It is now part of the village of Tenetiše.

== Geography ==
Spodnje Tenetiše stands in the southern part of the village of Tenetiše, where the road from Kranj splits to Goriče to the north and Trstenik to the northeast. Stražnica Creek, a tributary of Mlinščica Creek, flows through the settlement.

== Name ==
The name Spodnje Tenetiše literally means 'lower Tenetiše' and contrasts with neighboring Zgornje Tenetiše (literally, 'upper Tenetiše'). Spodnje Tenetiše stands 38 meters (125 ft) lower in elevation than Zgornje Tenetiše. Spodnje Tenetiše was attested in historical sources as Nider Tenetischz in 1374, Nider Tenetisch in 1375, and Nider Tenetischs in 1404, among other variations. See Tenetiše for the etymology of the name.

== History ==
Spodnje Tenetiše had a population of 70 in 13 houses in 1870, 60 in 13 houses in 1880, 71 in 14 houses in 1900, and 85 in 13 houses in 1931. Together with neighboring Zgornje Tenetiše, Spodnje Tenetiše was merged into a single village called Tenetiše in 1952, ending its existence as a separate settlement.
