= Gerbic =

Gerbic or Gerbič is a surname. Notable people with the surname include:

- Fran Gerbič (1840–1917), Slovenian composer and operatic tenor
- Fred Gerbic (1932–1995), New Zealand politician
- Susan Gerbic (born 1962), American skeptic
