= Municipality of Črenšovci =

Municipality of Slovenia

Municipality of Črenšovci Občina Črenšovci
- Municipality
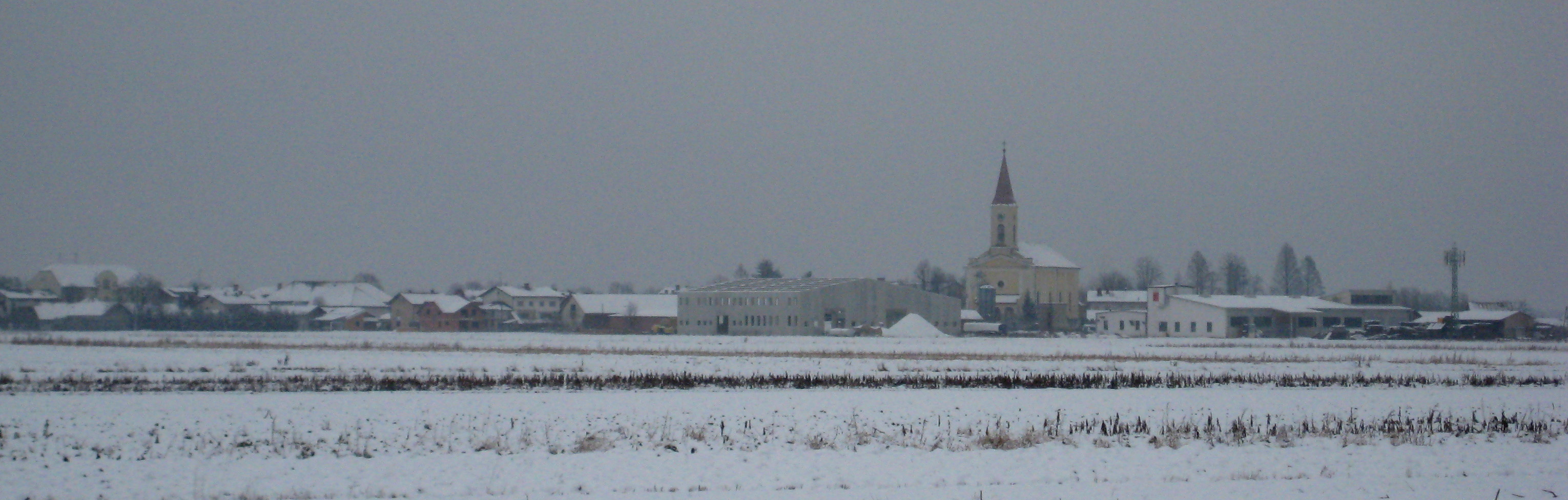

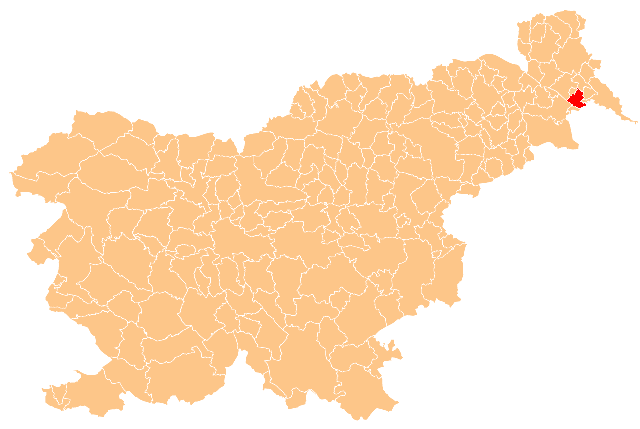
- Location of the Municipality of Črenšovci in Slovenia
- Coordinates: 46°34′N 16°17′E
- Country: Slovenia

Government
  - Mayor: Vera Markoja (Independent)

Area
  - Total: 33.7 km^{2} (13.0 sq mi)

Population (2002)
  - Total: 4,080
  - Density: 121/km^{2} (314/sq mi)
- Time zone: UTC+01 (CET)
  - Summer (DST): UTC+02 (CEST)
- Website: www.obcina-crensovci.si

The Municipality of Črenšovci (pronounced [ˈtʃɾeːnʃɔu̯tsi]; Slovene: Občina Črenšovci) is a municipality in the Prekmurje region in northeastern Slovenia. The seat of the municipality is the town of Črenšovci. It borders Croatia.

== Settlements ==
In addition to the municipal seat of Črenšovci, the municipality also includes the following settlements:

- Dolnja Bistrica
- Gornja Bistrica
- Srednja Bistrica
- Trnje
- Žižki
