= Srednja Bistrica =

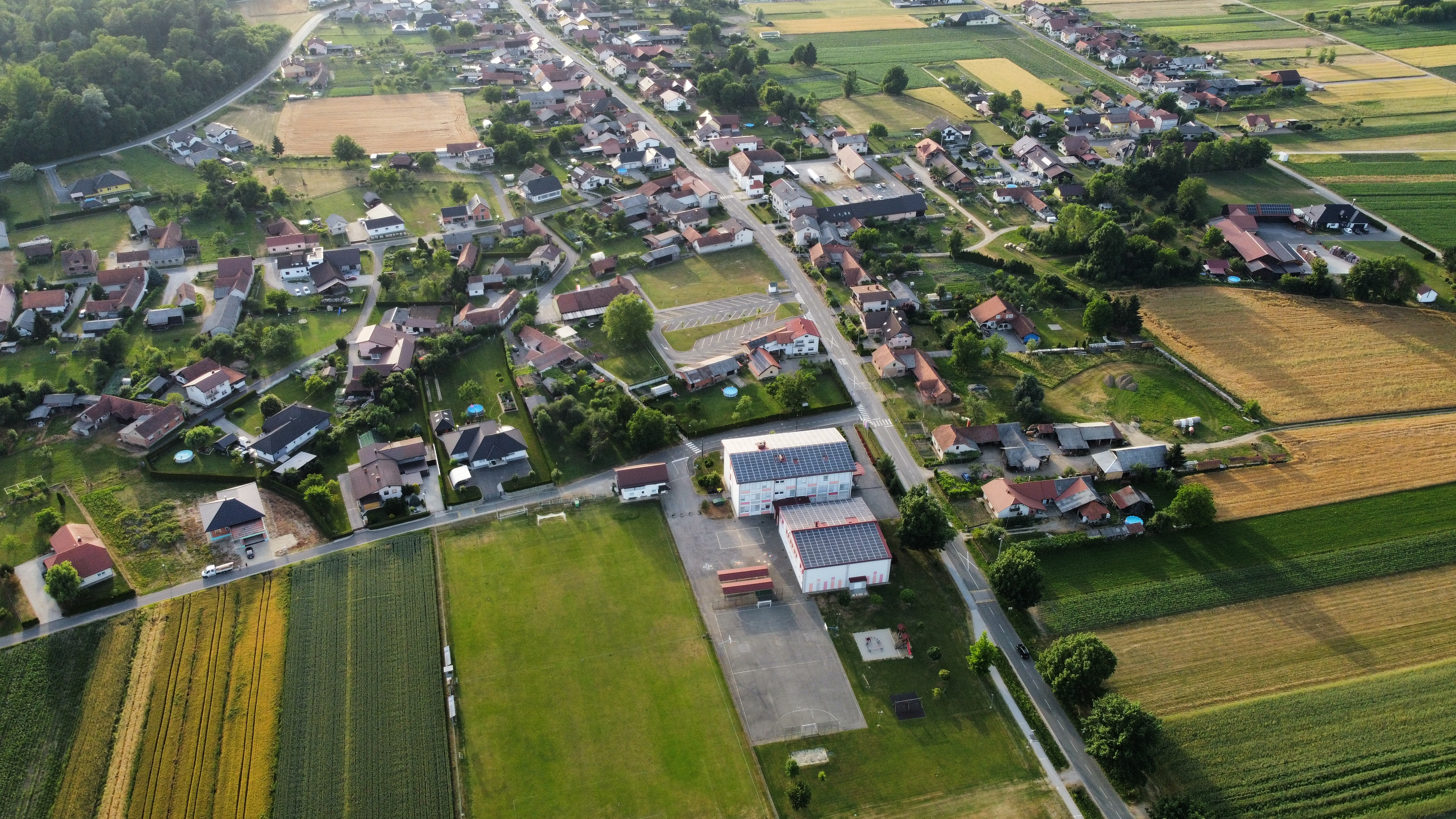

- Location in Slovenia
- Coordinates: 46°33′2.45″N 16°16′36.61″E
- Country: Slovenia
- Traditional region: Prekmurje
- Statistical region: Mura
- Municipality: Črenšovci

Area
  - Total: 2.97 km^{2} (1.15 sq mi)
- Elevation: 171.2 m (562 ft)

Population (2020)
  - Total: 434
  - Density: 146/km^{2} (378/sq mi)

Srednja Bistrica (pronounced [ˈsɾeːdnja ˈbiːstɾitsa]; Hungarian: Középbeszterce) is a village on the left bank of the Mura River in the Municipality of Črenšovci in the Prekmurje region of northeastern Slovenia.
