= Žižki =

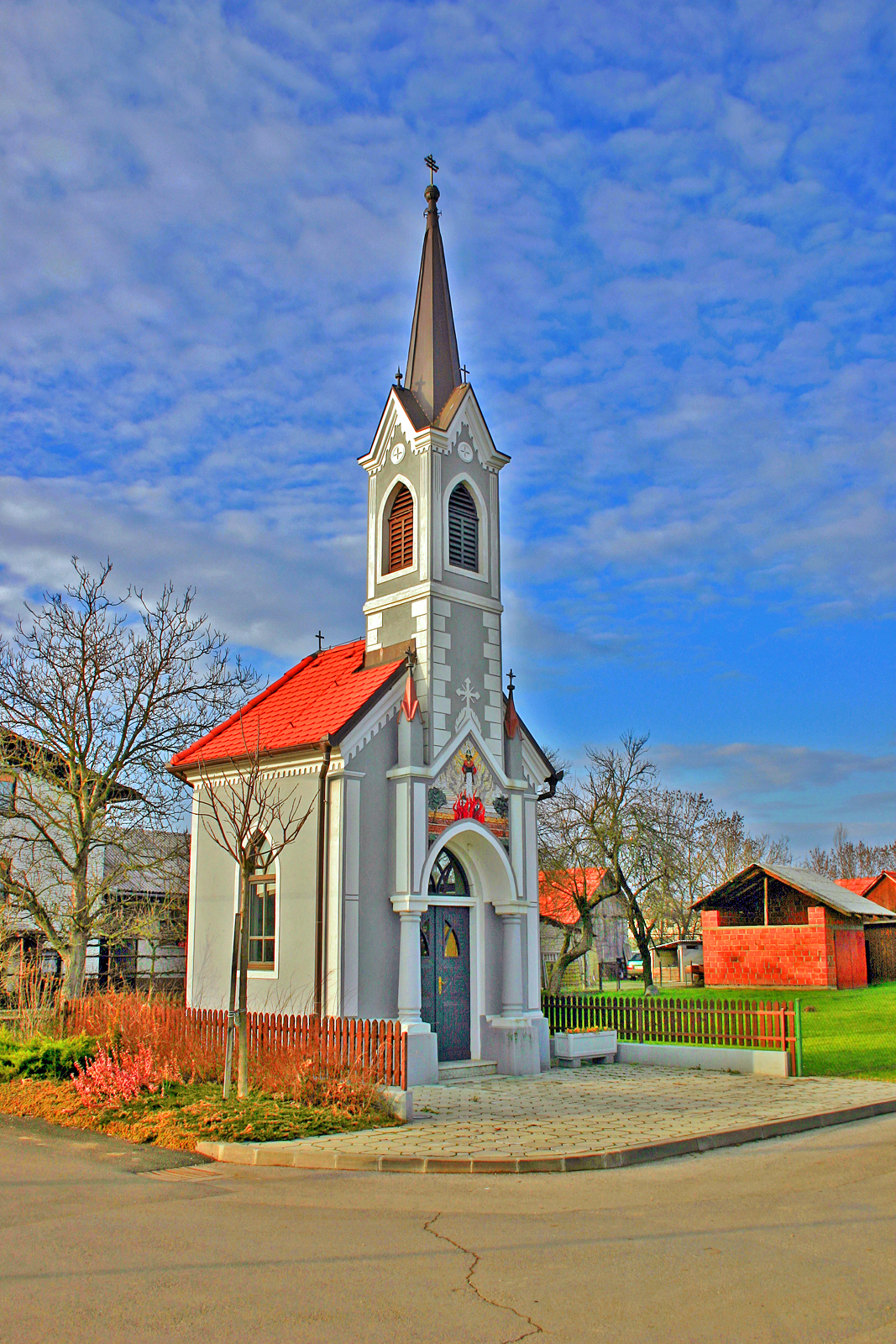

- Location in Slovenia
- Coordinates: 46°34′23.33″N 16°18′25.46″E
- Country: Slovenia
- Traditional region: Prekmurje
- Statistical region: Mura
- Municipality: Črenšovci

Area
  - Total: 3.13 km^{2} (1.21 sq mi)
- Elevation: 168.9 m (554 ft)

Population (2020)
  - Total: 552
  - Density: 176/km^{2} (457/sq mi)

Žižki (pronounced [ˈʒiːʃki]; Hungarian: Zsizsekszer) is a village in the Municipality of Črenšovci in the Prekmurje region of northeastern Slovenia.

There is a small chapel-shrine in the settlement dedicated to Saint Florian. It was built in 1936 in a Neo-Gothic style.
