= Jarmila Gerbič =

Slovenian opera singer and music educator (1877–1964)

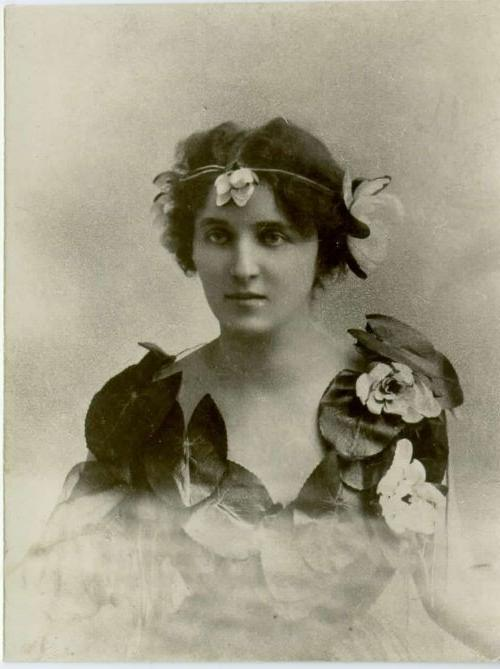
- Gerbič in c. 1900
- Born: Jarmila Lily Gerbič; 24 May 1877; Zagreb, Kingdom of Croatia-Slavonia
- Died: 22 August 1964 (aged 87); Ljubljana
- Occupations: Opera singer; music teacher
- Parent(s): Milka Daneš Gerbič (mother); Fran Gerbič (father)

Jarmila Lily Gerbič (24 May 1877 – 22 August 1964) was a Slovenian soprano, opera singer, and music teacher. She was the first Slovenian woman to complete studies in both solo singing and piano at the conservatory.

== Childhood ==
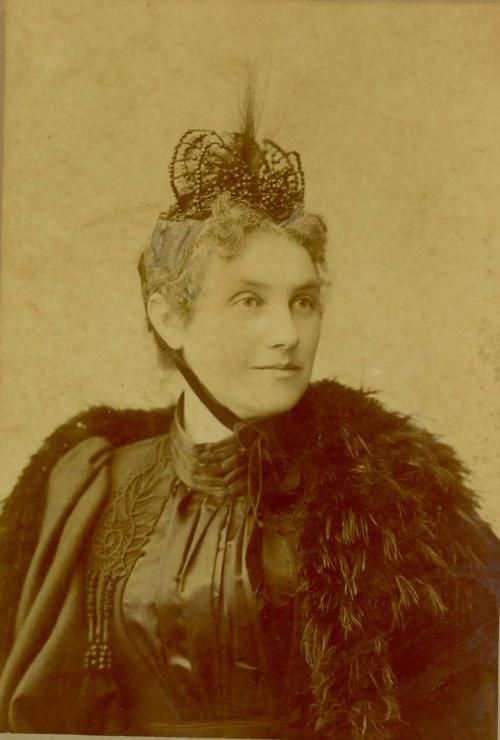
Jarmila's mother, soprano Milka Daneš Gerbič, c. 1890

Jarmila Gerbič was born on 24 May 1877 in Zagreb, where her parents were employed at the Croatian National Theatre. Her mother, Emilie Jozefa Daneš (1854–1933), was a Czech opera singer, soprano and music teacher, better known as Milka Daneš Gerbič. Her father was Fran Gerbič (1840–1917), Slovene opera singer, tenor, composer and music teacher. She had two younger brothers: one died in childhood, the other was Viktor Hugo Gerbič (1881–1953), an actor, diplomat, and publicist.

In 1878, the family returned to Fran Gerbič's hometown, Cerknica, due to his illness. After two years there, they moved to Ulm, and later to Lviv, from where her parents toured Europe as performers. Jarmila's father began teaching her singing at an early age.

In 1886, the Ljubljana Music Society invited her father to take over its music school, choir, and conducting duties for the Dramatic Society, which he accepted. The family settled in Ljubljana together with Milka's sister, singer Luiza Daneš (1863–1918). There, Jarmila's mother was employed as prima donna of the Dramatic Society, her father as kapellmeister and head of the music school, and her aunt as a singer in the Dramatic Society. Jarmila studied singing and piano at the Music Society school.

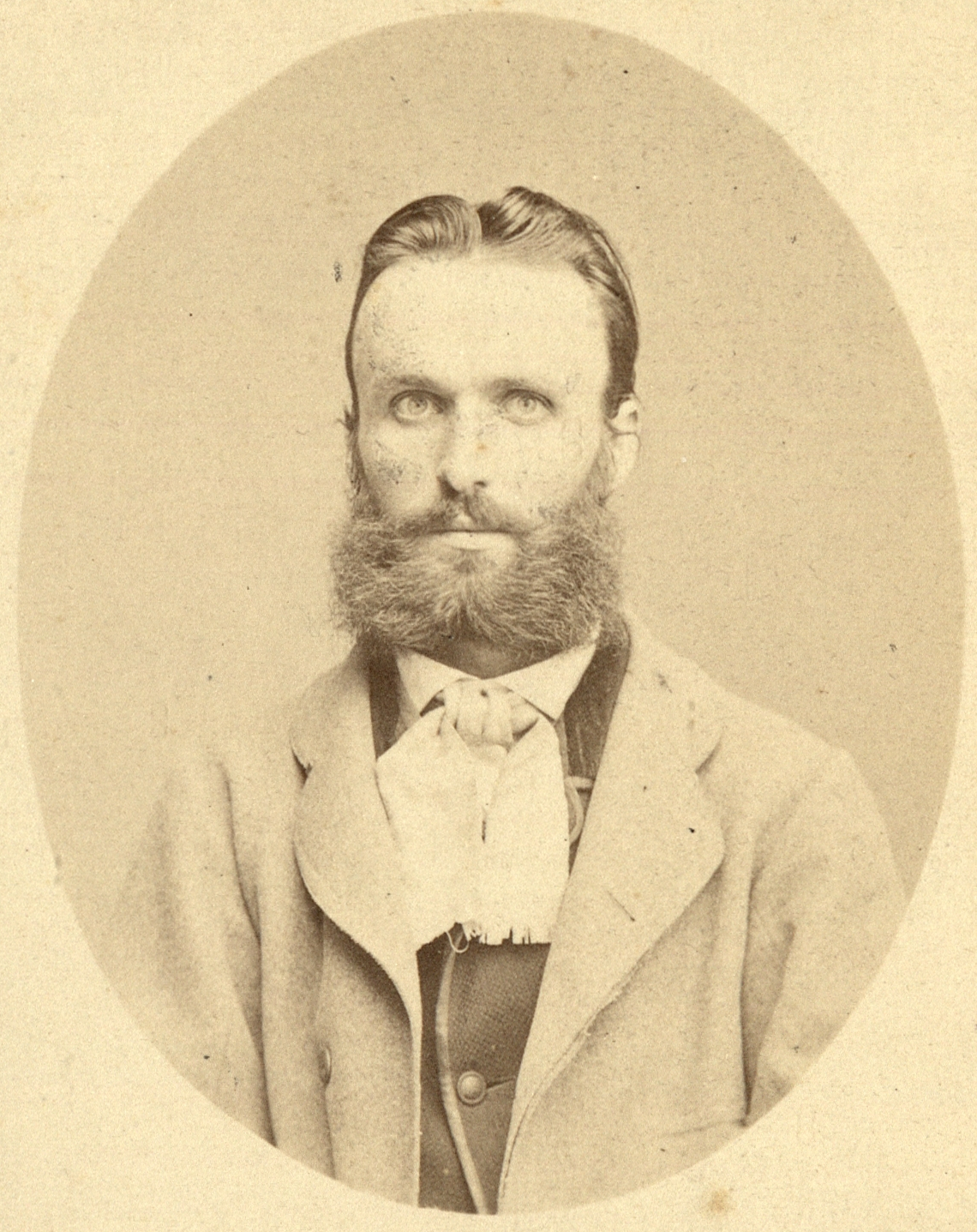
Jarmila's father, composer Fran Gerbič, in 1867

== Career ==
In 1900, she moved to Prague, where she began studying solo singing and piano at the Prague Conservatory of Music. Between 1901 and 1910 she performed concerts in Vienna, Gorizia, Plzeň, Trieste, Belgrade, Zagreb, and Prague. In January 1902 she graduated with distinction in solo singing and piano from the Prague Conservatory. She thus became the first Slovenian woman to complete studies in both solo singing and piano at the conservatory.

In 1906 she became a singing teacher and choir director at the St. Notburga Orphanage in Prague. In 1908 she twice performed in Ljubljana, singing the title role in the first Slovene staging of Antonín Dvořák's opera Rusalka. That same year she was appointed professor of singing at the Minerva Girls' high school in Prague.

In 1909 she returned to Ljubljana because of her father's illness. From 1910 to 1914 she worked as a teacher of singing and piano in the Ljubljana Music Society. In 1914 she opened her own private music school, where she taught singing, piano, music theory, and declamation. She ran the school for nearly 40 years.

== Later life and death ==
Between 1948 and 1953, Jarmila Gerbič donated much of her parents' legacy (documents, compositions, correspondence, speeches, notebooks, printed works, etc.) to the National and University Library in Ljubljana. Among the items was her father's piano, built between 1845 and 1850 in the renowned workshop of Ignaz Bösendorfer in Vienna.

Jarmila Gerbič died on 22 August 1964 in Ljubljana.
