= Frančiška Urbančič Štebi =

Slovenian teacher (1884 – after 1968)

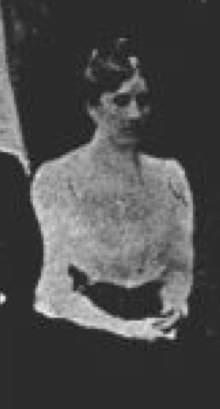
- Frančiška Urbančič Štebi in 1908
- Born: Frančiška Urbančič; 3 June 1884; Trnovo
- Died: After 1968
- Occupation: teacher

Frančiška Urbančič Štebi, also known as Francka Urbančič Štebi, (3 June 1884 – after 1968) was a Slovenian teacher. She was the first Slovenian woman to graduate from a Slovenian high school with permission to enroll at a university.

== Childhood ==
Frančiška Urbančič Štebi was born on 3 June 1884 into a Slovenian family in the village of Trnovo, which is now part of Ilirska Bistrica. Her mother was Frančiška Trčelj and her father was Jožef Urbančič.

In 1900 she began studying at the women's teacher training college in Ljubljana. She graduated there in 1904. The certificate she obtained did not allow her to enroll at a university.

== Work and further education ==
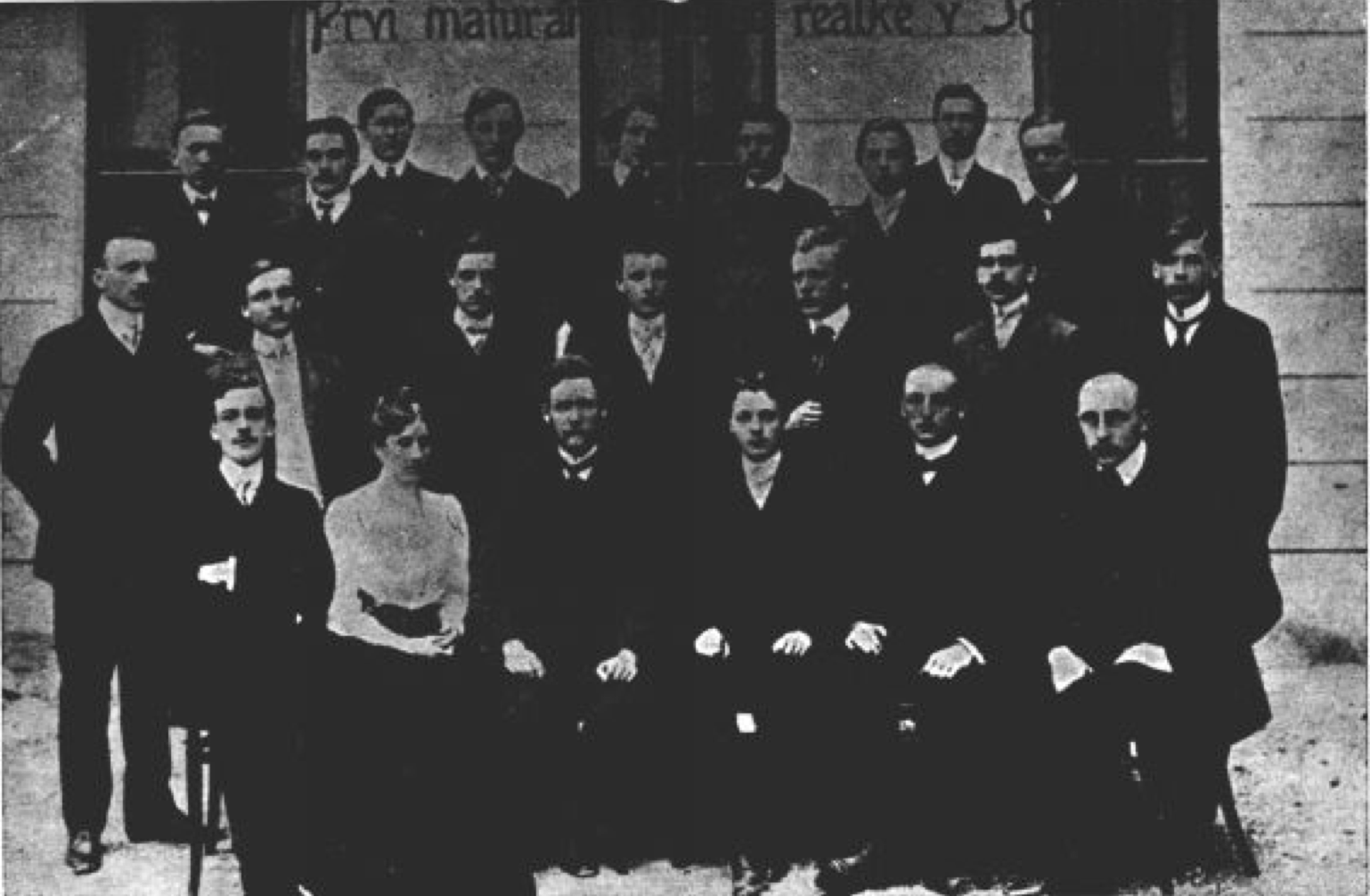
Group photo of the first graduating class of the Idrija Realschule in 1908. Frančiška Urbančič Štebi is second from the left in the front row.

In 1905 she got employed as a teacher in Postojna. Shortly afterwards she married.

On 23 March 1908 she received permission from the Imperial-Royal Provincial School Council for Carniola to take the high school leaving examination (Slovene: matura) at the Idrija Realschule (now Jurij Vega High School in Idrija). She passed her leaving examination there on 8 July 1908. That certificate allowed her to enroll at a university. She thus became the first Slovenian woman to graduate from a Slovenian high school with permission to enroll at a university. (The 1908 leaving examination in Idrija was also the first high school examination at which students could take the tests in the Slovenian language.)

After the leaving examination, she pursued further education and work in technology.

In 1958 she joined the other surviving first graduates of the Idrija Realschule at the municipal celebration of the 50th anniversary of the first leaving examination there. By 1968, she was living in Ljubljana's Bežigrad neighborhood.
