= Trnje, Trebnje =

Trnje
- Location in Slovenia
- Coordinates: 45°56′16.14″N 14°58′5.76″E
- Country: Slovenia
- Traditional region: Lower Carniola
- Statistical region: Southeast Slovenia
- Municipality: Trebnje

Area
  - Total: 0.08 km^{2} (0.031 sq mi)
- Elevation: 296.1 m (971 ft)

Population (2002)
  - Total: 27

Trnje (pronounced [ˈtəɾnjɛ]) is a small settlement north of Velika Loka in the Municipality of Trebnje in eastern Slovenia. It lies on the northern side of the regional road leading from Trebnje to Šentlovrenc. The area is part of the historical region of Lower Carniola. The municipality is now included in the Southeast Slovenia Statistical Region.
