= Trnovica, Ivančna Gorica =

Trnovica
- Location in Slovenia
- Coordinates: 45°54′12.16″N 14°52′7.17″E
- Country: Slovenia
- Traditional region: Lower Carniola
- Statistical region: Central Slovenia
- Municipality: Ivančna Gorica

Area
  - Total: 1.33 km^{2} (0.51 sq mi)
- Elevation: 367.9 m (1,207 ft)

Population (2002)
  - Total: 22

Trnovica (pronounced [təɾˈnɔːʋitsa] or [təɾˈnoːʋitsa]) is a small settlement in the Municipality of Ivančna Gorica in central Slovenia. It lies in the hills southeast of Ivančna Gorica in the historical region of Lower Carniola. The municipality is now included in the Central Slovenia Statistical Region.
