= Trebež, Ivančna Gorica =

Trebež
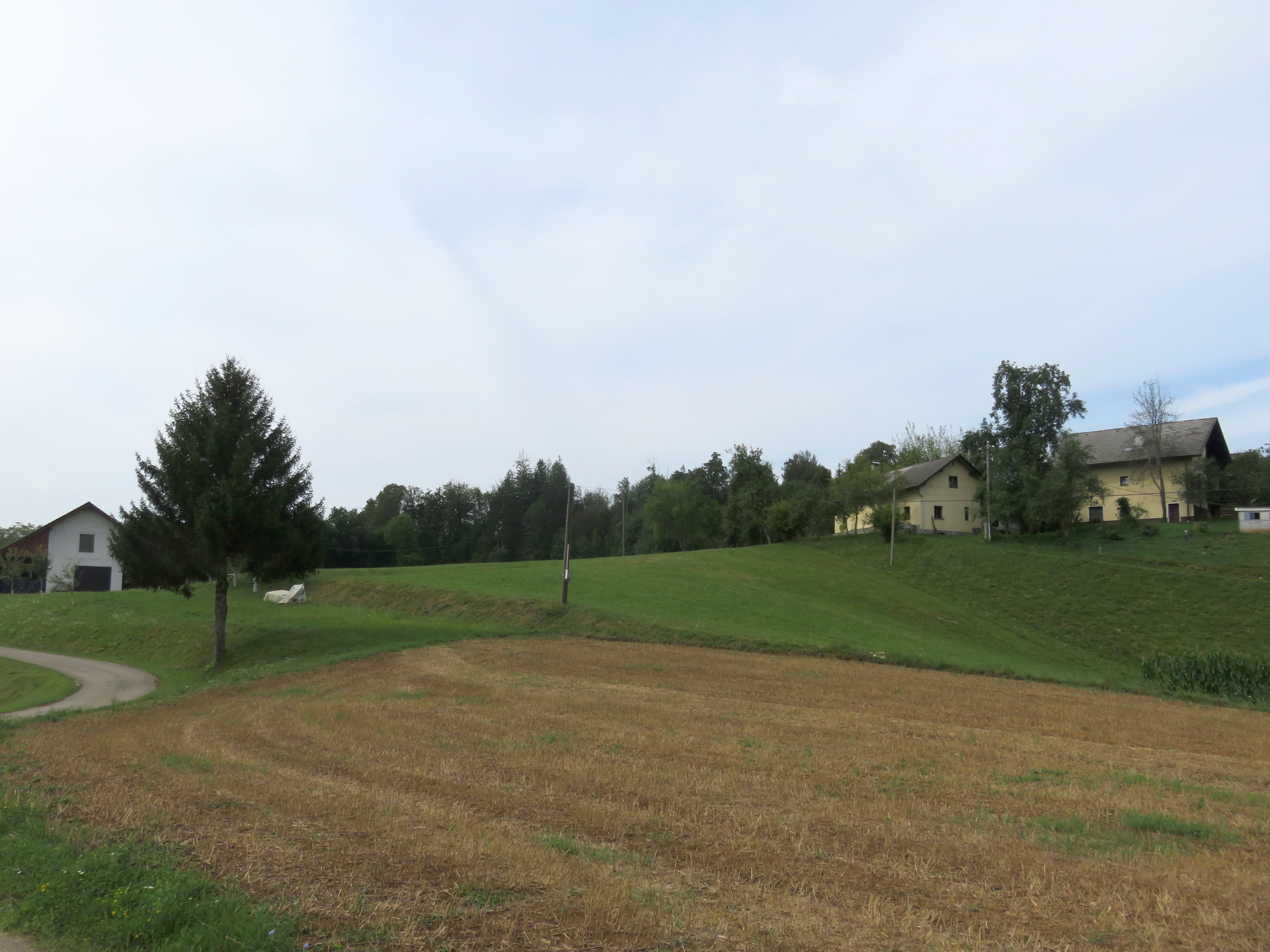

- Location in Slovenia
- Coordinates: 45°53′15.54″N 14°49′2.23″E
- Country: Slovenia
- Traditional region: Lower Carniola
- Statistical region: Central Slovenia
- Municipality: Ivančna Gorica

Area
  - Total: 0.21 km^{2} (0.081 sq mi)
- Elevation: 341.3 m (1,120 ft)

Population (2002)
  - Total: 12

Trebež (pronounced [ˈtɾeːbɛʃ]) is a small settlement in the hills southeast of Muljava in the Municipality of Ivančna Gorica in central Slovenia. The area is part of the historical region of Lower Carniola. The municipality is now included in the Central Slovenia Statistical Region.

A small roadside chapel-shrine in the settlement dates to the early 20th century.
