= Tenetiše, Litija =

Tenetiše Gornja Vas
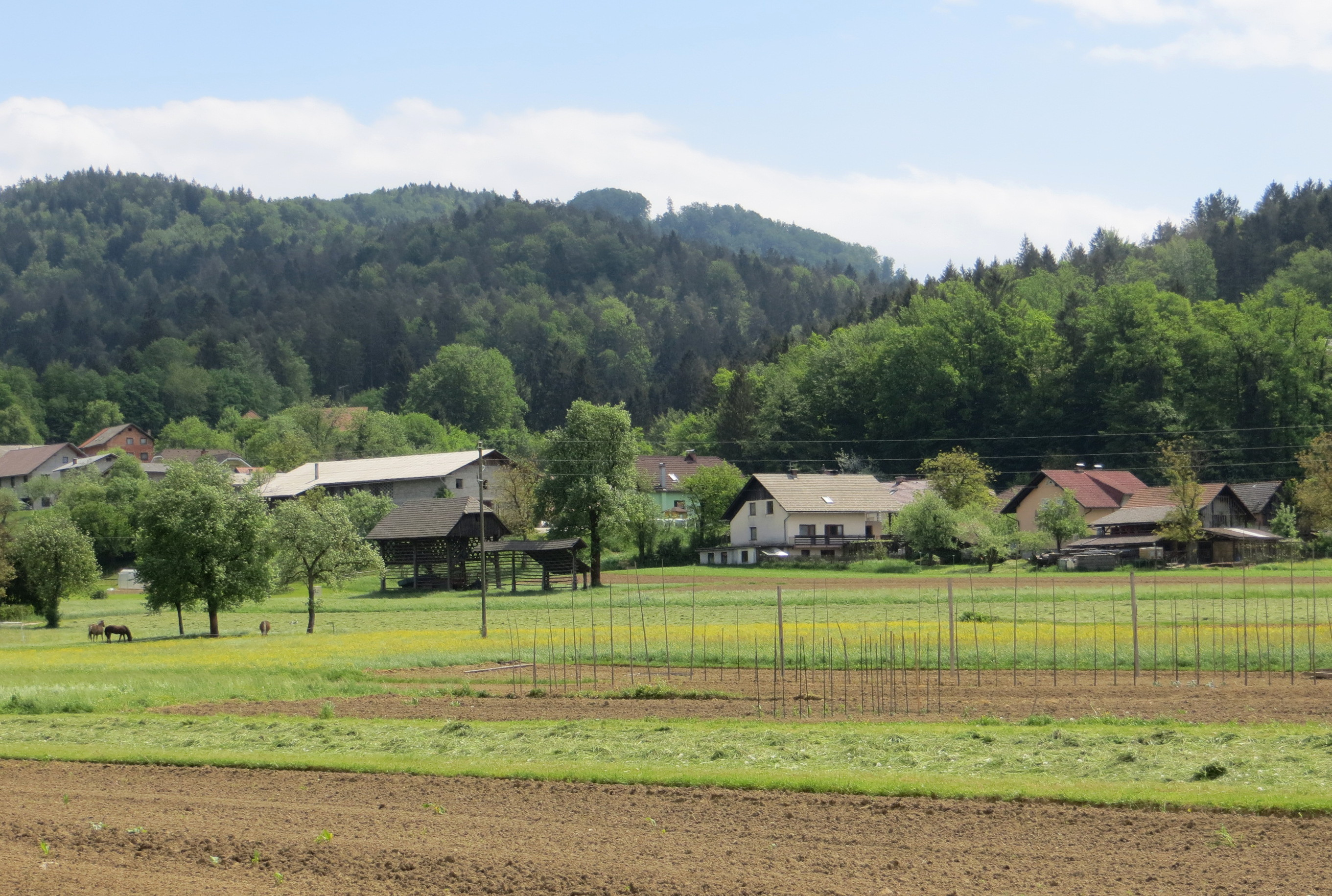

- Location in Slovenia
- Coordinates: 46°3′42.85″N 14°51′21.64″E
- Country: Slovenia
- Traditional region: Lower Carniola
- Statistical region: Central Sava
- Municipality: Litija

Area
  - Total: 1.73 km^{2} (0.67 sq mi)
- Elevation: 255.5 m (838 ft)

Population (2002)
  - Total: 163
- Postal code: 1270

Tenetiše (pronounced [tɛnɛˈtiːʃɛ]; in older sources also Tenetišče, German: Tenetitsch) is a settlement on the right bank of the Sava River east of Litija in central Slovenia. The area is part of the traditional region of Lower Carniola and is now included with the rest of the Municipality of Litija in the Central Sava Statistical Region.

== Name ==
The name Tenetiše (a feminine plural noun) is derived from the earlier plural demonym *Tenetiščane, meaning 'residents of Tenetišče' (a neuter singular noun). This, in turn, is derived from the common noun *teneto or *tenetъ 'hunting net', and may refer to a hunting area where small game or birds were caught using nets. Tenetiše was formerly a hamlet of Breg pri Litiji known as Gornja vas (literally, 'upper village'). Tenetiše was known as Tenetitsch in German.

== Notable people ==
Notable people that were born or lived in Tenetiše include:

- Jože Štok (a.k.a. Korotan) (born 1924), Partisan soldier and career officer
