= Tlake, Grosuplje =

Tlake
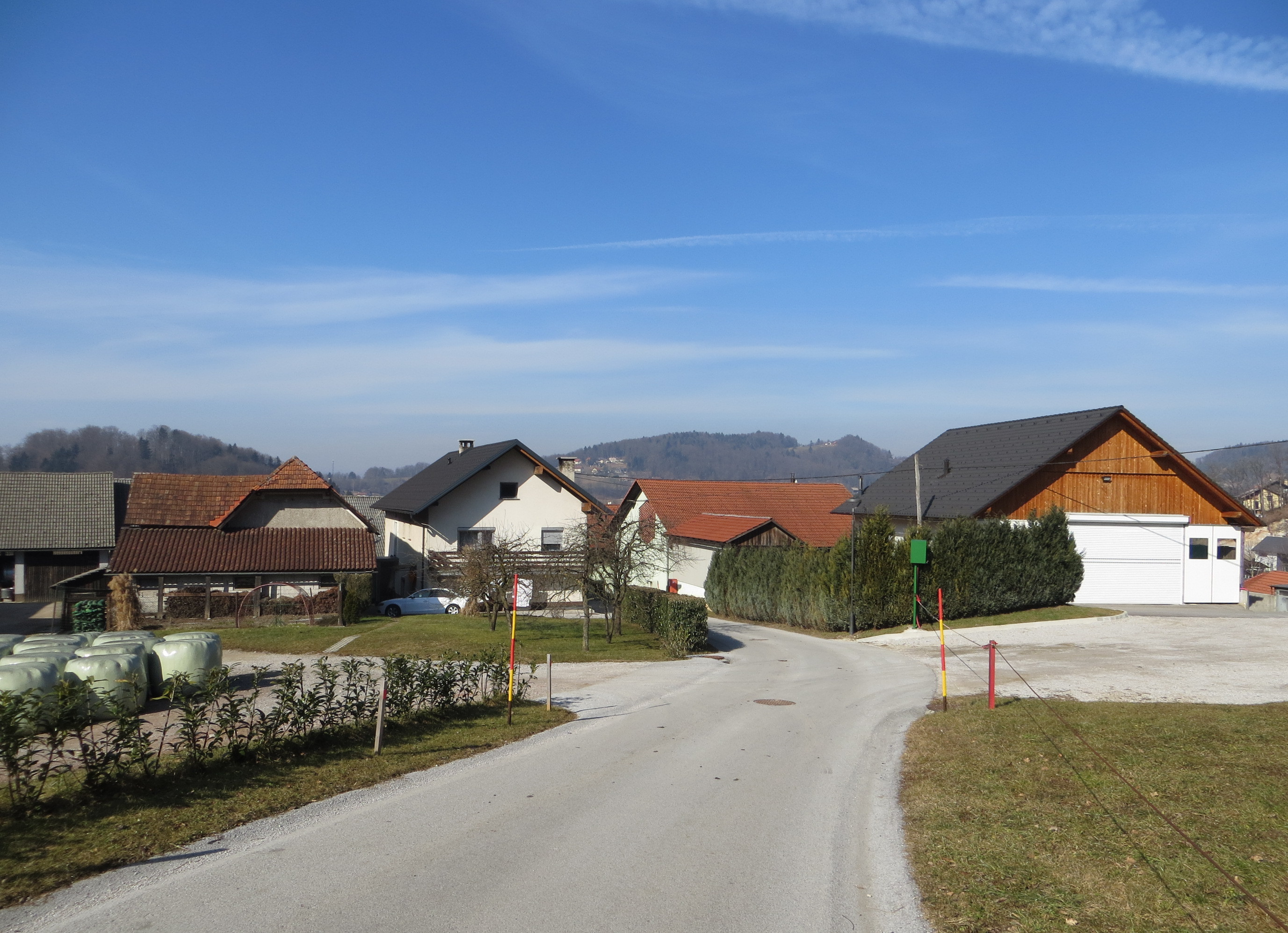

- Location in Slovenia
- Coordinates: 45°58′50.7″N 14°35′42.44″E
- Country: Slovenia
- Traditional region: Lower Carniola
- Statistical region: Central Slovenia
- Municipality: Grosuplje

Area
  - Total: 0.75 km^{2} (0.29 sq mi)
- Elevation: 300.9 m (987 ft)

Population (2002)
  - Total: 123

Tlake (pronounced [ˈtlaːkɛ]) is a settlement in the Municipality of Grosuplje in central Slovenia. It lies west of Šmarje–Sap on the road to Škofljica. The area is part of the historical region of Lower Carniola. The municipality is now included in the Central Slovenia Statistical Region. The settlement consists of two parts: Spodnje Tlake and Zgornje Tlake (literally, 'lower Tlake' and 'upper Tlake').

== Name ==
Tlake was attested in written sources in 1436 as Tlakach. The name Tlake is derived from the Slovene common noun tlaka, originally referring to voluntary collective labor, and later to corvée under feudalism. It refers to a place where collective labor was performed. Because places with this name generally do not lie near old Roman roads, the suggestion that the name is derived from tlak 'pavement' is unlikely. Zgornje Tlake was formerly known as Sveti Križ (literally, 'Holy Cross') after the local church, now located in Šmarje–Sap.

== History ==
Tlake was burned by Italian forces on 26 October 1941 in retaliation for a Partisan attack on a bunker next to the railroad tunnel.
