= Gornja Bistrica =

- Location in Slovenia
- Coordinates: 46°33′12.32″N 16°15′54.12″E
- Country: Slovenia
- Traditional region: Prekmurje
- Statistical region: Mura
- Municipality: Črenšovci

Area
  - Total: 6.7 km^{2} (2.6 sq mi)
- Elevation: 172.5 m (566 ft)

Population (2020)
  - Total: 756
  - Density: 110/km^{2} (290/sq mi)

Gornja Bistrica (pronounced [ˈɡoːɾnja ˈbiːstɾitsa]; Hungarian: Felsőbeszterce) is a village on the left bank of the Mura River in the Municipality of Črenšovci in the Prekmurje region of northeastern Slovenia.
