= Tenetiše, Kranj =

Tenetiše
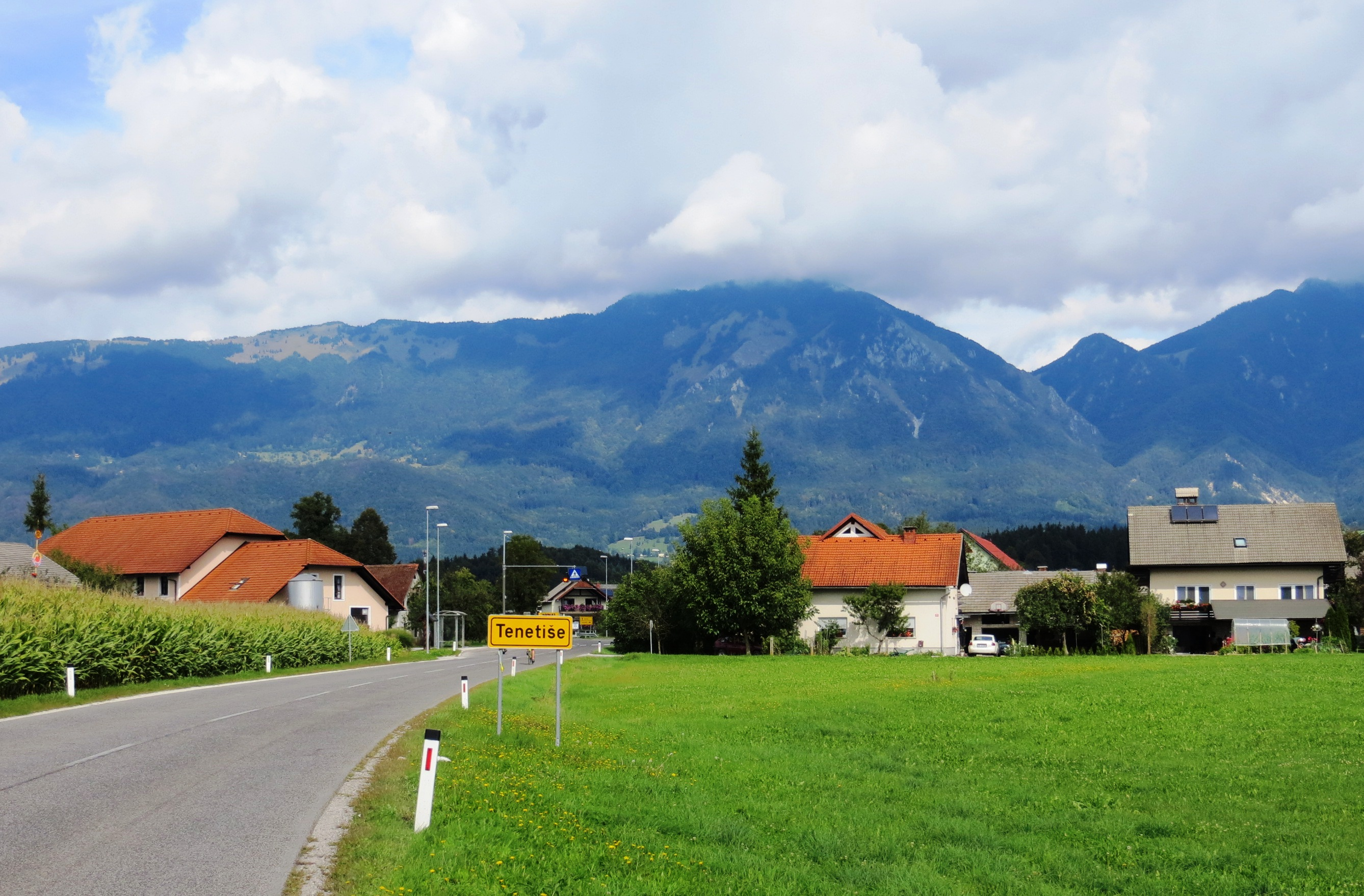

- Location in Slovenia
- Coordinates: 46°17′29.91″N 14°20′49.29″E
- Country: Slovenia
- Traditional region: Upper Carniola
- Statistical region: Upper Carniola
- Municipality: Kranj

Area
  - Total: 7.43 km^{2} (2.87 sq mi)
- Elevation: 416.2 m (1,365 ft)

Population (2002)
  - Total: 386

Tenetiše (pronounced [tɛnɛˈtiːʃɛ]; German: Tenetische) is a village in the Municipality of Kranj in the Upper Carniola region of Slovenia. It includes the hamlets of Spodnje Tenetiše and Zgornje Tenetiše, formerly separate villages.

== Name ==
Tenetiše was first attested in written sources in 1322 as Tenetsach (and as Tenetischczs in 1345 and Tenetischcz in 1374). The name Tenetišče (a feminine plural noun) is derived from the earlier plural demonym *Tenetiščane, meaning 'residents of Tenetišče' (a neuter singular noun). This, in turn, is derived from the common noun *teneto or *tenetъ 'hunting net', and may refer to a hunting area where small game or birds were caught using nets. Tenetiše was known as Tenetische in German in the past.

== Church ==
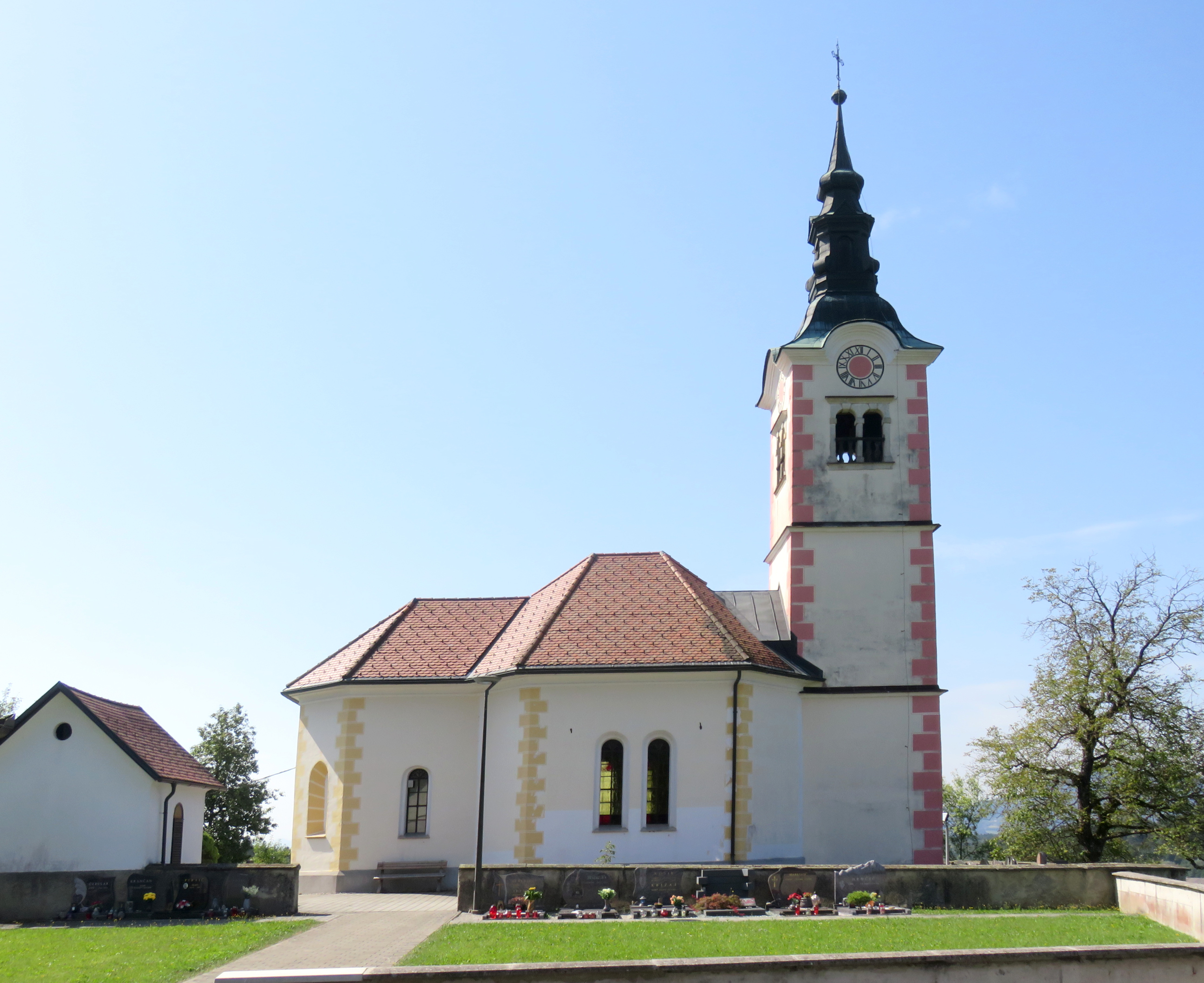
Saint Dominic's Church

The local church is dedicated to Saint Dominic and belongs to the Parish of Trstenik.

== Gallery ==
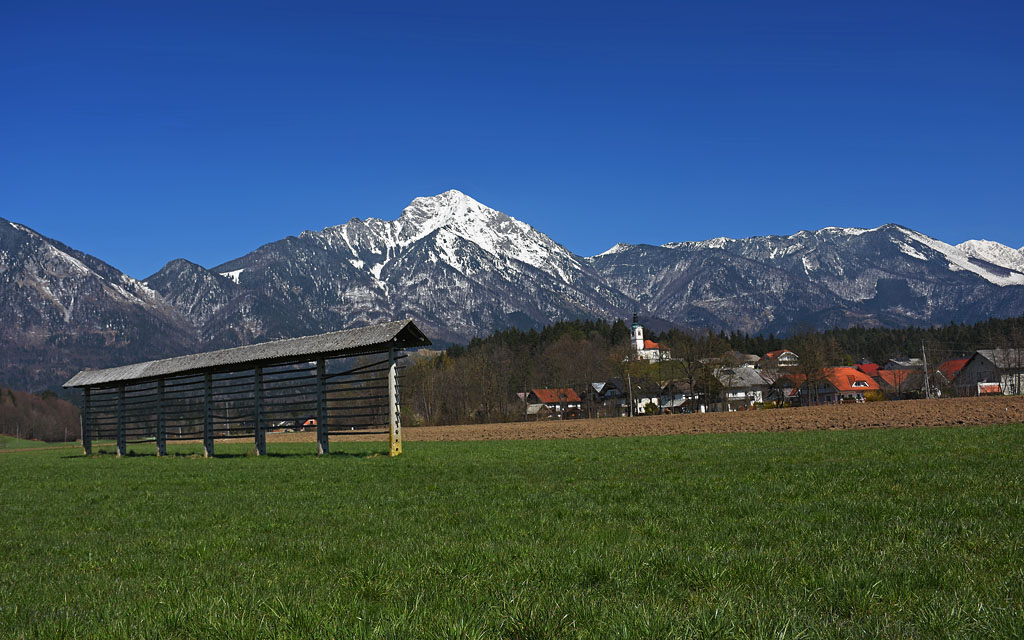
Tenetiše with Mount Storžič in the background
