= Črenšovci =

Črenšovci Črensovci, Čerensovci
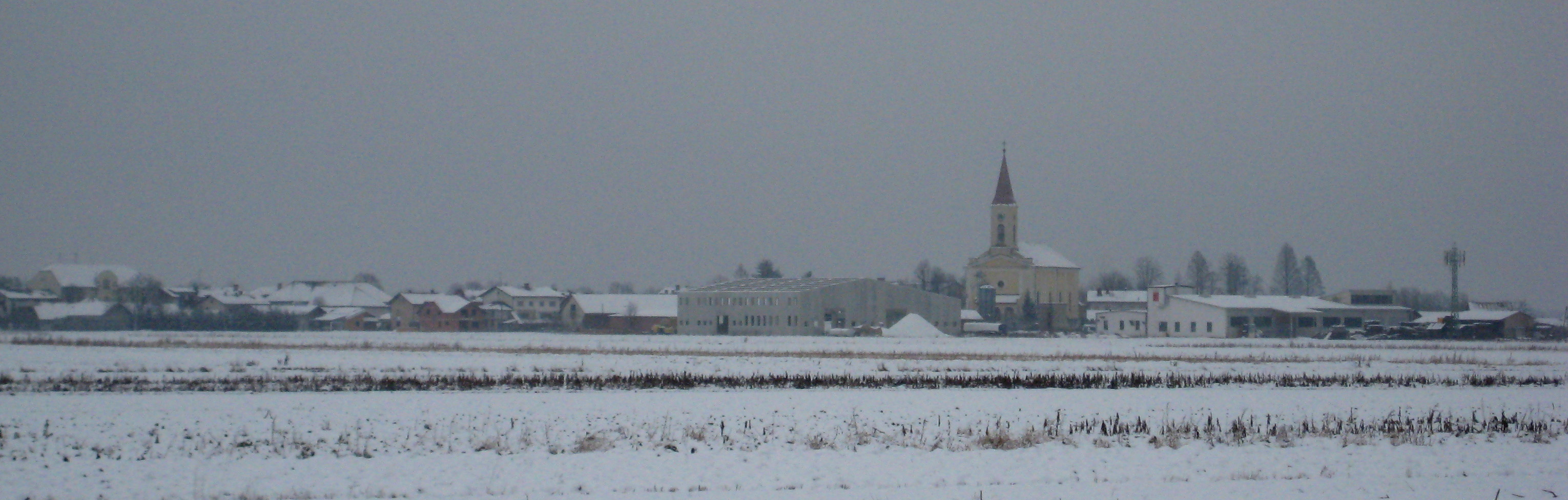
- Panoramic view of Črenšovci

- Location in Slovenia
- Coordinates: 46°34′28.9″N 16°17′37.35″E
- Country: Slovenia
- Traditional region: Prekmurje
- Statistical region: Mura
- Municipality: Črenšovci

Area
  - Total: 10.0 km^{2} (3.9 sq mi)
- Elevation: 170.4 m (559 ft)

Population (2020)
  - Total: 1,151
  - Density: 115/km^{2} (298/sq mi)
- Postal code: 9232 Črenšovci

Črenšovci (pronounced [ˈtʃɾeːnʃɔu̯tsi]; Hungarian: Cserföld, Prekmurje Slovene: Črensovci or Čerensovci) is a settlement in the Prekmurje region in northeastern Slovenia. It is the seat of the Municipality of Črenšovci. Črnec Creek, a tributary of the Ledava, flows past the settlement.

The parish church in Črenšovci is dedicated to the Holy Cross and belongs to the Roman Catholic Diocese of Murska Sobota. It was built in 1860 on the site of an earlier church originating from the early 14th century.

== Notable people ==
Notable people that were born or lived in Črenšovci include:

- Jakab Szabár (1802/3–1863), priest and writer
- Vilmos Tkálecz (1894–19??), schoolmaster and politician

== Biography ==
- Zver, Nina (2023). Govor treh Bistric v Prekmurju. Slavia Centralis 16(2). Maribor: Filozofska fakulteta, Oddelek za slovanske jezike in književnosti. pp. 66–90.
