= Tabor, Sežana =

Tabor
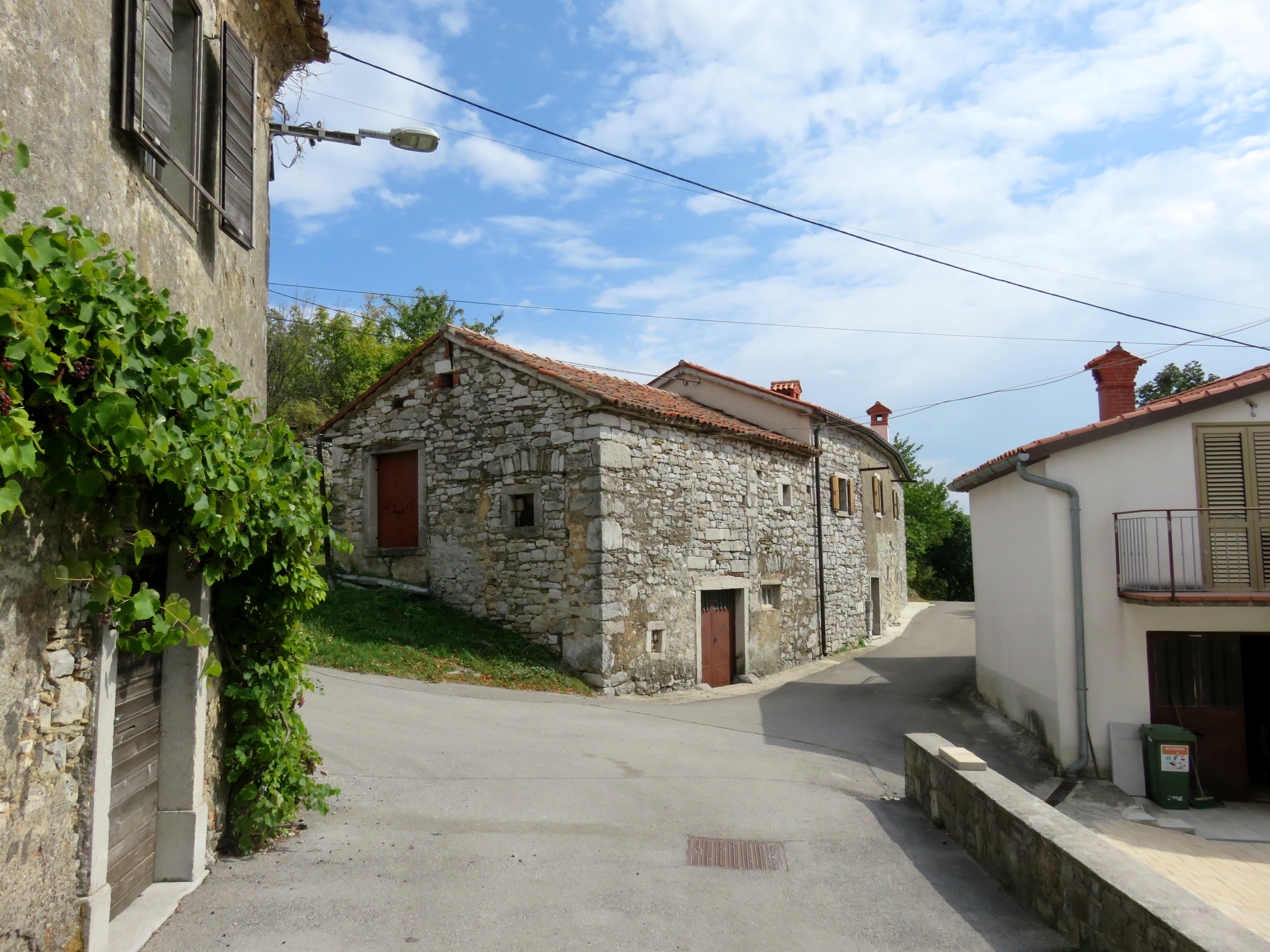

- Location in Slovenia
- Coordinates: 45°46′4.68″N 13°57′25.72″E
- Country: Slovenia
- Traditional region: Littoral
- Statistical region: Coastal–Karst
- Municipality: Sežana

Area
  - Total: 0.68 km^{2} (0.26 sq mi)
- Elevation: 595.7 m (1,954 ft)

Population (2002)
  - Total: 4

Tabor (pronounced [ˈtaːbɔɾ]) is a small village in the Municipality of Sežana in the Littoral region of Slovenia.

== Church ==
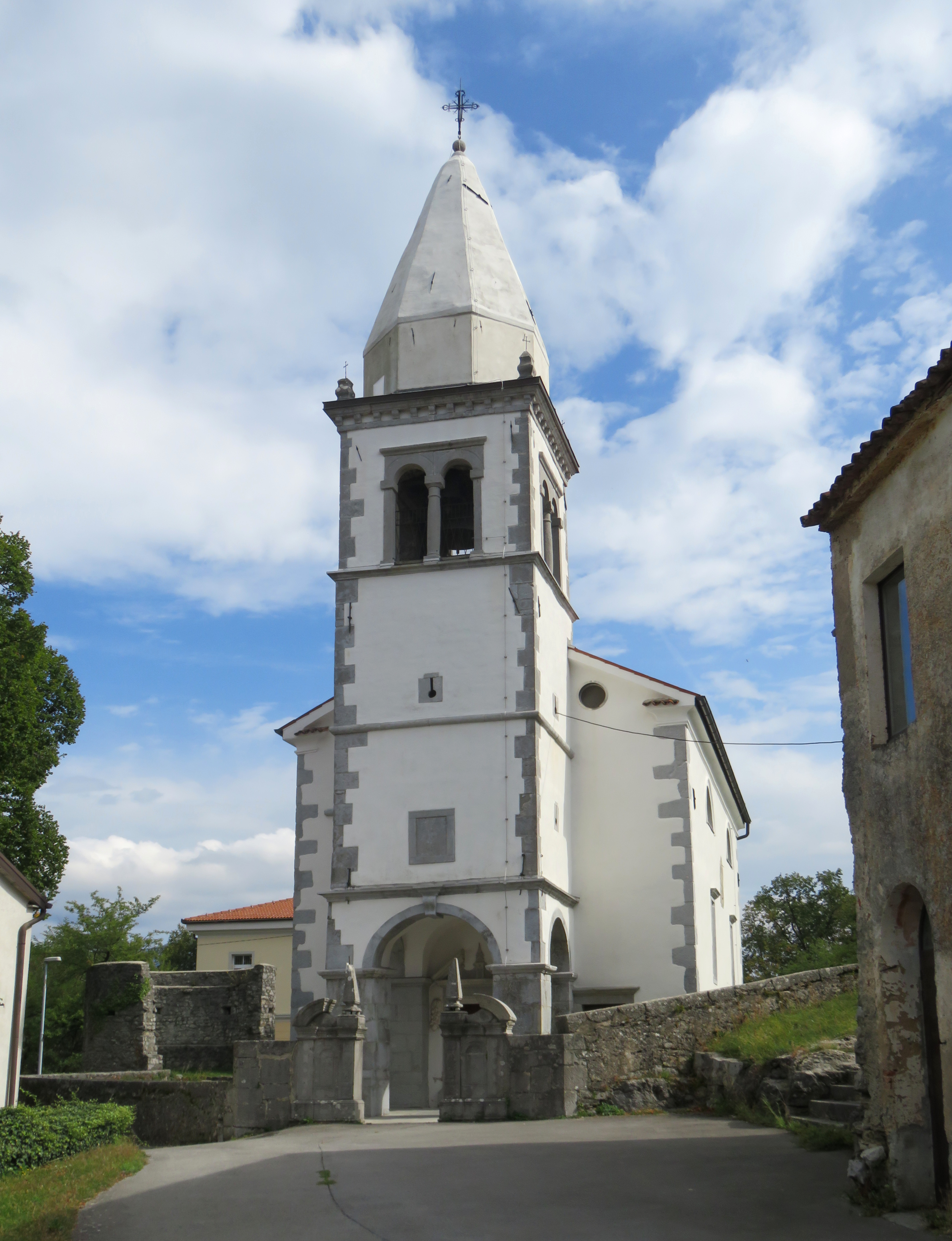
Presentation Church

The parish church in Tabor is dedicated to the Presentation of Jesus Christ at the Temple and belongs to the Parish of Vrabče.
