= Fran Gerbič =

Slovenian composer and operatic tenor

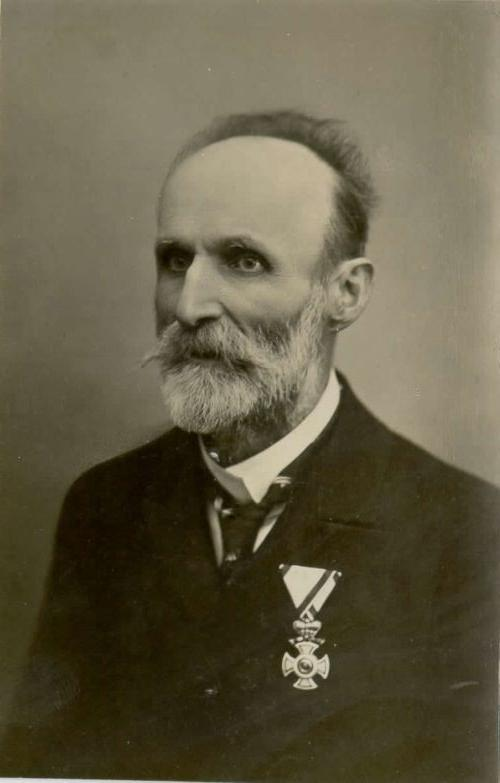
Fran Gerbič

Fran Gerbič (5 October 1840, Cerknica – 29 March 1917, Ljubljana) was a Slovenian composer and operatic tenor.

Gerbič was born in Cerknica and entered a normal school in 1856, where his instructors included Kamilo Mašek. He was assigned to a teaching position in Trnovo (now part of Ilirska Bistrica), where he also served as organist and composed his first works.

During the 1940s Gerbič was one of the best-known composers of Yugoslavia abroad.

His daughter was Jarmila Gerbič (1877–1964), Slovenian soprano, opera singer and music teacher.

== Works ==
Operas

- Kres (Midsummer) 1896
- Nabor 1913

Songs

- Kam? (Where?)
- Pojdem na prejo (I'll Watch the Girls Spinning)
- V noči (In the Night)
