= Tolsti Vrh, Litija =

Tolsti Vrh
- Location in Slovenia
- Coordinates: 46°6′26.44″N 14°49′37.83″E
- Country: Slovenia
- Traditional region: Upper Carniola
- Statistical region: Central Sava
- Municipality: Litija

Area
  - Total: 0.97 km^{2} (0.37 sq mi)
- Elevation: 444.1 m (1,457 ft)
- Postal code: 1252

Tolsti Vrh (pronounced [ˈtoːu̯sti ˈʋəɾx]) is a small settlement in the hills south of Vače in the Municipality of Litija in central Slovenia. The area is part of the traditional region of Upper Carniola and is now included with the rest of the municipality in the Central Sava Statistical Region.

== History ==
Tolsti Vrh was a hamlet of Mala Sela until 1995, when it became a separate settlement.
