= Tlaka, Litija =

Tlaka
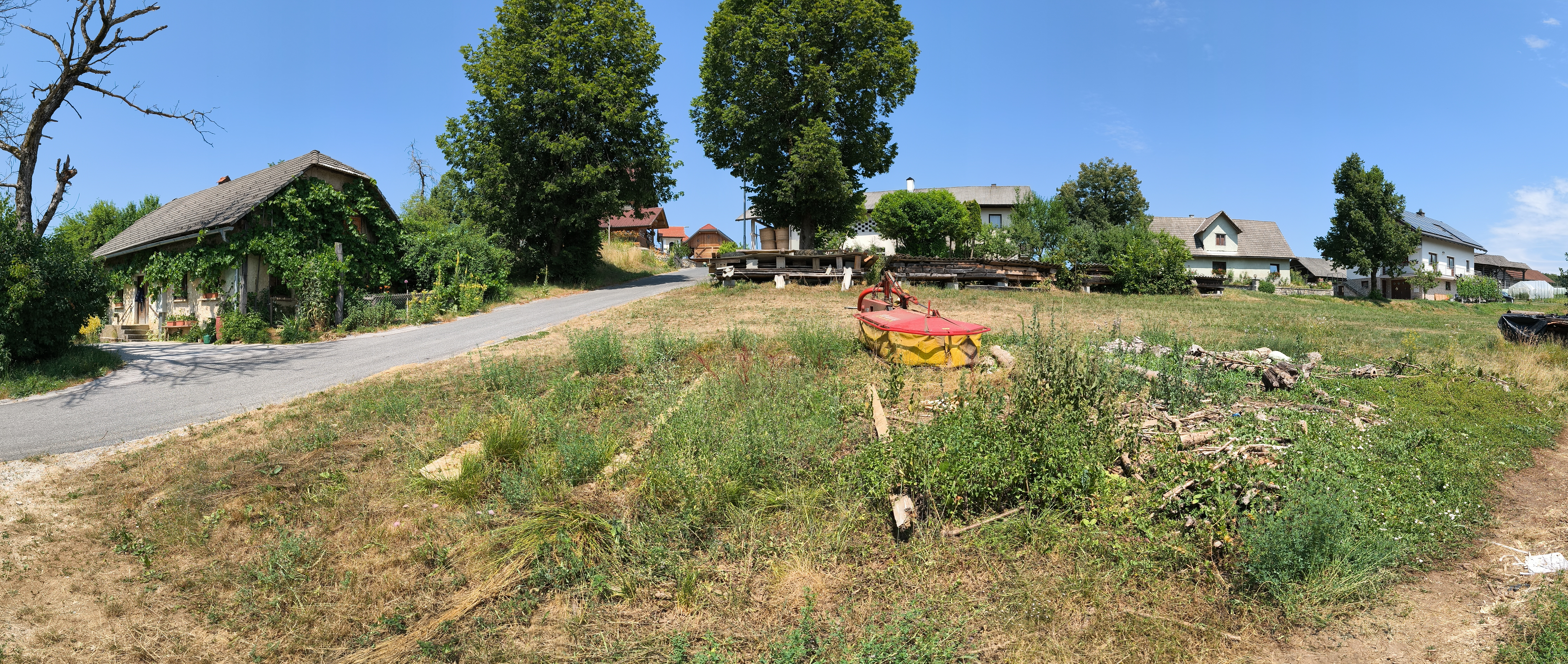

- Location in Slovenia
- Coordinates: 45°58′49.05″N 14°59′11.66″E
- Country: Slovenia
- Traditional region: Lower Carniola
- Statistical region: Central Sava
- Municipality: Litija

Area
  - Total: 1.72 km^{2} (0.66 sq mi)
- Elevation: 377.9 m (1,240 ft)

Population (2002)
  - Total: 33
- Postal code: 1274

Tlaka (pronounced [ˈtlaːka]) is a settlement south of Gabrovka in the Municipality of Litija in central Slovenia. The area is part of the traditional region of Lower Carniola and is now included with the rest of the municipality in the Central Sava Statistical Region.

== Name ==
Tlaka was attested in written sources as Prait in 1360, Ober Praӱtt in 1498, and Natlakach in 1505, among other names. The name Tlaka is derived from the Slovene common noun tlaka, originally referring to voluntary collective labor, and later to corvée under feudalism. It refers to a place where collective labor was performed. Because places with this name generally do not lie near old Roman roads, the suggestion that the name is derived from tlak 'pavement' is unlikely.

== History ==
Traces of a late Bronze Age settlement have been found in the area. The residents of the settlement were once serfs of Turn Manor northwest of the village.

== Notable people ==
Notable people that were born or lived in Tlaka include:

- Anton Pevc (1885–1967), dairy and livestock expert
