= Trnje, Črenšovci =

Trnje
- Location in Slovenia
- Coordinates: 46°35′12.13″N 16°18′34.62″E
- Country: Slovenia
- Traditional region: Prekmurje
- Statistical region: Mura
- Municipality: Črenšovci

Area
  - Total: 4.04 km^{2} (1.56 sq mi)
- Elevation: 168.1 m (552 ft)

Population (2020)
  - Total: 544
  - Density: 135/km^{2} (349/sq mi)

Trnje (pronounced [ˈtəɾnjɛ]; Hungarian: Tüskeszer) is a village in the Municipality of Črenšovci in the Prekmurje region of northeastern Slovenia. Črnec Creek, a tributary of the Ledava, flows through the settlement.
