= Dolnja Bistrica =

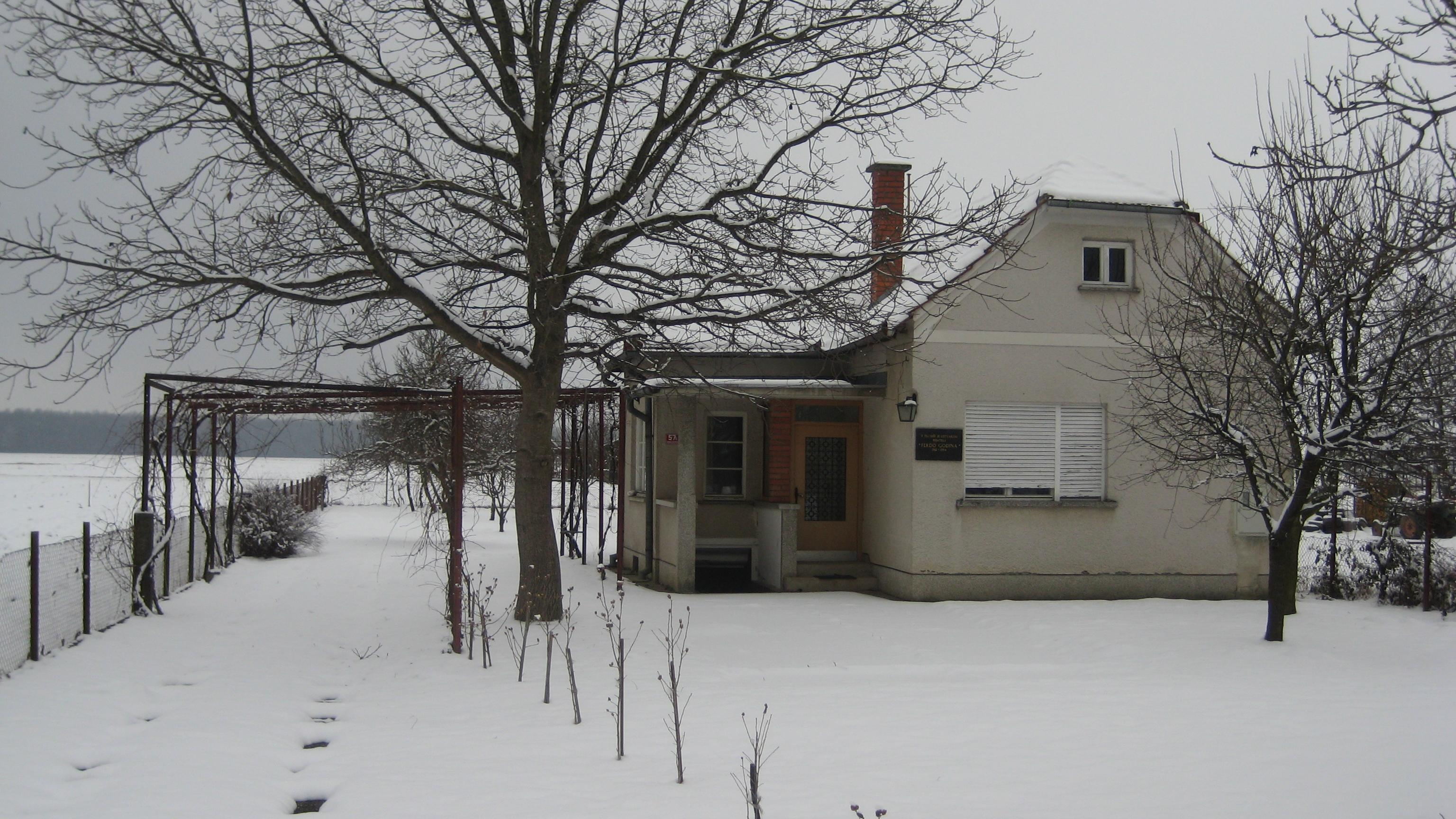

- Location in Slovenia
- Coordinates: 46°32′14.57″N 16°17′34.82″E
- Country: Slovenia
- Traditional region: Prekmurje
- Statistical region: Mura
- Municipality: Črenšovci

Area
  - Total: 6.89 km^{2} (2.66 sq mi)
- Elevation: 169.7 m (557 ft)

Population (2020)
  - Total: 531
  - Density: 77.1/km^{2} (200/sq mi)

Dolnja Bistrica (pronounced [ˈdoːlnja ˈbiːstɾitsa]; Hungarian: Alsóbeszterce) is a village in the Municipality of Črenšovci in the Prekmurje region of northeastern Slovenia.
