= Breg pri Litiji =

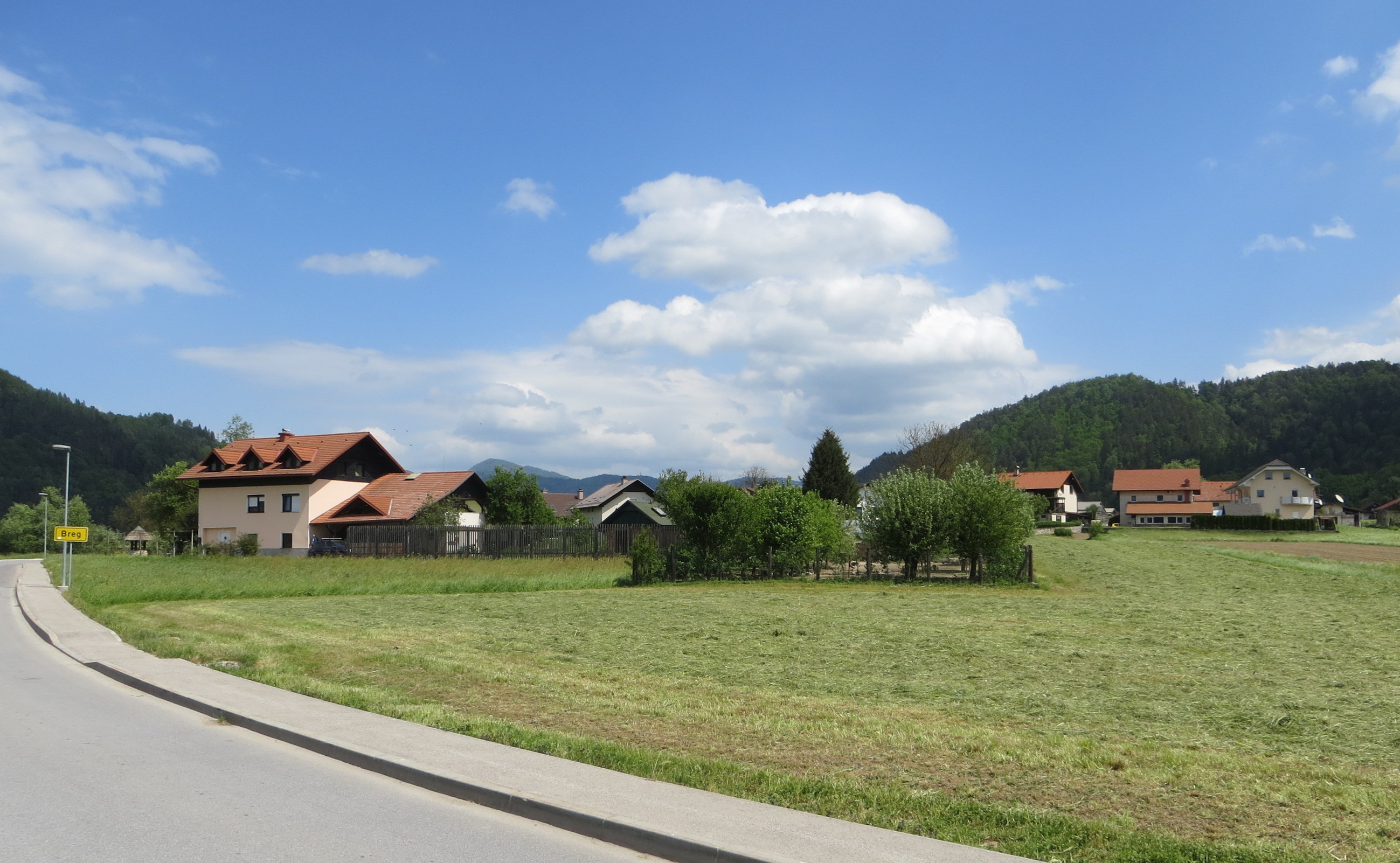

- Location in Slovenia
- Coordinates: 46°3′50.93″N 14°51′5.79″E
- Country: Slovenia
- Traditional region: Lower Carniola
- Statistical region: Central Sava
- Municipality: Litija

Area
  - Total: 0.88 km^{2} (0.34 sq mi)
- Elevation: 237.7 m (780 ft)

Population (2002)
  - Total: 196
- Postal code: 1270

Breg pri Litiji (pronounced [ˈbɾeːk pɾi liˈtiːji]; German: Rann) is a settlement on the right bank of the Sava River in the Municipality of Litija in central Slovenia. The area is part of the traditional region of Lower Carniola. It is now included with the rest of the municipality in the Central Sava Statistical Region; until January 2014 the municipality was part of the Central Slovenia Statistical Region.

== Name ==
Breg pri Litiji was attested in written sources as Rein in 1444. The name of the settlement was changed from Breg to Breg pri Litiji in 1953. In the past the German name was Rann.

== Church ==
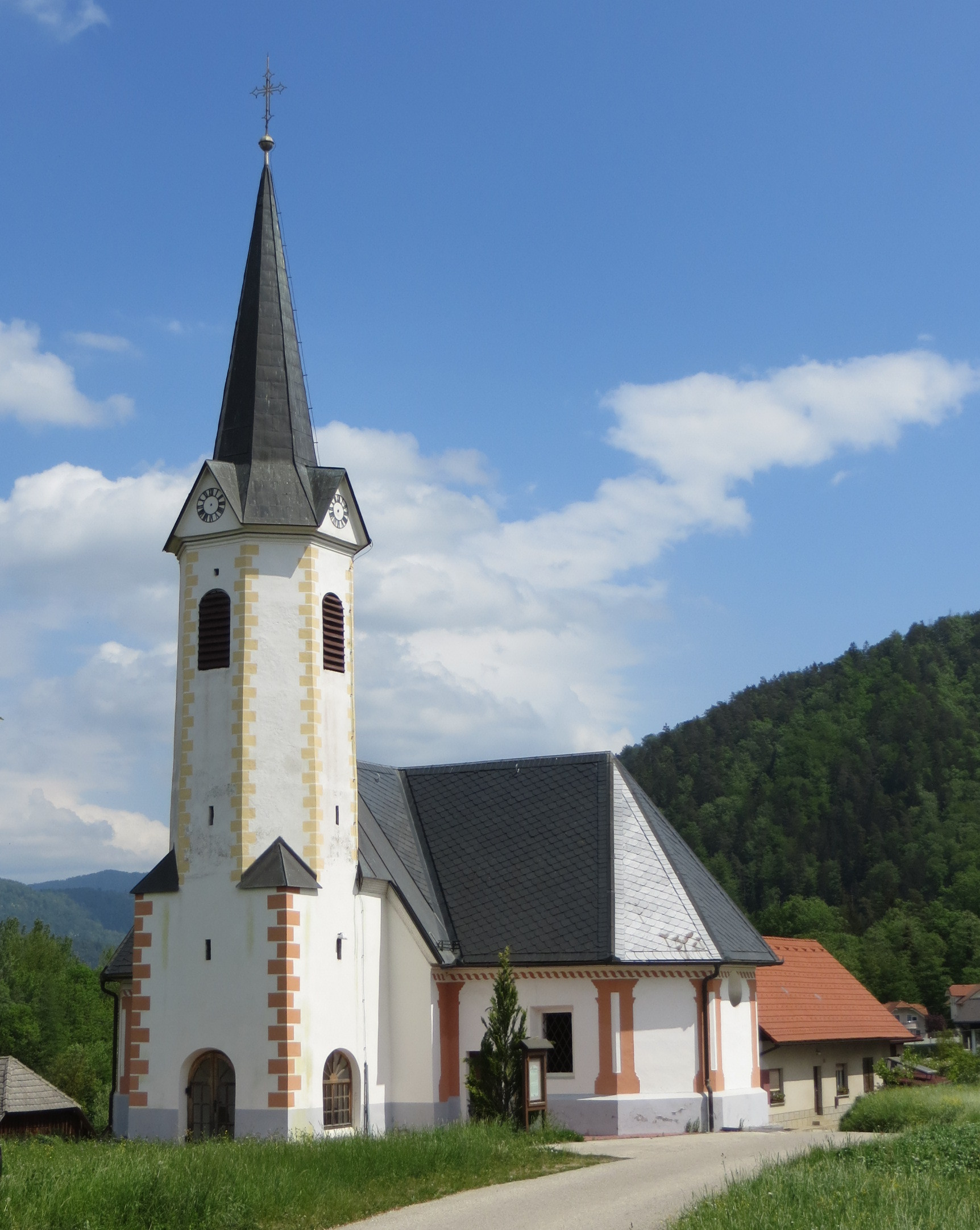
Saint Catherine's Church

The local church is dedicated to Saint Catherine and has belonged to the Parish of Litija since 1936; it previously belonged to the Parish of Šmartno. It was a 16th-century Gothic building that was restyled in the Baroque in the 18th century. The church was originally dedicated to Saints Cosmas and Damian and was a pilgrimage church for people invoking their help against disease. The date of its rededication to Saint Catherine is unknown. The main altar is dedicated to Saint Catherine, and the side altars are dedicated to Saint John of Nepomuk and Saint Francis Xavier.
