= Vrabče =

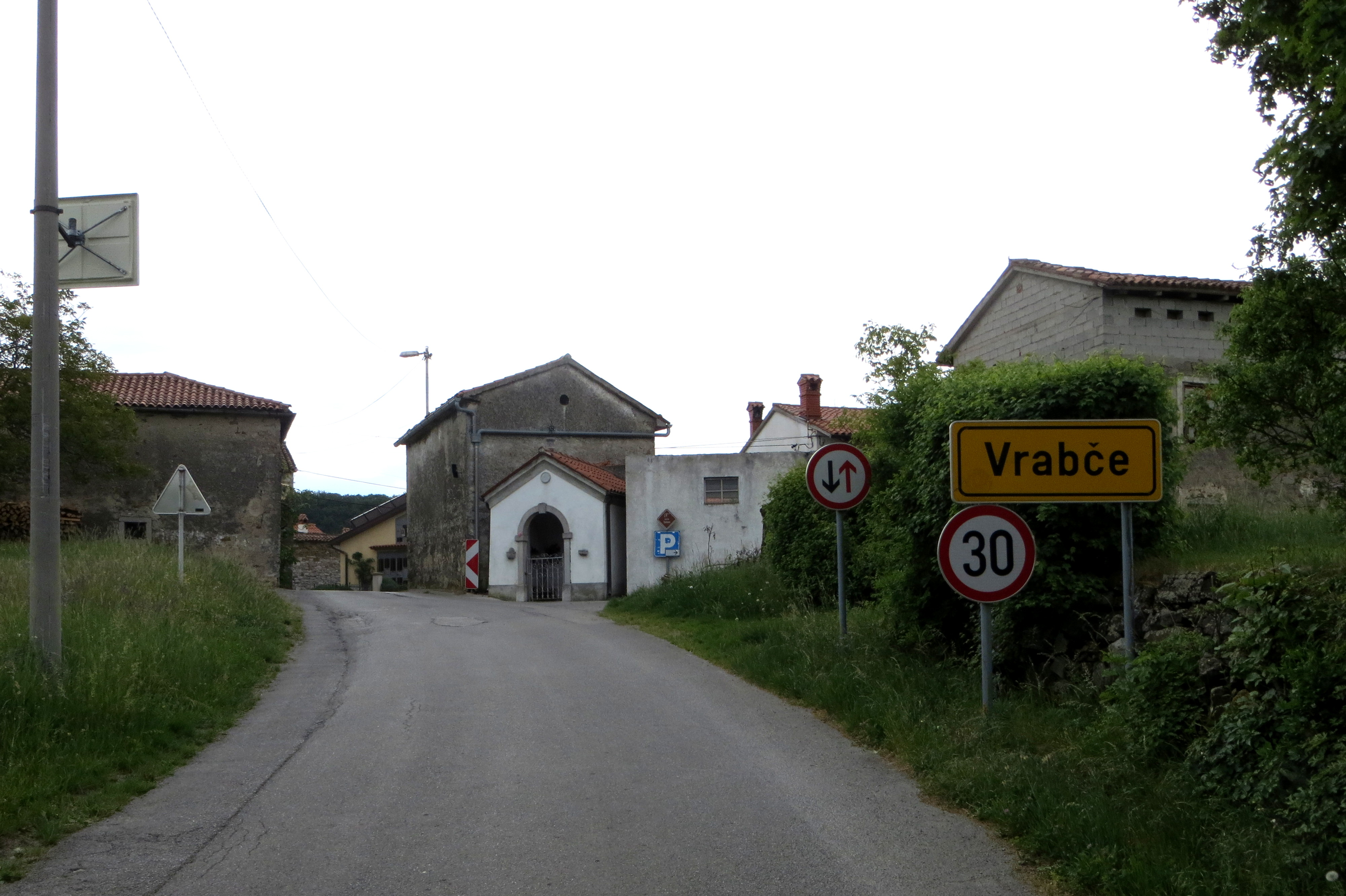

- Location in Slovenia
- Coordinates: 45°46′26.5″N 13°57′38.74″E
- Country: Slovenia
- Traditional region: Littoral
- Statistical region: Coastal–Karst
- Municipality: Sežana

Area
  - Total: 4.89 km^{2} (1.89 sq mi)
- Elevation: 512 m (1,680 ft)

Population (2002)
  - Total: 58

Vrabče (pronounced [ˈwɾaːptʃɛ]; Italian: Monte Urabice) is a village in the Municipality of Sežana in the traditional Inner Carniola region of Slovenia. It is now generally regarded as part of the Slovenian Littoral.
