= Trnovče, Lukovica =

Trnovče
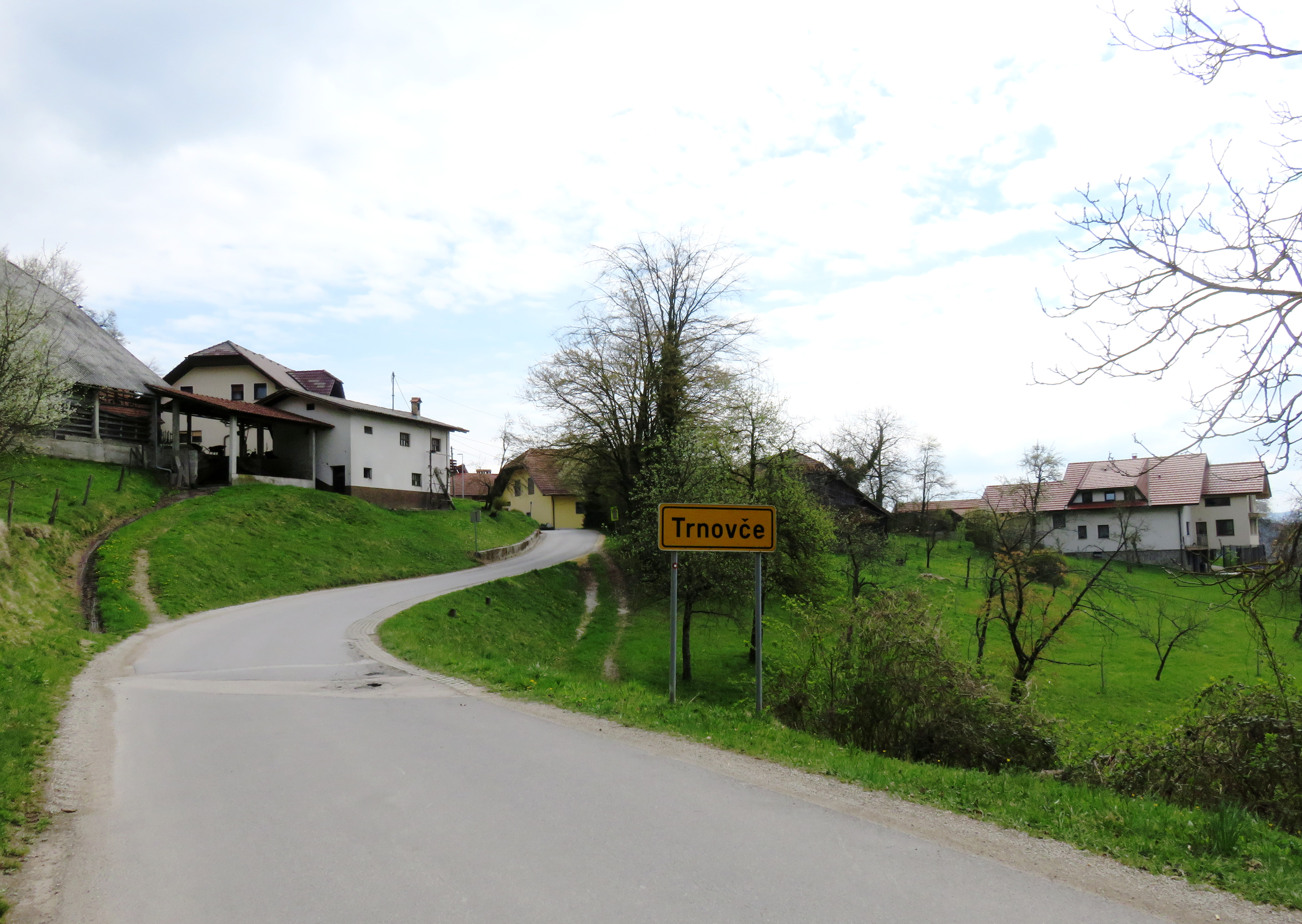

- Location in Slovenia
- Coordinates: 46°11′25.07″N 14°42′41.36″E
- Country: Slovenia
- Traditional region: Upper Carniola
- Statistical region: Central Slovenia
- Municipality: Lukovica

Area
  - Total: 1.4 km^{2} (0.54 sq mi)
- Elevation: 543.3 m (1,782 ft)

Population (2002)
  - Total: 45

Trnovče (pronounced [təɾˈnoːu̯tʃɛ]; German: Ternoutsche) is a dispersed settlement in the hills northeast of Lukovica pri Domžalah in the eastern part of the Upper Carniola region of Slovenia.
