= Tržišče, Rogaška Slatina =

Tržišče
- Location in Slovenia
- Coordinates: 46°13′43.18″N 15°39′52.85″E
- Country: Slovenia
- Traditional region: Styria
- Statistical region: Savinja
- Municipality: Rogaška Slatina

Area
  - Total: 1.29 km^{2} (0.50 sq mi)
- Elevation: 227.3 m (746 ft)

Population (2002)
  - Total: 172

Tržišče (pronounced [təɾˈʒiːʃtʃɛ]) is a settlement in the Municipality of Rogaška Slatina in eastern Slovenia, right on the border with Croatia. The wider area around Rogaška Slatina is part of the traditional region of Styria. It is now included in the Savinja Statistical Region.
