= Trstenik, Kranj =

Trstenik
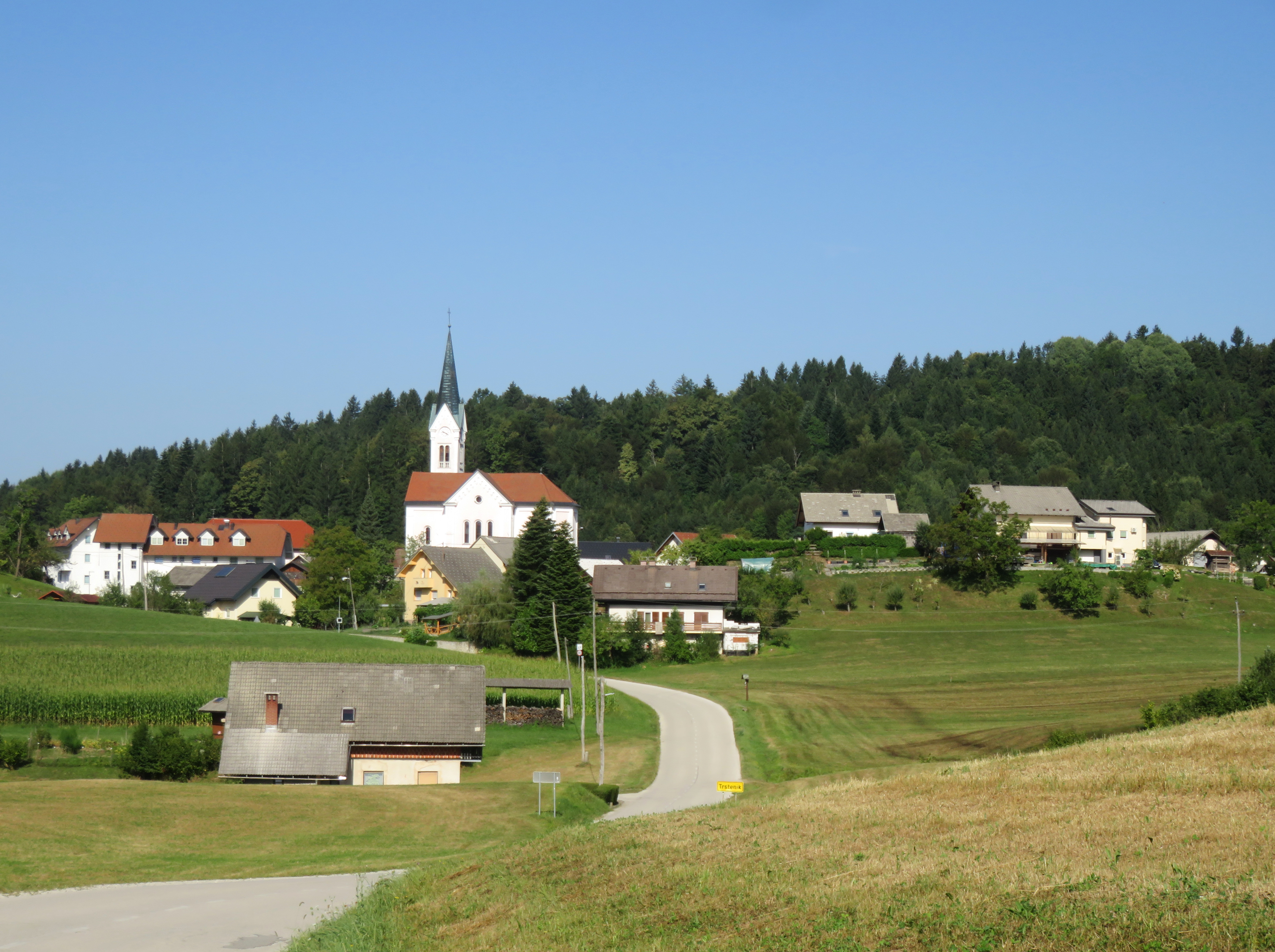

- Location in Slovenia
- Coordinates: 46°19′7.2″N 14°22′3.07″E
- Country: Slovenia
- Traditional region: Upper Carniola
- Statistical region: Upper Carniola
- Municipality: Kranj

Area
  - Total: 1.29 km^{2} (0.50 sq mi)
- Elevation: 510.6 m (1,675 ft)

Population (2002)
  - Total: 307

Trstenik (pronounced [təɾstɛˈniːk]) is a village in the hills north of Kranj in the Upper Carniola region of Slovenia.

The parish church in the settlement is dedicated to Saint Martin.
