= Senica (disambiguation) =

Senica is a town in Slovakia.

Senica may also refer to:

- Marija Senica, Serbian synchronized swimmer
- Mike Senica (born 1966), American racing driver and professional wrestler
- FK Senica, Slovak football club
- Senica District, Slovak administrative division
- Senica Airport, in Slovakia
- Spodnja Senica, a village in Slovenia
- Zgornja Senica, a village in Slovenia
