= Govejek =

Govejek may refer to the following places in Slovenia:

- Govejk, a settlement in the Municipality of Idrija (known as Govejek until 1980)
- Osolnik, Medvode, a settlement in the Municipality of Medvode (known as Govejek until 1979)
- Trnovec, Medvode, a settlement in the Municipality of Medvode (which annexed part of Govejek in 1979)
