= Tehovec =

Tehovec may refer to:

- Tehovec, Czech Republic
- Tehovec, Slovenia
