= Svetje =

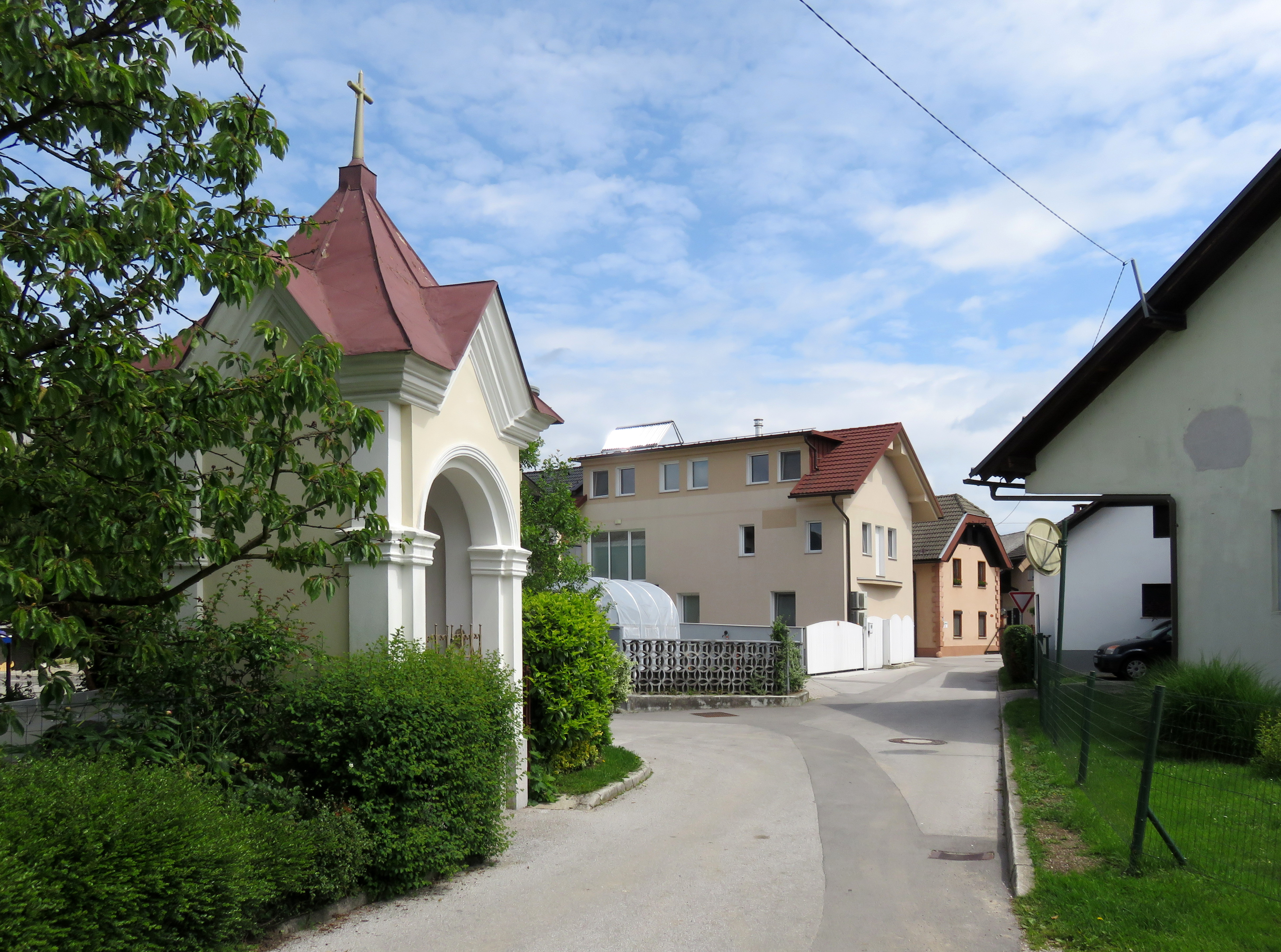

- Location in Slovenia
- Coordinates: 46°08′39″N 14°24′15″E
- Country: Slovenia
- Traditional region: Upper Carniola
- Statistical region: Central Slovenia
- Municipality: Medvode
- Elevation: 340 m (1,120 ft)

Svetje (pronounced [ˈsʋeːtjɛ], German: Swetie) is a former settlement in the Municipality of Medvode in eastern Slovenia. It is now part of the town of Medvode. The area is part of the traditional region of Upper Carniola. The municipality is now included in the Central Slovenia Statistical Region.

== Geography ==
Svetje is a clustered settlement west of the center of Medvode. It stands on a terrace on the left bank of the Sora River, above the railroad bridge over the river. The soil is loamy and becomes gravelly closer to the river.

== History ==
During the Second World War, German forces shot 25 hostages in a gravel pit in Svetje on December 13, 1943. A memorial marks the site. Svetje was annexed by Medvode in 1980, ending its existence as an independent settlement.
