= Setnica =

Setnica may refer to:

- Setnica, Poland, a settlement in the West Pomeranian Voivodeship, Poland
- Setnica, Medvode, a settlement in the Municipality of Medvode, Slovenia
- Setnica, Dobrova–Polhov Gradec, a settlement in the Municipality of Dobrova–Polhov Gradec, Slovenia
