= Sora, Medvode =

Sora
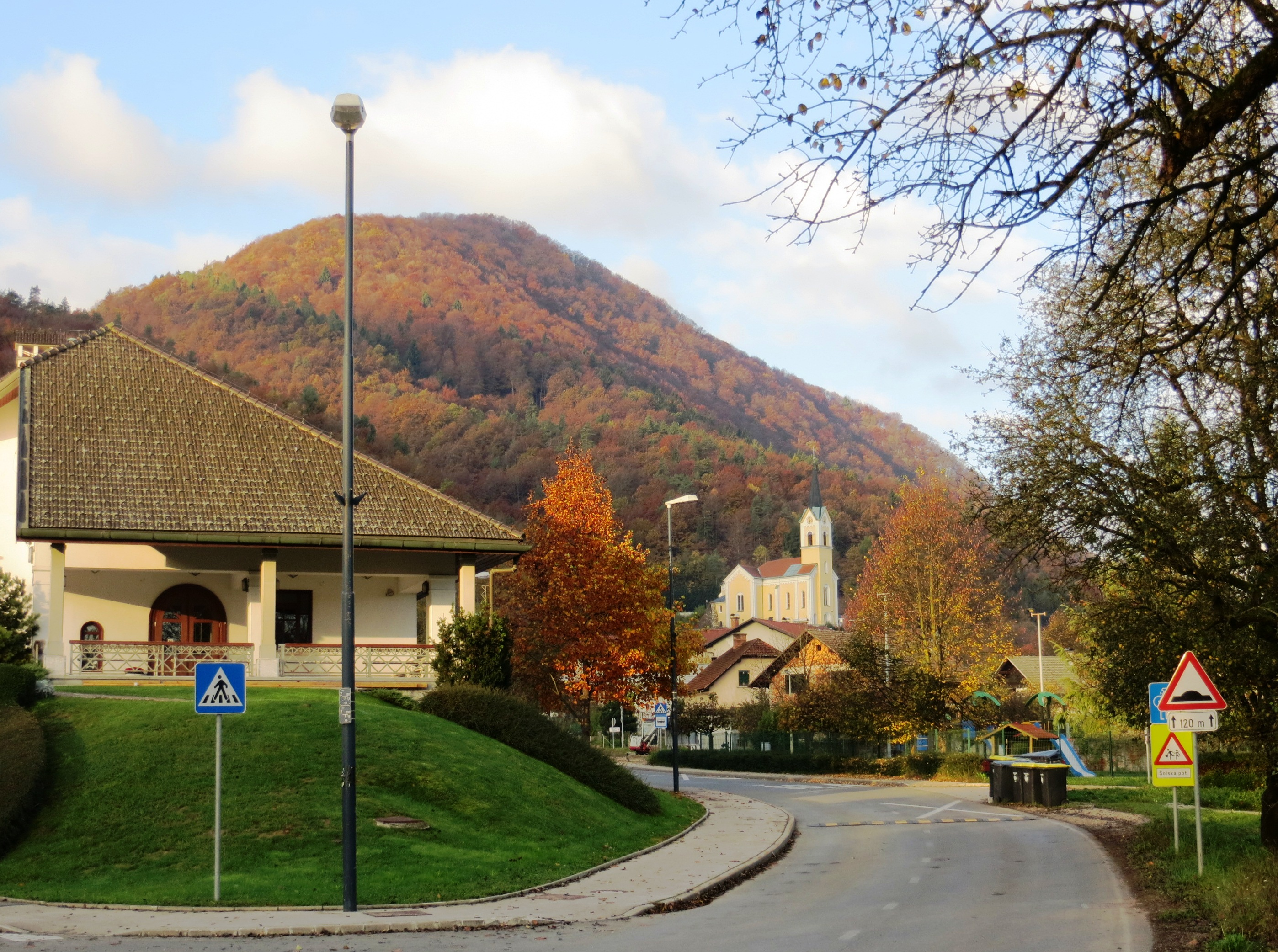

- Location in Slovenia
- Coordinates: 46°8′27.24″N 14°22′22.83″E
- Country: Slovenia
- Traditional region: Upper Carniola
- Statistical region: Central Slovenia
- Municipality: Medvode

Area
  - Total: 2.39 km^{2} (0.92 sq mi)
- Elevation: 361.2 m (1,185 ft)

Population (2002)
  - Total: 344

Sora (pronounced [ˈsoːɾa]; German: Zaier) is a village in the Municipality of Medvode in the Upper Carniola region of Slovenia. It includes the hamlets of Farjevec (or Pri Farjevcu) and Komarnija.

== Geography ==
Sora is a clustered village at the foot of Hom Hill (718 m) on an alluvial fan above Ločnica Creek, where it exits a narrow valley in the hills to the southwest. The soil is loamy and fields lie below the village, extending toward the Sora River to the north. The surrounding hills are karstified and there is a large cave on Kravjek Hill.

== Name ==
Sora was attested in written sources in 1154 as Zower (and as Ceur in 1161 and Zevra in 1252). The name is derived from the Sora River and comes from the archaic Slovene common noun sǫ̋vьra from the verb *sъ-vьrěti 'to pour out, boil over', referring to a flashy stream, and presumably turbulent confluences along the course of the river. In the past the German name was Zaier.

== History ==
The remnants of a Roman building and graves have been found between Sora and neighboring Rakovnik, attesting to early settlement in the area. A regular school was established in Sora in 1874, and the school building was remodeled in 1907. A catchment basin for water was built below the church in 1911 at the initiative of the writer Fran Saleški Finžgar. Engagements in the area during the Second World War are commemorated by a stone commemorating a fallen female Partisan along the road to Topol pri Medvodah and a monument with the names of seven fallen Partisans next to the road along Ločnica Creek. After the Second World War, the local school was named after the communist people's hero Avgust Barle. This name was removed in 1992, when the school was renamed the Sora Branch School (Slovene: Podružnična šola Sora).

== Church ==
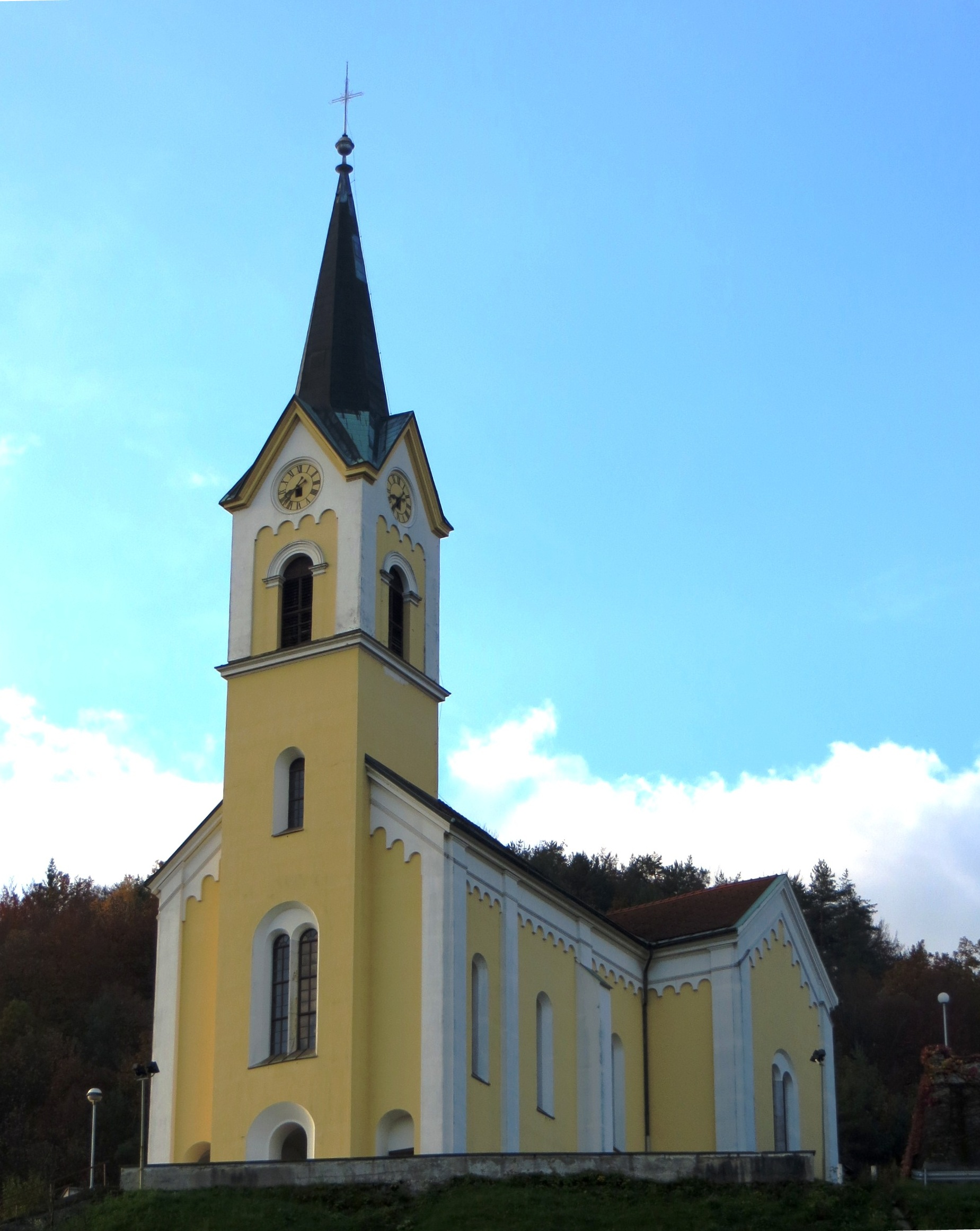
Saint Stephen's Church

The parish church in the settlement is dedicated to Saint Stephen (Slovene: sveti Štefan). A church already stood at the location in the 13th century and its parish priest was cited in a document from 1295. The church was remodeled several times, and in 1882 a new church was built in the pseudo-Gothic style. The church contains a painting of Saint Stephen by Valentin Metzinger (1699–1759).

== Notable people ==
Notable people that were born or lived in Sora include:

- Jožef Bevk (1811–1860), journalist and writer
- Fran Saleški Finžgar (1871–1962), writer
- Leopold Podlogar (1878–1925), historian
- Valentin Vodnik (1758–1819), poet
