= Osolnik, Medvode =

Osolnik Govejek (until 1979)
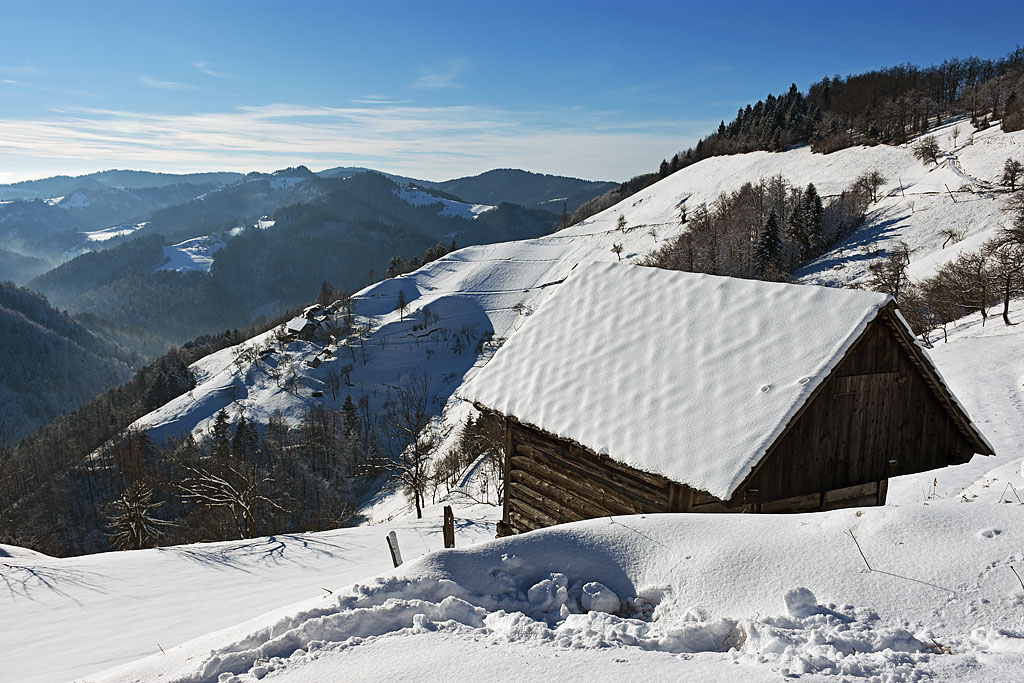

- Location in Slovenia
- Coordinates: 46°7′20.43″N 14°20′13.16″E
- Country: Slovenia
- Traditional region: Upper Carniola
- Statistical region: Central Slovenia
- Municipality: Medvode

Area
  - Total: 3.68 km^{2} (1.42 sq mi)
- Elevation: 800.5 m (2,626 ft)

Population (2002)
  - Total: 26

Osolnik (pronounced [ɔˈsoːu̯nik]) is a dispersed settlement in the Municipality of Medvode in the Upper Carniola region of Slovenia.

== History ==
The settlement was created in 1979, when part of the former settlement of Govejek was renamed Osolnik. The remainder of Govejek was annexed to the neighboring settlement of Trnovec.

== Church ==
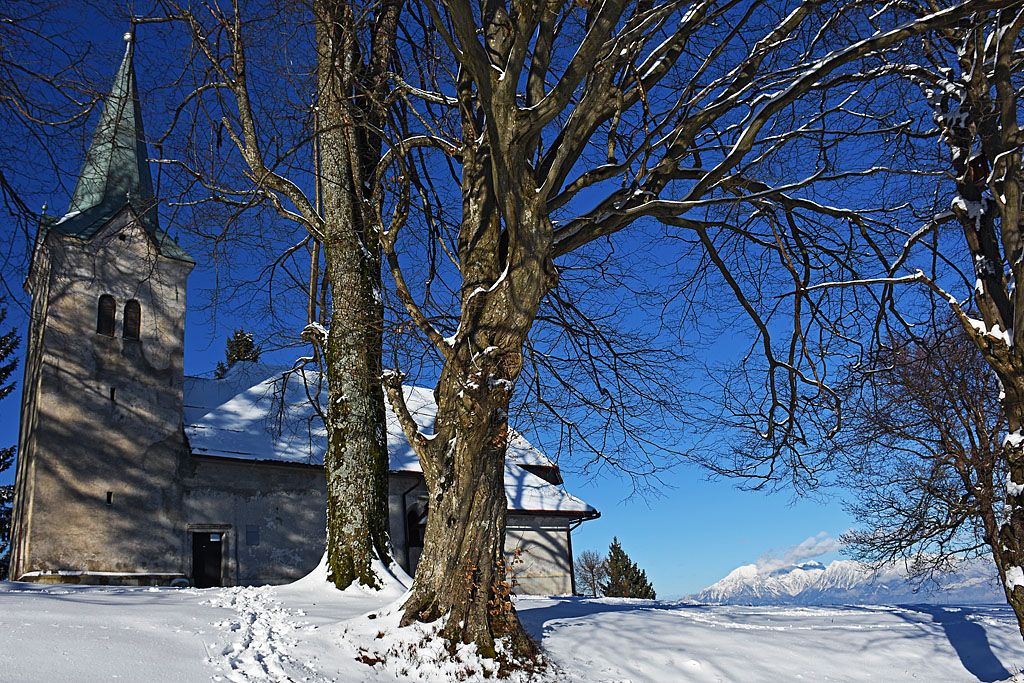
Saints Hermagoras and Fortunatus Church

The local church is built on the top of a hill above the settlement. It is dedicated to Saints Hermagoras and Fortunatus.

== Gallery ==
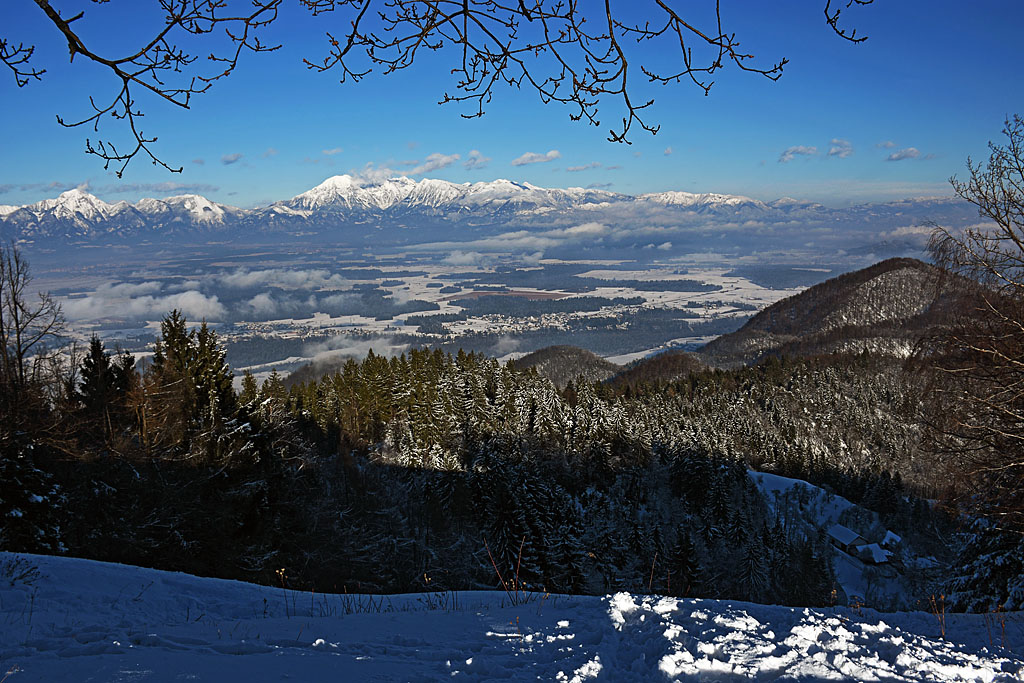
The Kamnik–Savinja Alps seen from Osolnik
