= Rakovnik, Medvode =

Rakovnik
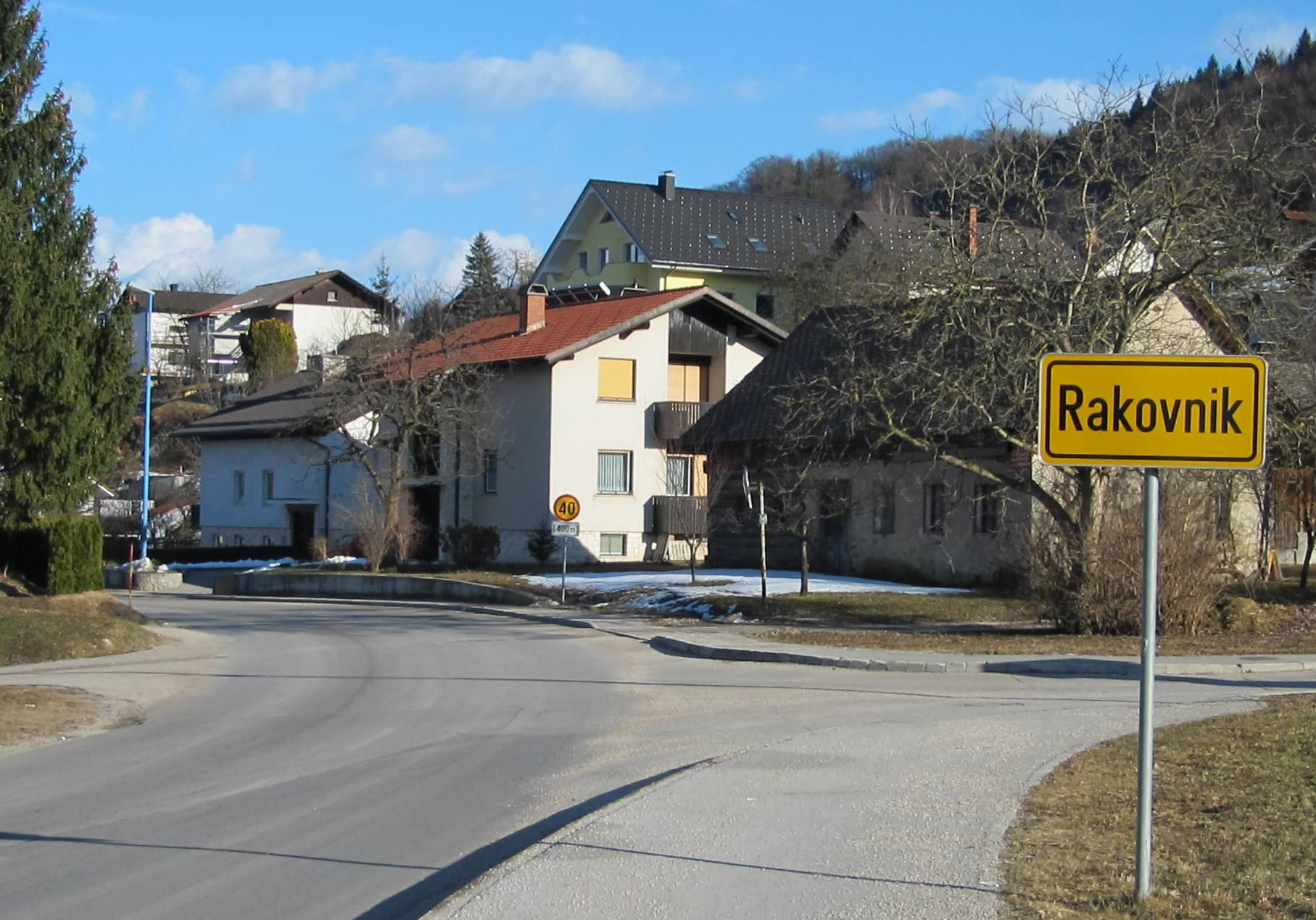
- Rakovnik

- Location in Slovenia
- Coordinates: 46°8′31.31″N 14°22′56.33″E
- Country: Slovenia
- Traditional region: Upper Carniola
- Statistical region: Central Slovenia
- Municipality: Medvode

Area
  - Total: 1.68 km^{2} (0.65 sq mi)
- Elevation: 325.5 m (1,068 ft)

Population (2002)
  - Total: 275

Rakovnik (pronounced [ˈɾaːkɔu̯nik]) is a village next to Goričane in the Municipality of Medvode in the Upper Carniola region of Slovenia.
