= Verje =

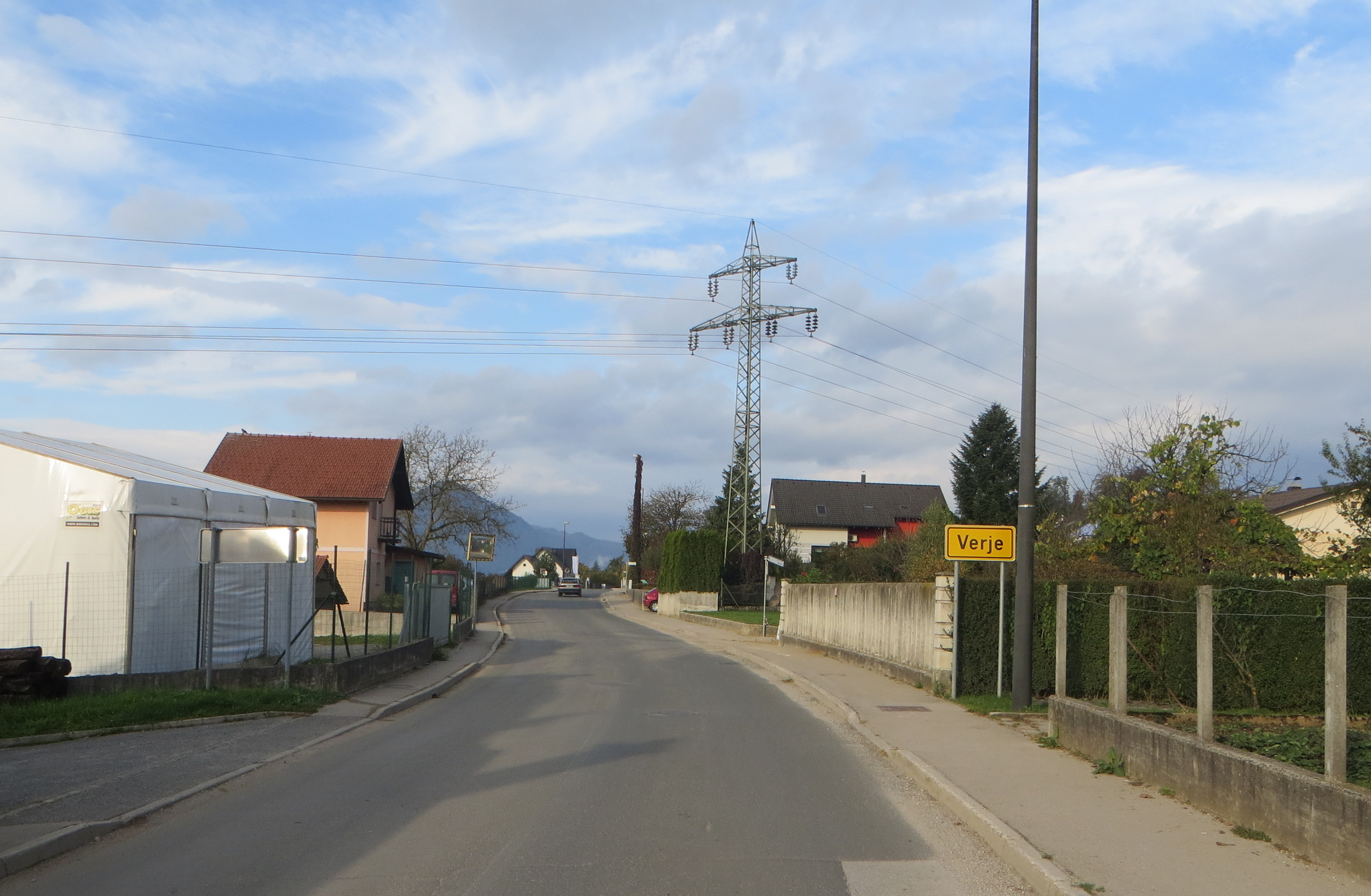

- Location in Slovenia
- Coordinates: 46°8′27.45″N 14°25′5.92″E
- Country: Slovenia
- Traditional region: Upper Carniola
- Statistical region: Central Slovenia
- Municipality: Medvode

Area
  - Total: 1.31 km^{2} (0.51 sq mi)
- Elevation: 319.5 m (1,048 ft)

Population (2002)
  - Total: 514

Verje (pronounced [ʋɛɾˈjɛ]) is a settlement on the left bank of the Sava River at Medvode in the Upper Carniola region of Slovenia.
