= Ladja =

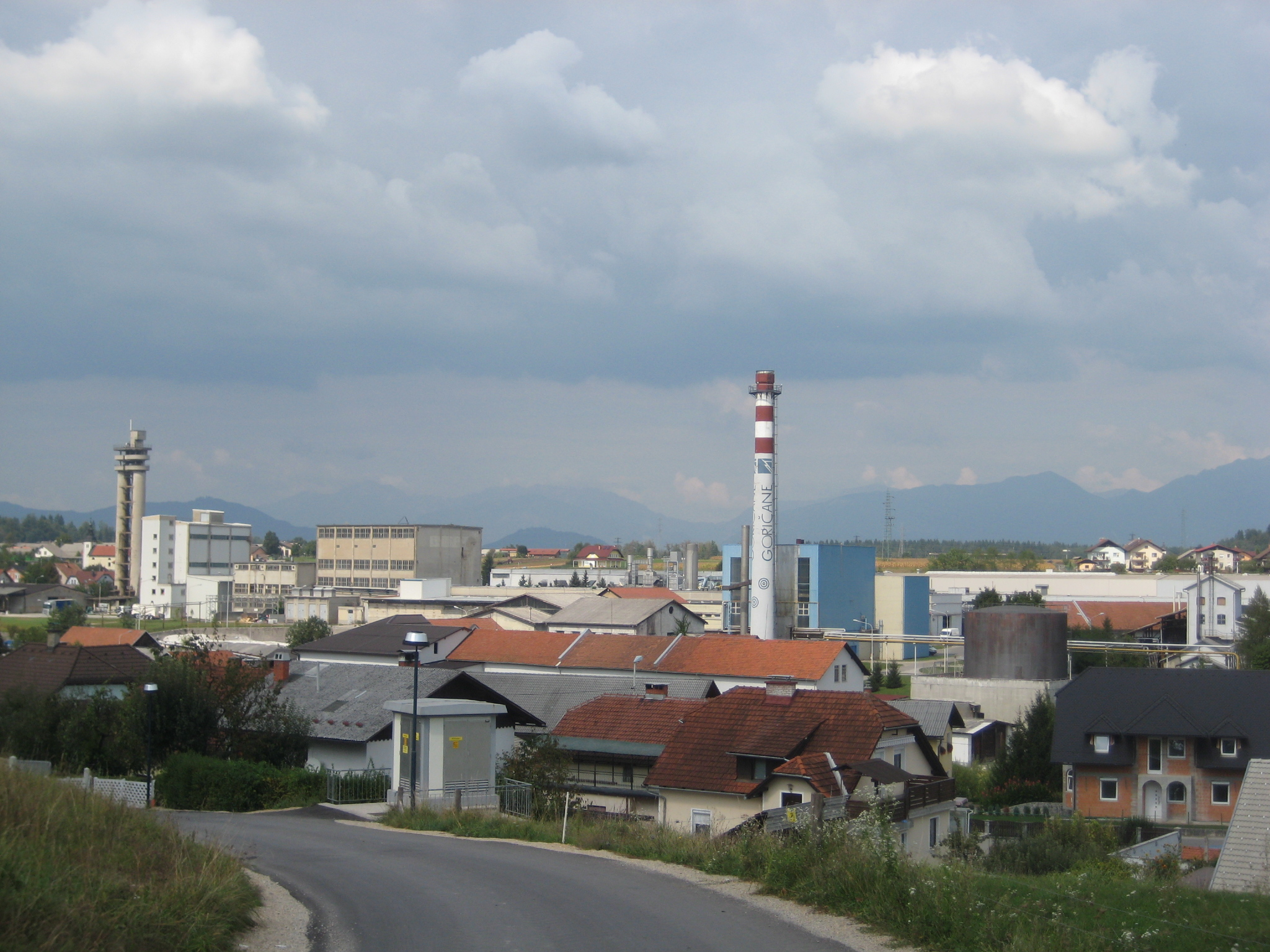

- Location in Slovenia
- Coordinates: 46°8′44.78″N 14°23′33″E
- Country: Slovenia
- Traditional region: Upper Carniola
- Statistical region: Central Slovenia
- Municipality: Medvode

Area
  - Total: 0.42 km^{2} (0.16 sq mi)
- Elevation: 327.6 m (1,075 ft)

Population (2002)
  - Total: 144

Ladja (pronounced [ˈlaːdja]) is a settlement on the left bank of the Sora River in the Municipality of Medvode in the Upper Carniola region of Slovenia.

== Name ==
Ladja was attested in historical sources in 1318 as Schaph (and as zum Scheff in 1439, Schepph in 1444, and Naladia and Naladi in 1763–1787). Both the modern Slovenian name and the Middle High German names mean 'ship', probably referring to a place on the Sora River where a ferry operated. The settlement may be the same as one attested in 973 under the name Stressoubrod (presumably 'Stres's ferry').

== Church ==
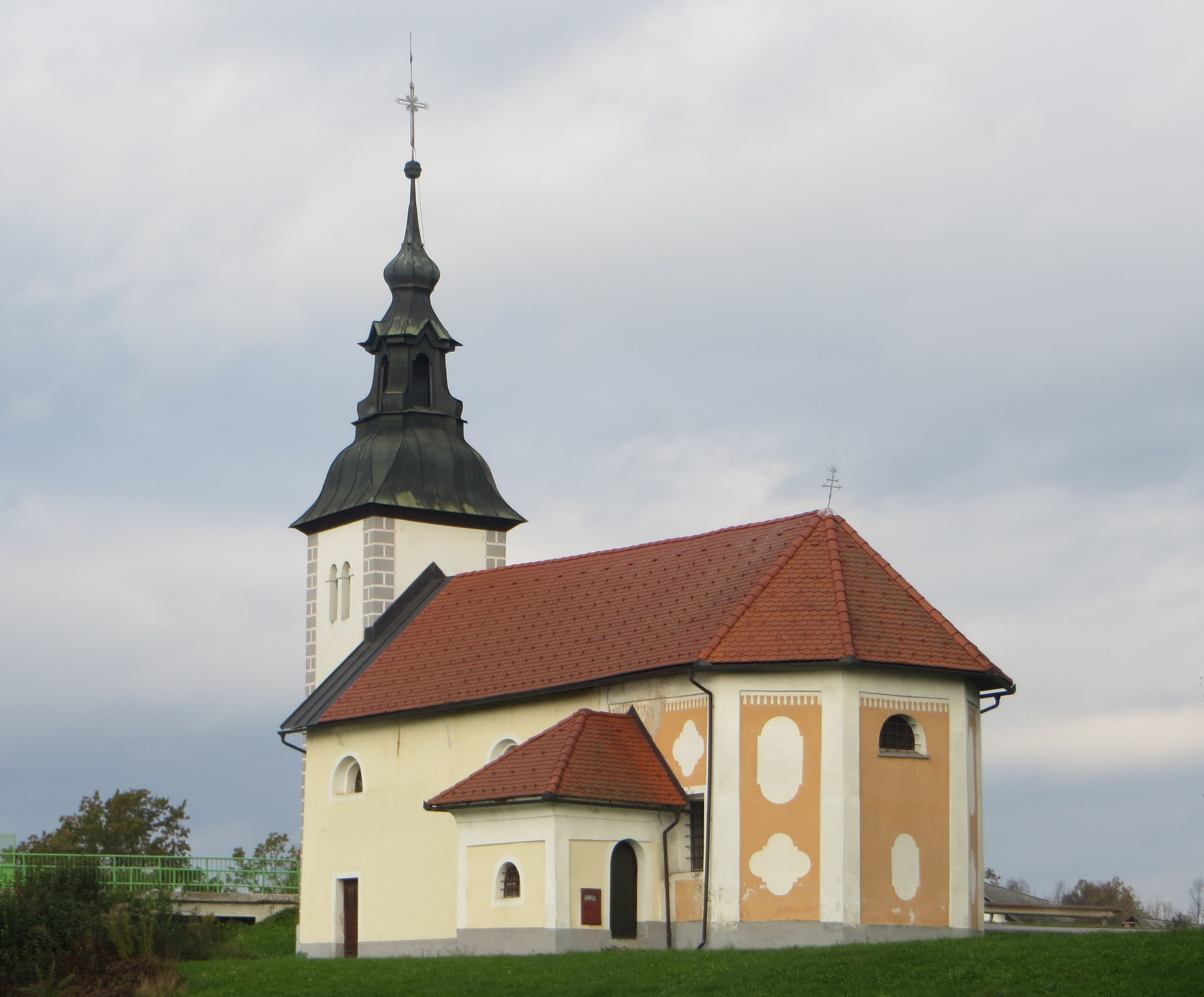
Saint Peter's Church

The local church is dedicated to Saint Peter.
