= Vaše =

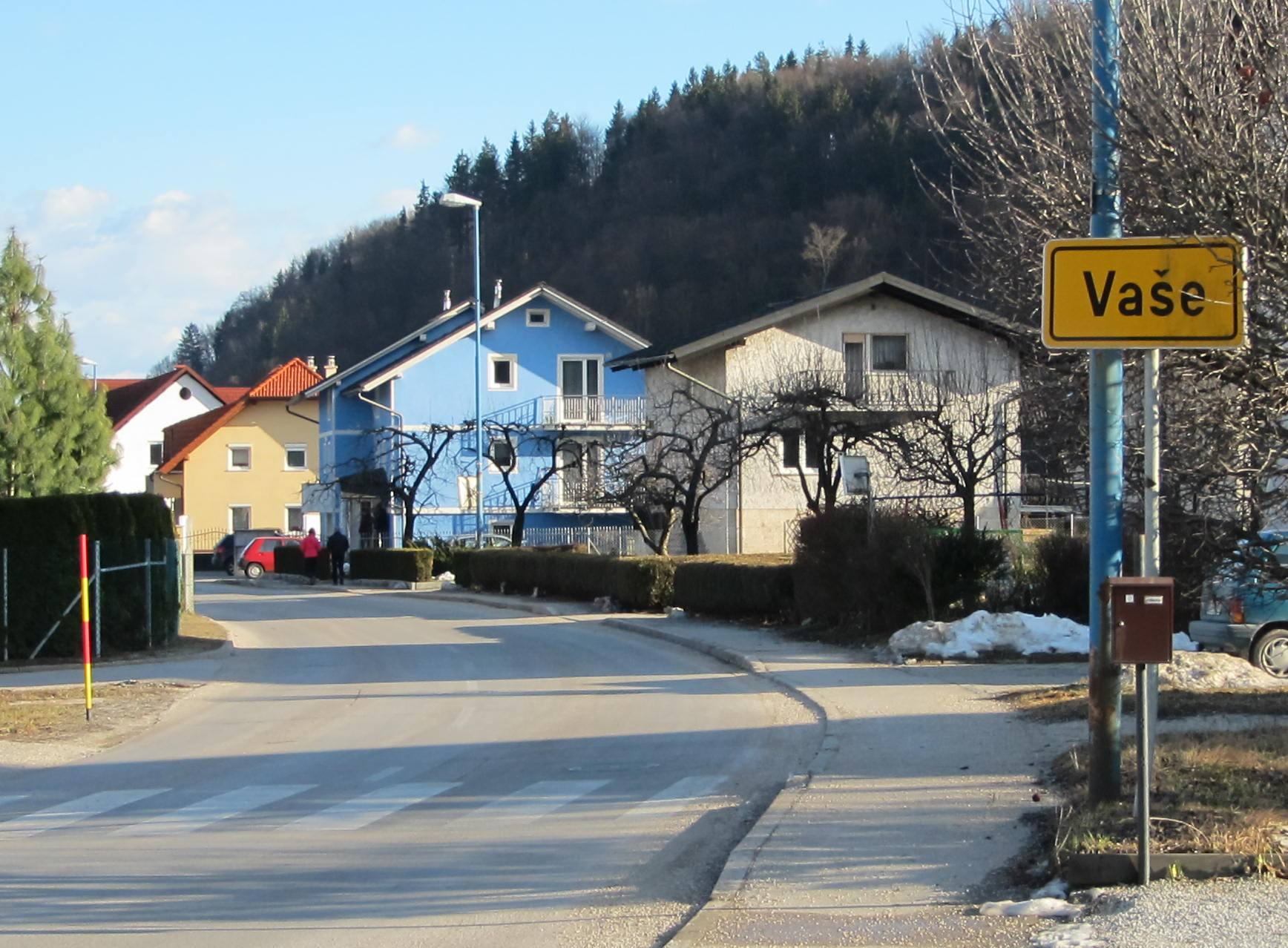
- Vaše

- Location in Slovenia
- Coordinates: 46°8′15.79″N 14°24′2.21″E
- Country: Slovenia
- Traditional region: Upper Carniola
- Statistical region: Central Slovenia
- Municipality: Medvode

Area
  - Total: 1.15 km^{2} (0.44 sq mi)
- Elevation: 323.6 m (1,062 ft)

Population (2013)
  - Total: 544

Vaše (pronounced [ˈʋaːʃɛ]) is a settlement on the right bank of the Sora River just before its confluence with the Sava River at Medvode in the Upper Carniola region of Slovenia.

== Name ==
Vaše was first attested in written sources in 1318 as Weisach (later as Watschach in 1353, Waschach in 1373, Waczach in 1393, Wartschach and Watschach in 1444, and Wartschach in 1453). These are all locative forms. The medieval attestations indicate that -š- developed from -šč- and that the name is therefore likely derived from the demonym *Vaščane (literally, 'villagers').
