= Zbilje =

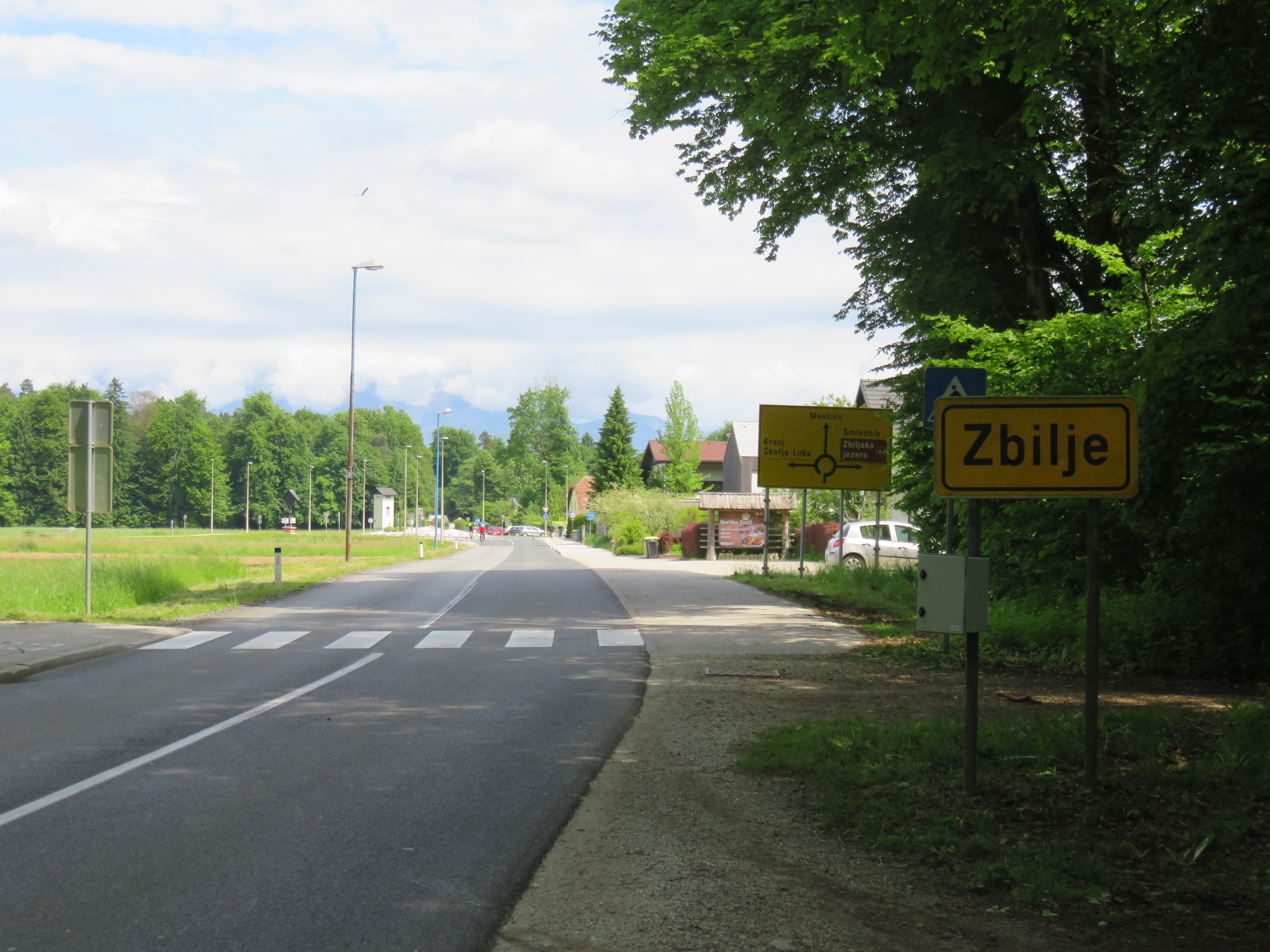

- Location in Slovenia
- Coordinates: 46°9′28.98″N 14°25′3.87″E
- Country: Slovenia
- Traditional region: Upper Carniola
- Statistical region: Central Slovenia
- Municipality: Medvode

Area
  - Total: 2.38 km^{2} (0.92 sq mi)
- Elevation: 335.1 m (1,099 ft)

Population (2002)
  - Total: 630

Zbilje (pronounced [ˈzbiːljɛ];in older sources also Svilje, German: Swile) is a settlement in the Municipality of Medvode in the Upper Carniola region of Slovenia.

== Geography ==
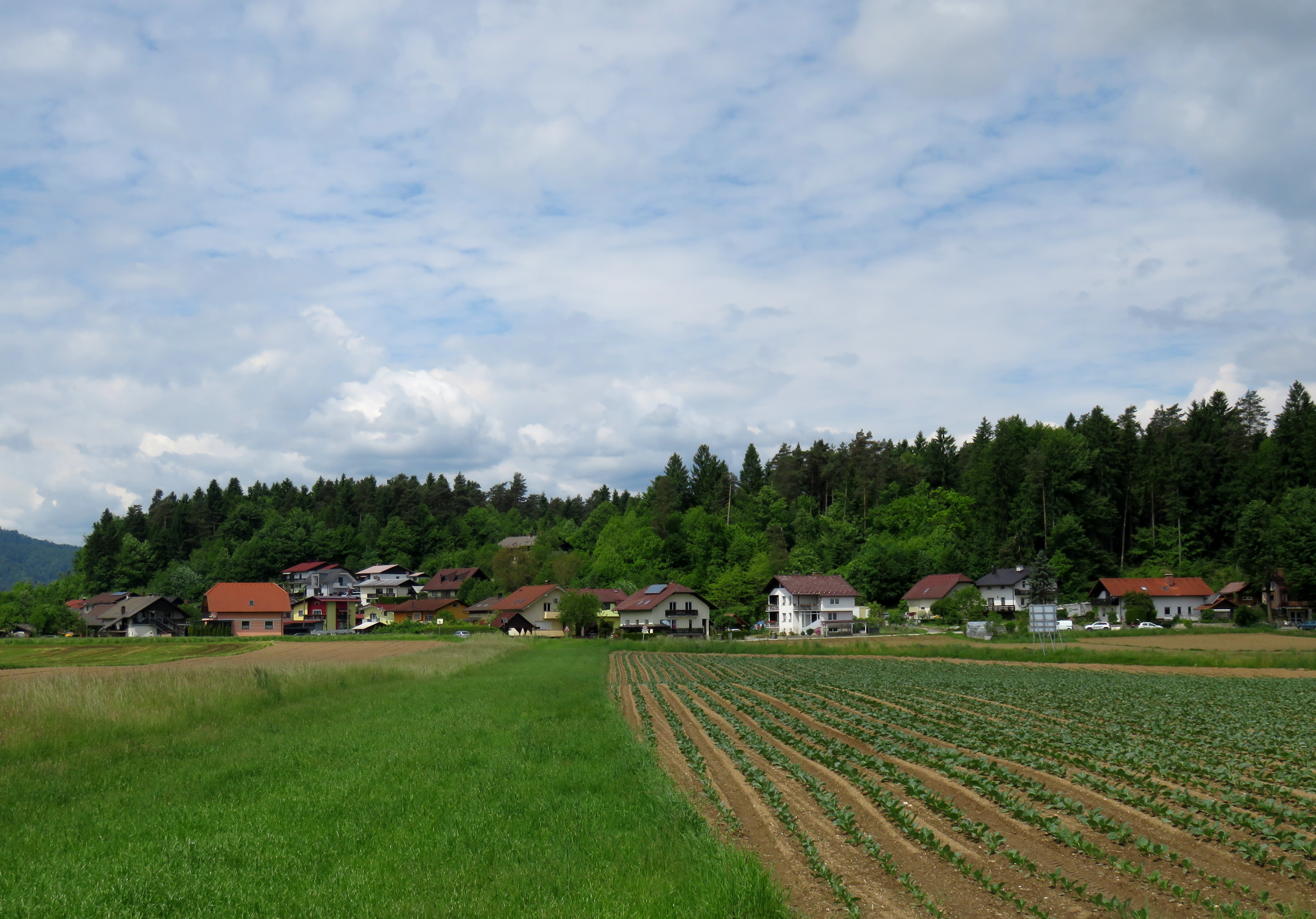
The hamlet of Žeje

The settlement lies next Lake Zbilje (Slovene: Zbiljsko jezero), a reservoir created in 1954 by building the Medvode hydroelectric power plant. The lake is a popular tourist site. Fields lie to the north and west of the settlement. The settlement includes the hamlets of Na Brodu near the bridge across Lake Zbilje, and Žeje (German: Scheje) and Jeprca (German: St. Nikolai) to the west, on the south side of Žeje Hill (Slovene: Žejski hrib).

== Name ==
Zbilje was attested in written sources in 1311 as Villach (and as Sbyliach in 1341, Willagk in 1379, Zwilach in 1410, Zwillach in 1444, and Swillach in 1499). The origin of the name is uncertain. The medieval attestations of the name without initial S- or Z- indicate that it may have been created from the prepositional phrase *z Biljan (with a genitive form of the demonym *Biljane, later yielding -Bilje). A second possibility is that the name is derived from the personal name *Sъbylъ, preserved today in the Slovene surname Sbil. A less likely possibility is that it was created from the personal name *Bylъ with the prefix *sъ. In the past the German name was Swile.

== History ==
The settlement originally stood 1 km north of its present site, on the right side of the road to Podreča. At some point, the old settlement burned down, and the villagers moved to the current location, where they built their houses. When the fields are plowed at the old site, this occasionally turns up pieces of the old road that used to run through the village.

== Church ==
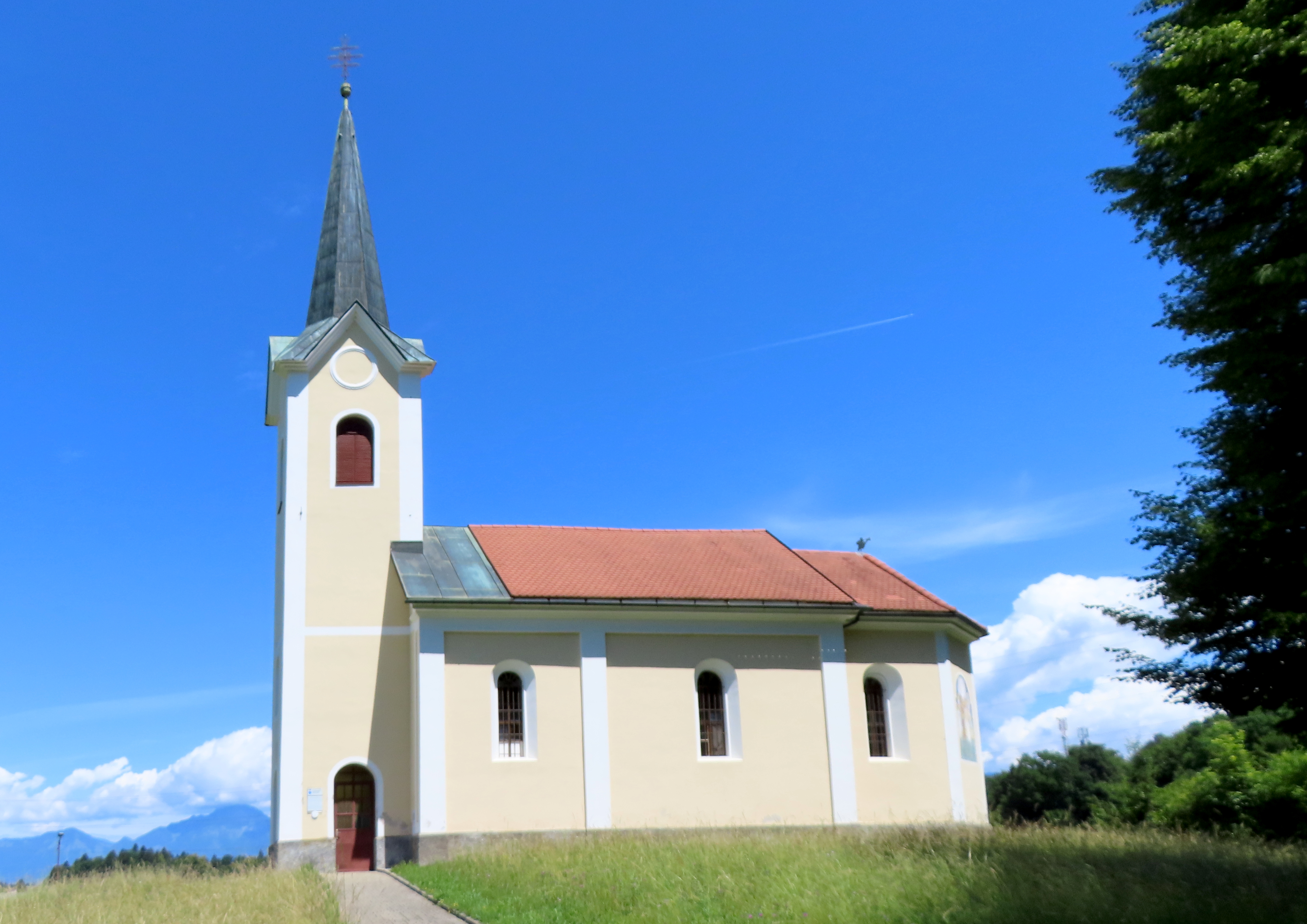
Saint John the Baptist Church

The local church in the settlement is dedicated to John the Baptist, built in 1883 on the site of an earlier church that was consecrated in 1496. The main altar dates to 1665. The painting of Saint Andrew on the right side of the altar is a work by Marko Layer, and the painting of Saint Valentine on the left side of the altar was painted by Matej Trpin in 1915. The church was formerly a pilgrimage church and was known as Saint John the Baptist in Lešovje (Slovene: Janez Krstnik v Lešovju).

== Notable people ==
Notable people that were born or lived in Zbilje include:

- Valentin Janhar (1901–1945), agricultural journalist
- Frančišek Ločniškar (1885–1947), poet and children's writer
