= Zgornja Senica =

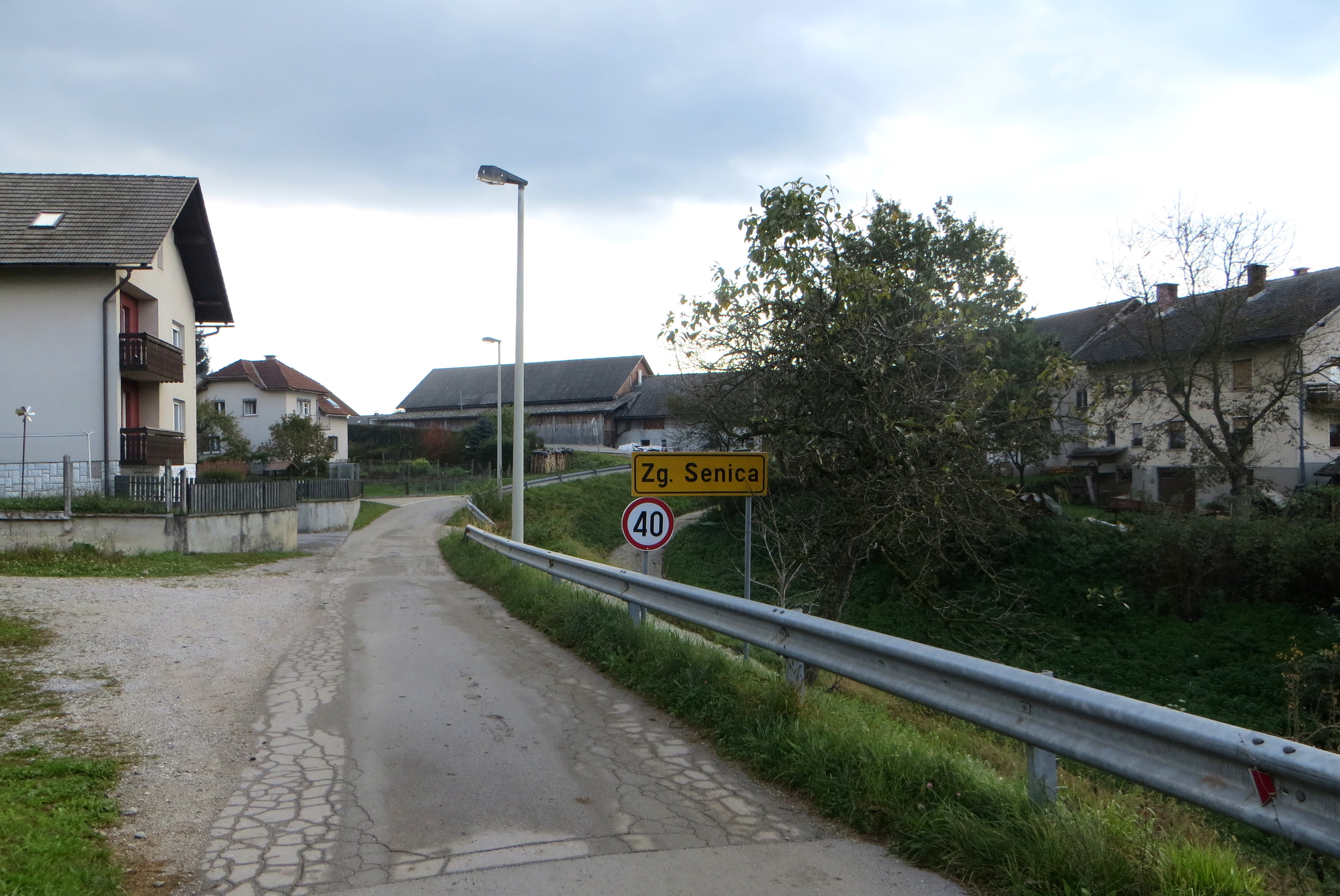

- Location in Slovenia
- Coordinates: 46°9′6.33″N 14°23′3.87″E
- Country: Slovenia
- Traditional region: Upper Carniola
- Statistical region: Central Slovenia
- Municipality: Medvode

Area
  - Total: 0.64 km^{2} (0.25 sq mi)
- Elevation: 339.2 m (1,113 ft)

Population (2002)
  - Total: 272

Zgornja Senica (pronounced [ˈzɡoːɾnja sɛˈniːtsa]; in older sources also Gorenja Senica, German: Oberseniza) is a village north of Goričane in the Municipality of Medvode in the Upper Carniola region of Slovenia.
