= Brezovica pri Medvodah =

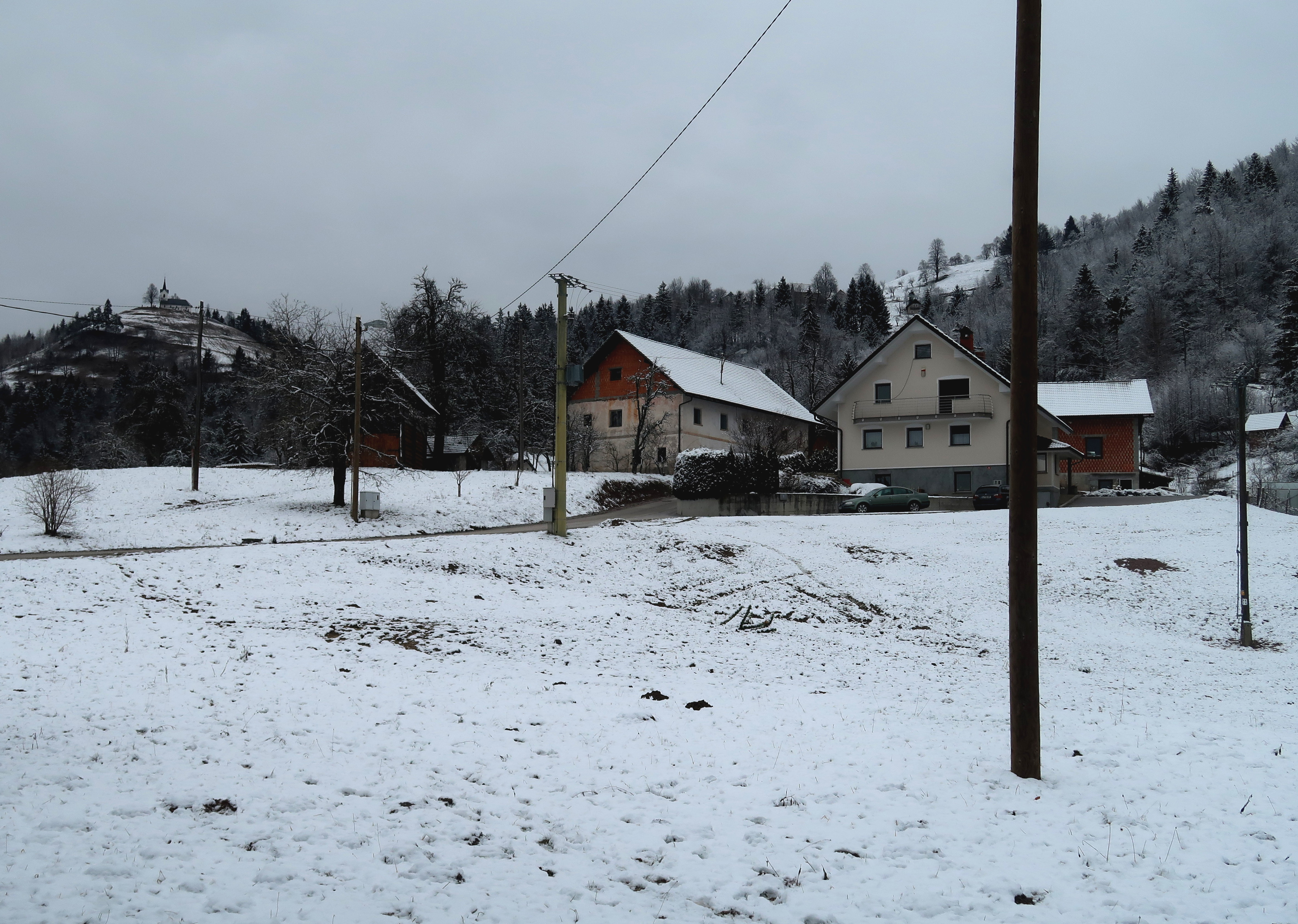

- Location in Slovenia
- Coordinates: 46°5′56.6″N 14°22′3.15″E
- Country: Slovenia
- Traditional region: Upper Carniola
- Statistical region: Central Slovenia
- Municipality: Medvode

Area
  - Total: 2.84 km^{2} (1.10 sq mi)
- Elevation: 646.2 m (2,120 ft)

Population (2002)
  - Total: 10

Brezovica pri Medvodah (pronounced [ˈbɾéːzɔʋitsa pɾi mɛˈdʋóːdax]; German: Bresowitz) is a small settlement in the Municipality of Medvode in the Upper Carniola region of Slovenia.

== Name ==
Brezovica pri Medvodah was attested in historical sources as Pirg in 1444. The name of the settlement was changed from Brezovica to Brezovica pri Medvodah in 1953. In the past the German name was Bresowitz.

== Church ==
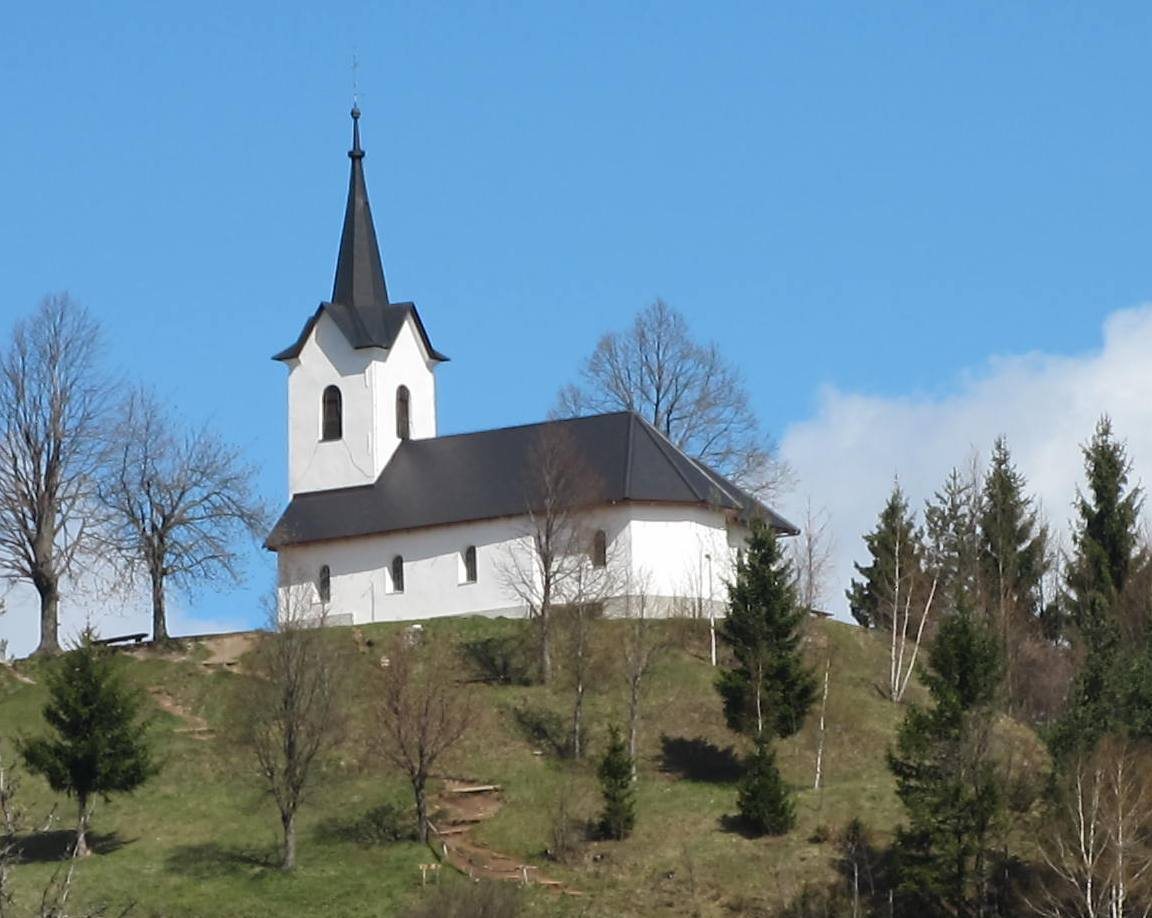
St. James's Church

The local church, built on a hill above the village, is dedicated to Saint James.
