= Studenčice, Medvode =

Studenčice
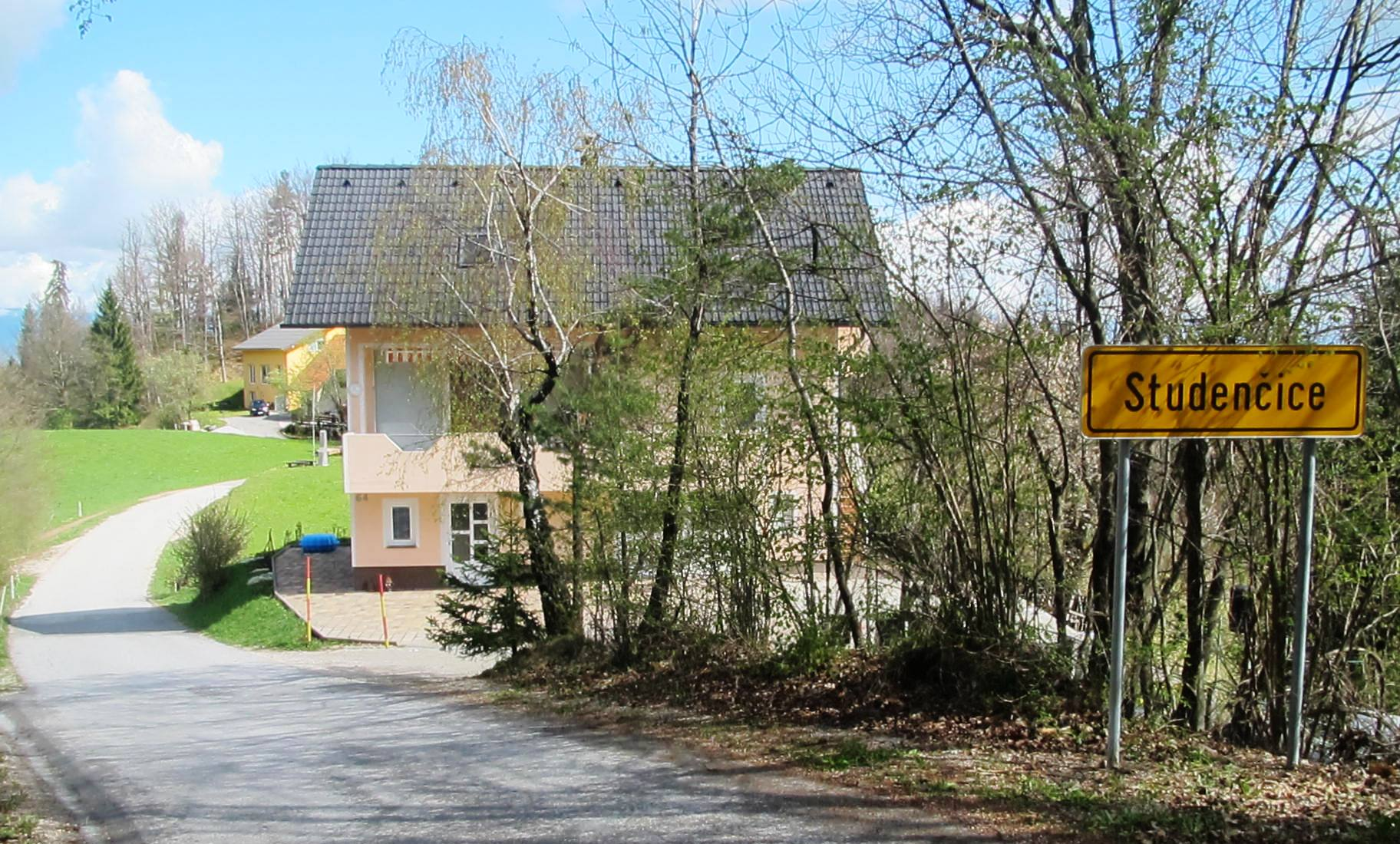

- Location in Slovenia
- Coordinates: 46°7′27.08″N 14°22′39.81″E
- Country: Slovenia
- Traditional region: Upper Carniola
- Statistical region: Central Slovenia
- Municipality: Medvode

Area
  - Total: 2.93 km^{2} (1.13 sq mi)
- Elevation: 553 m (1,814 ft)

Population (2002)
  - Total: 109

Studenčice (pronounced [stuˈdɛːntʃitsɛ]; German: Studentschitsch) is a small settlement in the hills east of Medvode in the Upper Carniola region of Slovenia.

== Cultural heritage ==
- A 2 m granite obelisk standing in a meadow north of Studenčice no. 64, east of the road from Studenčice to Tehovec, commemorates the TV G-25 Partisan courier station. The obelisk was designed by Janez Omerza and installed on 5 October 1980. The TV G-25 courier station is also commemorated by a plaque on the front of the house at Studenčice no. 34.
