= Golo Brdo, Medvode =

Golo Brdo
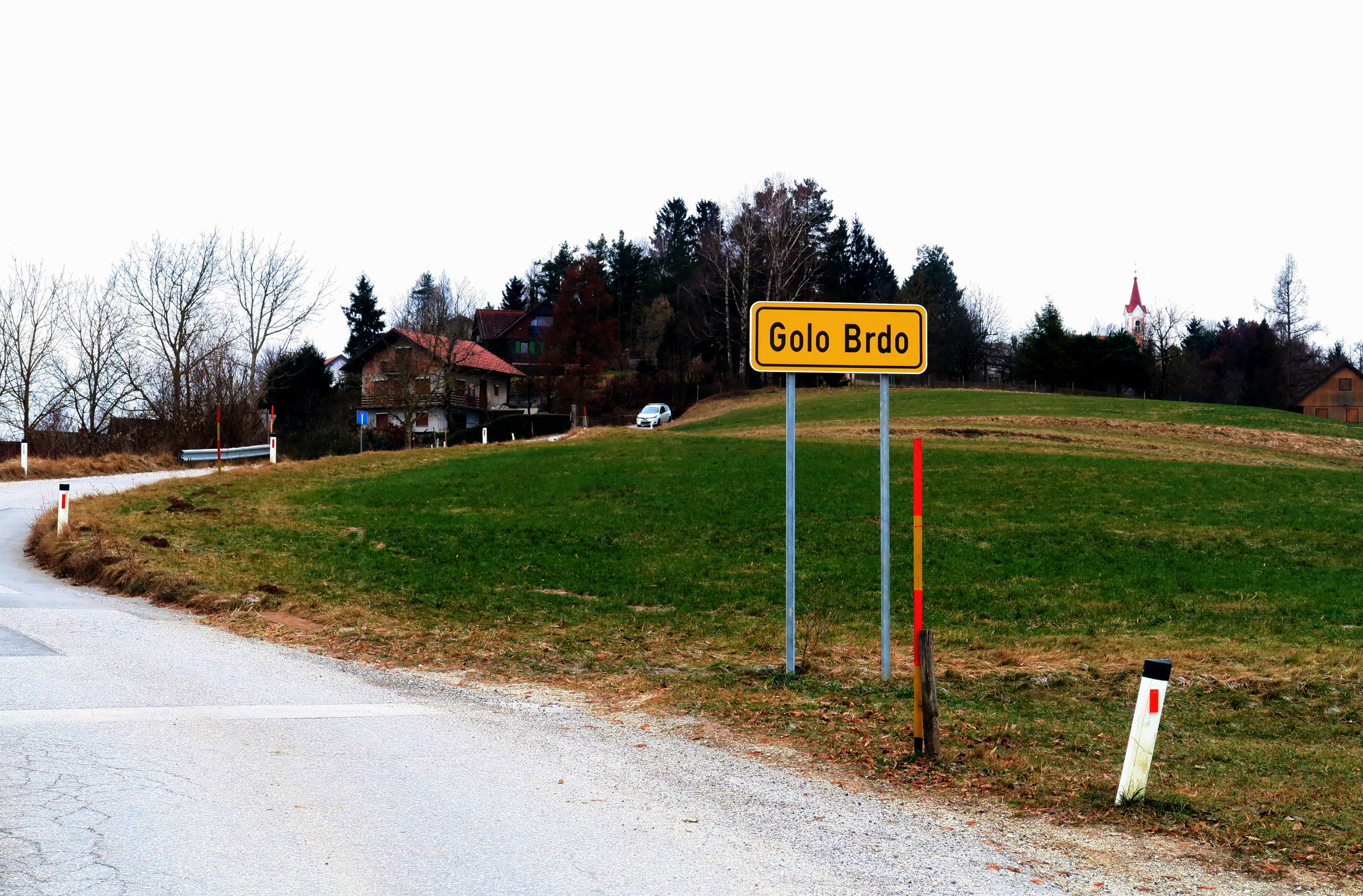
- Golo Brdo in 2020

- Location in Slovenia
- Coordinates: 46°6′34.36″N 14°24′56.39″E
- Country: Slovenia
- Traditional region: Upper Carniola
- Statistical region: Central Slovenia
- Municipality: Medvode

Area
  - Total: 7.56 km^{2} (2.92 sq mi)
- Elevation: 434.9 m (1,427 ft)

Population (2002)
  - Total: 342

Golo Brdo (pronounced [ˈɡɔːlɔ ˈbəɾdɔ]; German: Golowerdu) is a settlement northwest of Ljubljana in Slovenia. It lies within the Municipality of Medvode in the Upper Carniola region.

== Church ==
The church in Golo Brdo is dedicated to the Trinity. It is also known as Holy Spirit Church.
