= Dragočajna =

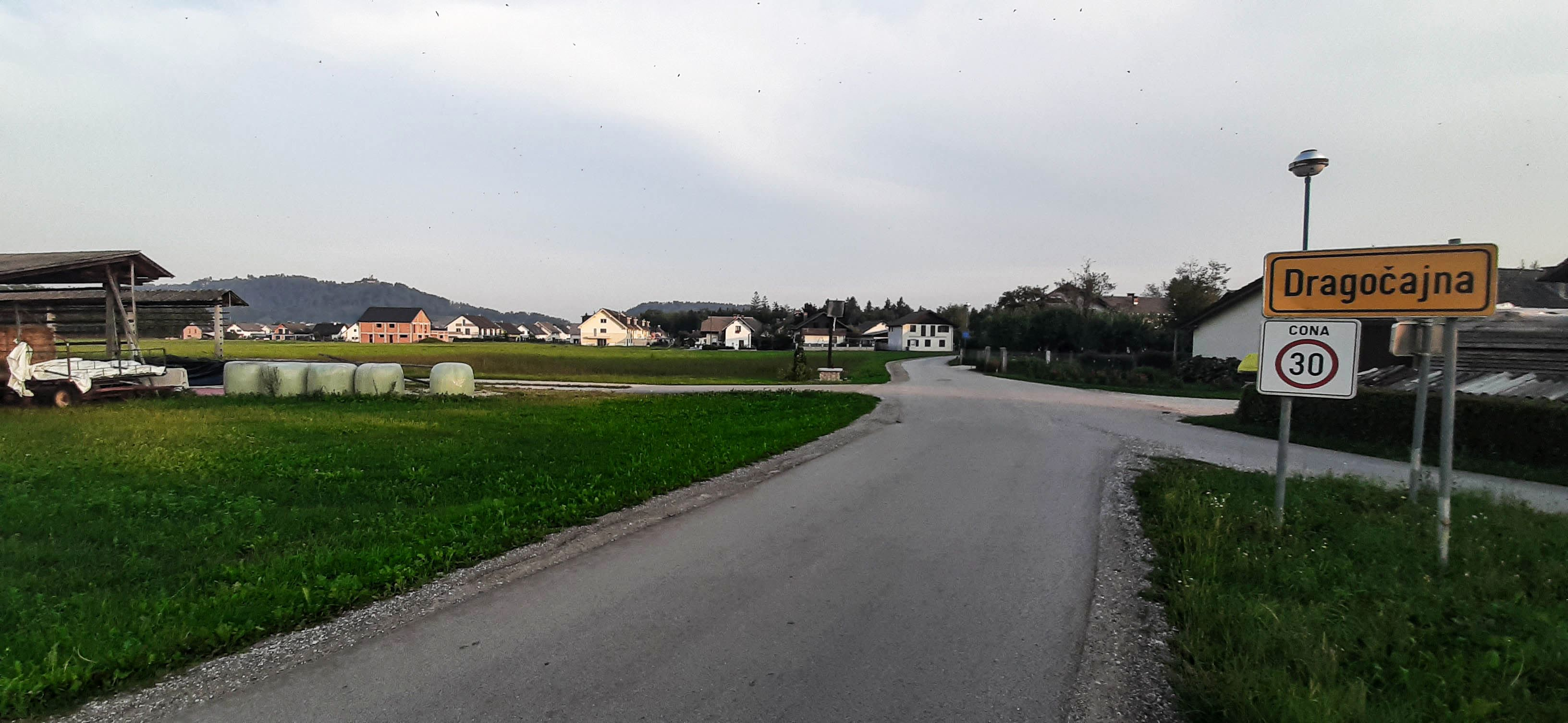
- Dragočajna from northwest (August 2019)

- Location in Slovenia
- Coordinates: 46°10′28.58″N 14°25′3.25″E
- Country: Slovenia
- Traditional region: Upper Carniola
- Statistical region: Central Slovenia
- Municipality: Medvode

Area
  - Total: 2.22 km^{2} (0.86 sq mi)
- Elevation: 349.3 m (1,146 ft)

Population (2002)
  - Total: 171

Dragočajna (pronounced [dɾaɡɔˈtʃaːi̯na]; in older sources also Dragočajn, German: Dragotschein or Dragotschain) is a village on the left bank of the Sava River in the Municipality of Medvode in the Upper Carniola region of Slovenia.

== Name ==
The settlement was first attested in 1455 as Dragotschein. The name is derived from *Dragočajina, based on the Slavic personal name Dragoča(jь), and thus originally meant 'Dragoča's settlement'. The settlement was known as Dragotschein or Dragotschain in German in the past.
