= Preska pri Medvodah =

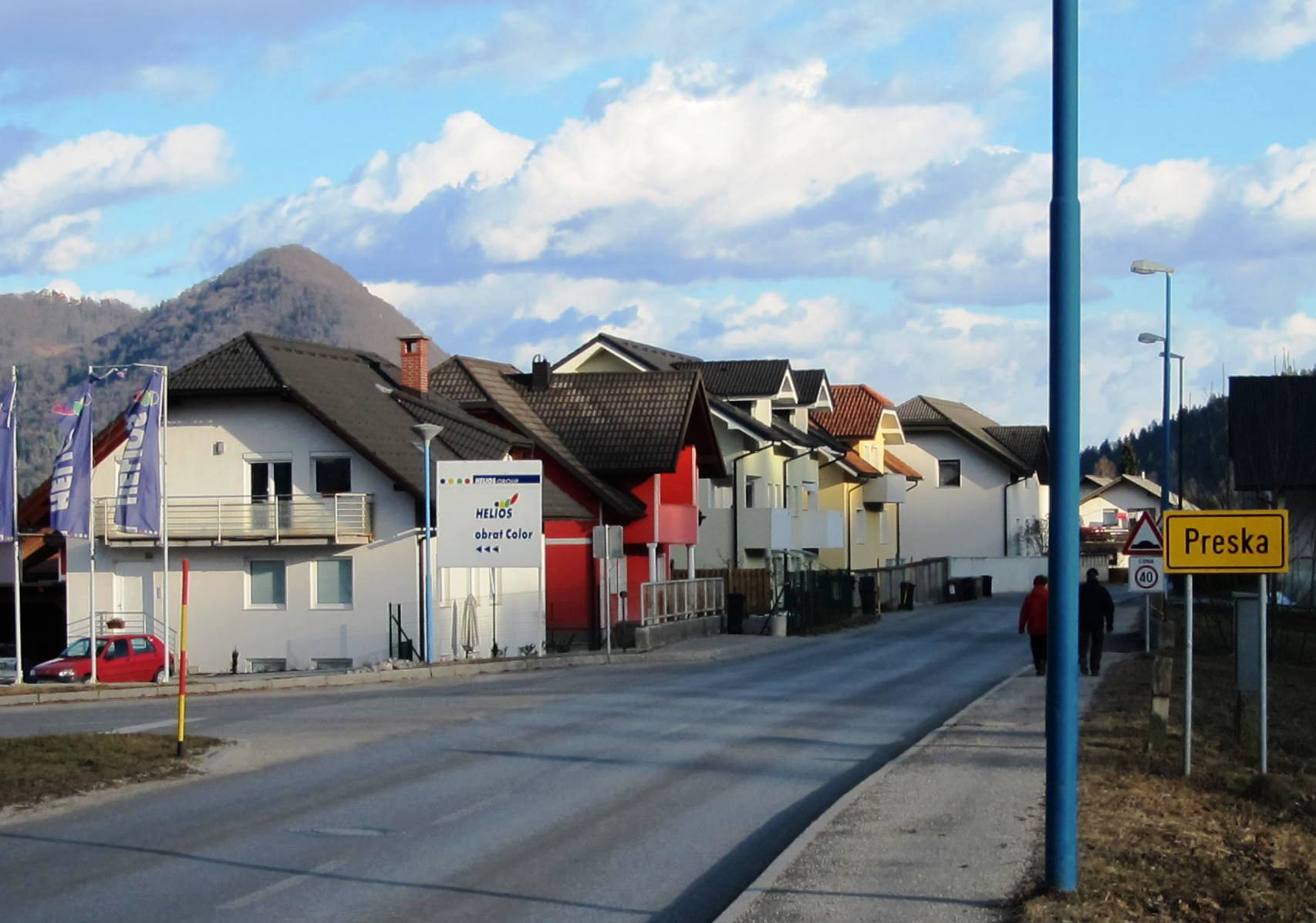

- Location in Slovenia
- Coordinates: 46°8′17″N 14°24′52″E
- Country: Slovenia
- Traditional region: Upper Carniola
- Statistical region: Central Slovenia
- Municipality: Medvode
- Elevation: 313.6 m (1,029 ft)

Preska pri Medvodah (pronounced [ˈpɾeːska pɾi mɛˈdʋoːdax]) is a former settlement that is part of the town of Medvode in the Upper Carniola region of Slovenia.

== Name ==
The name of the settlement was changed from Preska to Preska pri Medvodah in 1955.

== History ==
Preska pri Medvodah was annexed by Medvode in 1980, ending its existence as an independent settlement.

== Church ==
The parish church in the settlement is dedicated to John the Baptist. It was built in 1941 based on plans by the architect Vinko Glanz (1902–1977). The bell tower is older, dating from 1741 and reworked in the mid-19th century. The church's interior was designed by the architect Janez Valentinčič (1904–1994). Paintings in the church include Janez Krstnik (John the Baptist) by Stane Kregar (1905–1973), Krst ob Jordanu (Baptism on the Jordan) by Valentin Metzinger (1699–1759), and Mati Božja (Our Lady) by Matija Bradaška (1852–1915). The church also contains some sculptures from the previous church at the site.
