= Zavrh pod Šmarno Goro =

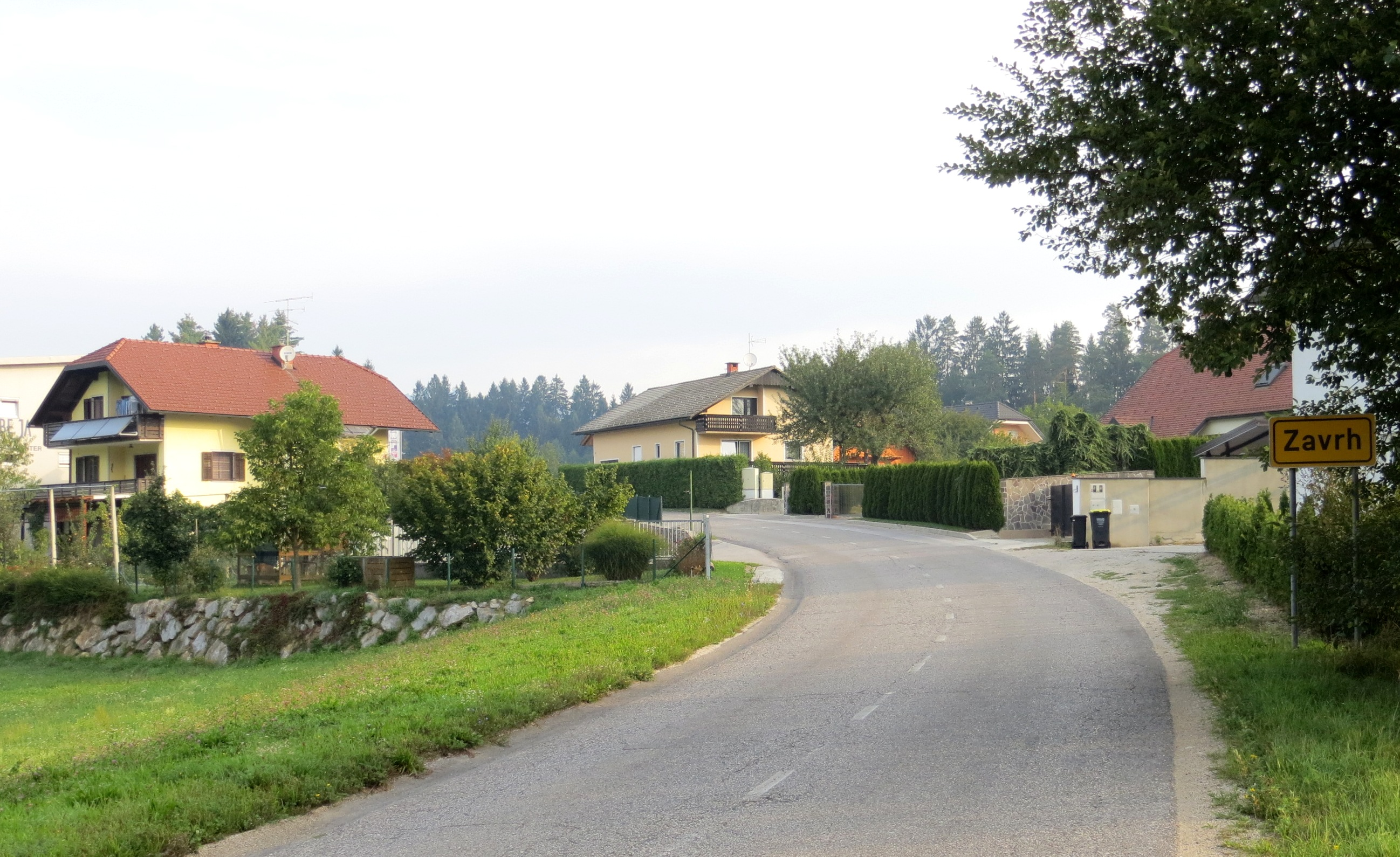

- Location in Slovenia
- Coordinates: 46°8′12.6″N 14°27′28.65″E
- Country: Slovenia
- Traditional region: Upper Carniola
- Statistical region: Central Slovenia
- Municipality: Medvode

Area
  - Total: 2.89 km^{2} (1.12 sq mi)
- Elevation: 358.4 m (1,176 ft)

Population (2002)
  - Total: 209

Zavrh pod Šmarno Goro (pronounced [ˈzaːʋəɾx pɔt ˈʃmaːɾnɔ ˈɡɔːɾɔ]; Slovene: Zavrh pod Šmarno goro) is a settlement in the Municipality of Medvode in the Upper Carniola region of Slovenia.

== Name ==
Zavrh pod Šmarno Goro was attested in written sources as Newdorf in 1372, Kollenperg in 1420, Padwercham in 1436, and Nasa orchim in 1456. The name of the settlement was changed from Zavrh to Zavrh pod Šmarno goro in 1955.

== Notable people ==
Notable people that were born or lived in Zavrh pod Šmarno Goro include:

- Jakob Aljaž (1845–1927), Roman Catholic priest, composer, and mountaineer
