= Dol, Medvode =

Dol
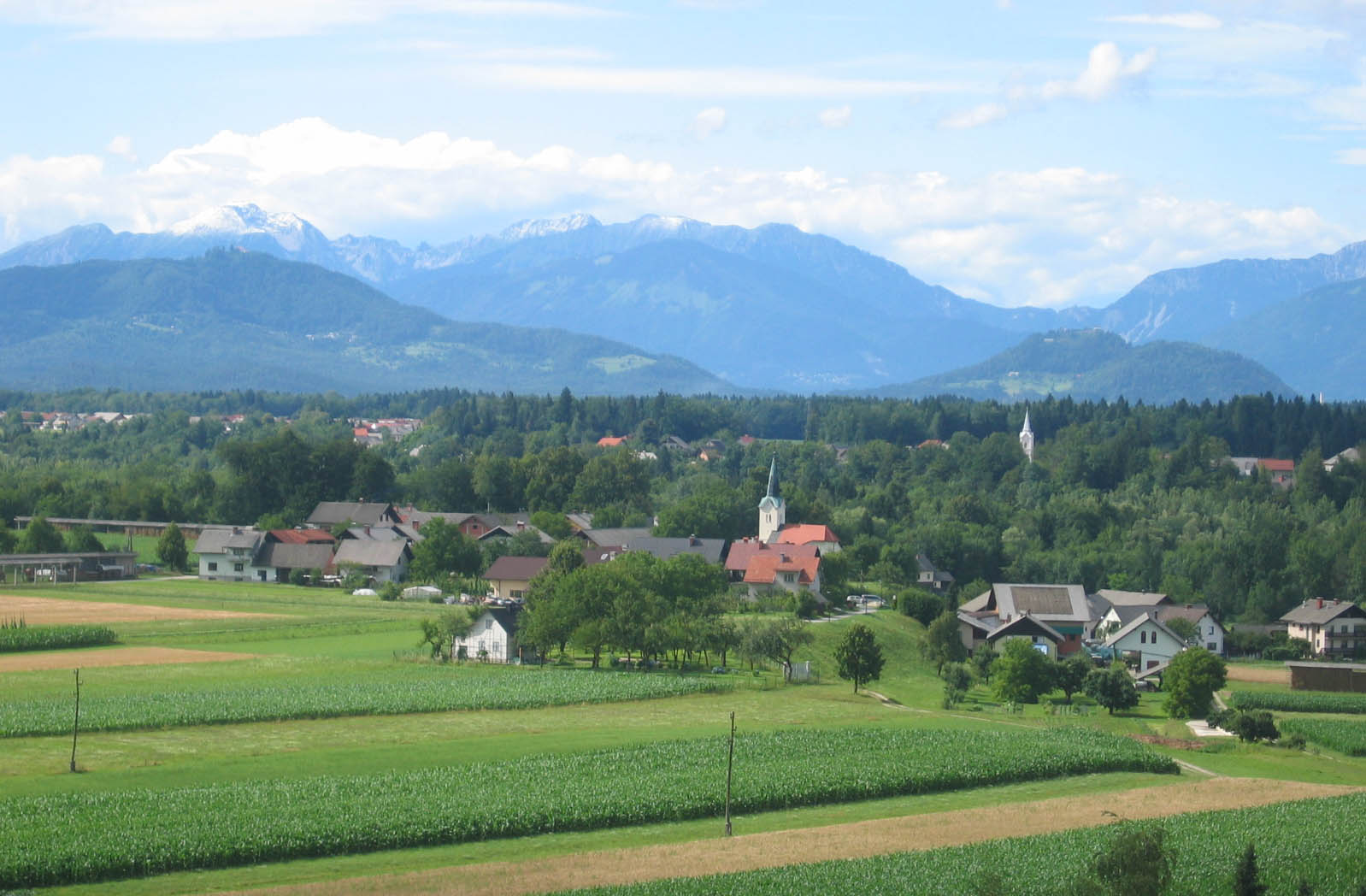

- Location in Slovenia
- Coordinates: 46°8′54.67″N 14°22′4.34″E
- Country: Slovenia
- Traditional region: Upper Carniola
- Statistical region: Central Slovenia
- Municipality: Medvode

Area
  - Total: 0.54 km^{2} (0.21 sq mi)
- Elevation: 334.3 m (1,097 ft)

Population (2002)
  - Total: 88

Dol (pronounced [ˈdoːu̯]) is a small village in the Municipality of Medvode in the Upper Carniola region of Slovenia.

== Church ==
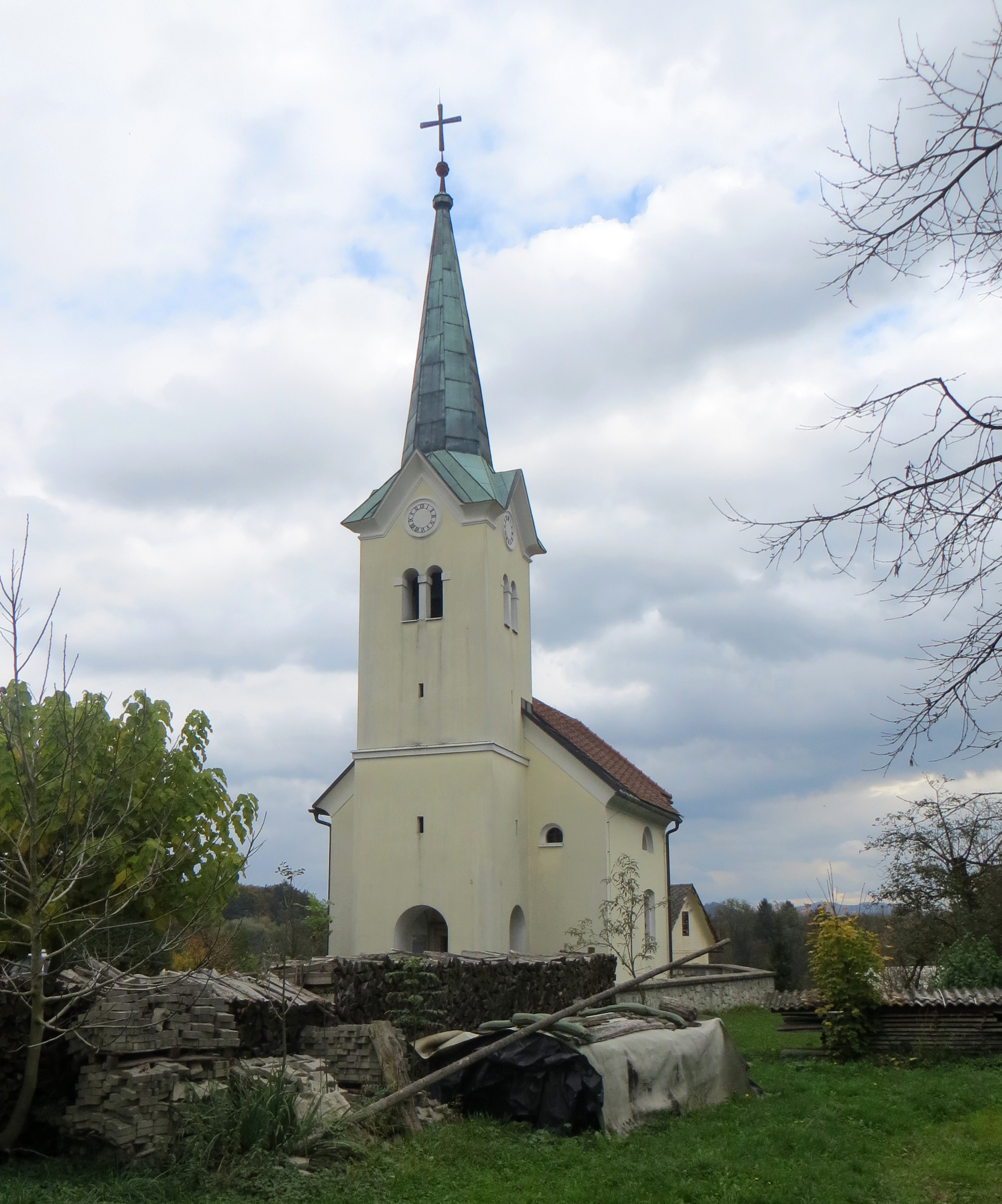
Archangel Michael Church

The local church is dedicated to Archangel Michael.
