= Setnica, Medvode =

Setnica
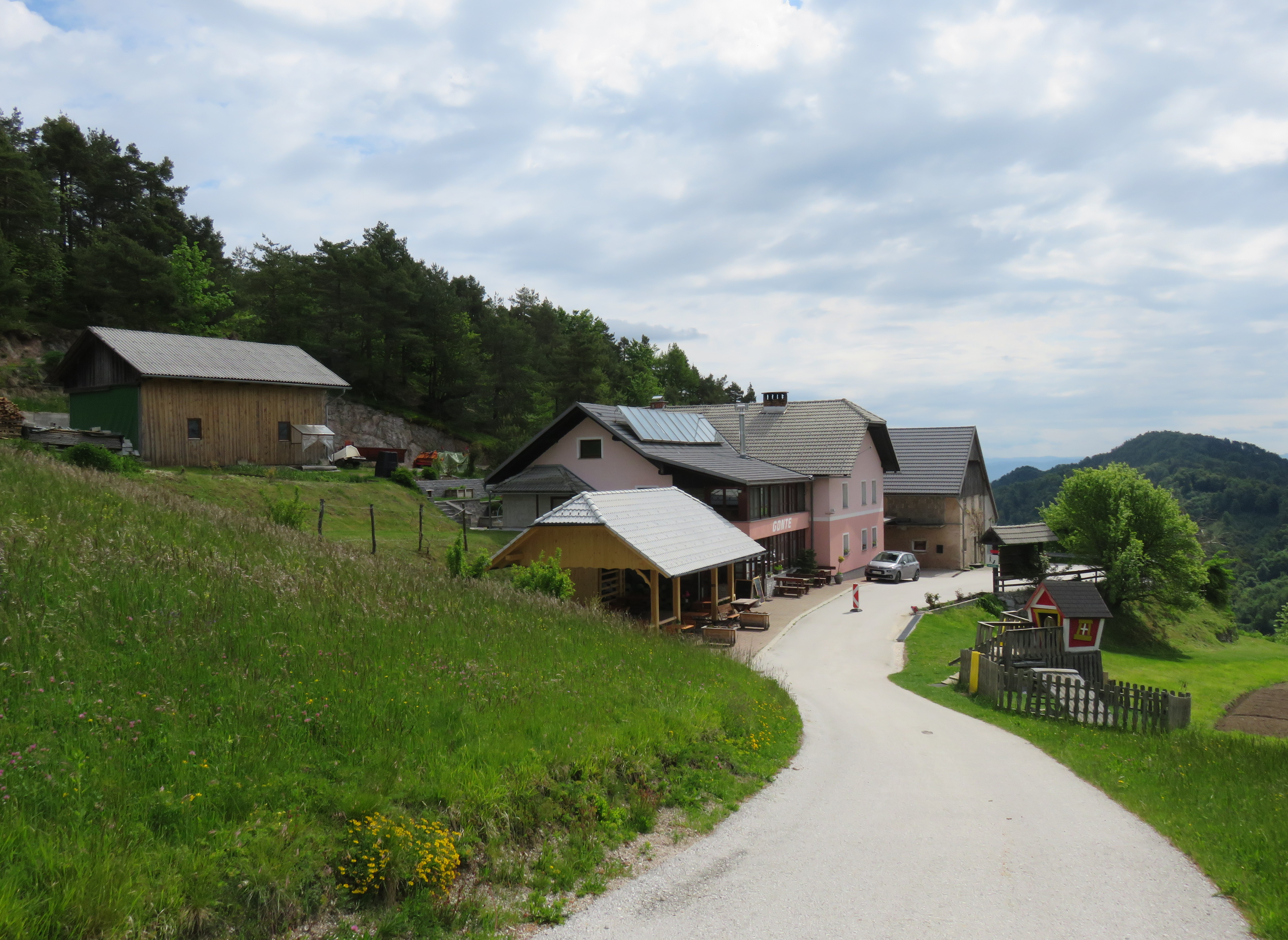

- Location in Slovenia
- Coordinates: 46°5′24.46″N 14°20′11.75″E
- Country: Slovenia
- Traditional region: Upper Carniola
- Statistical region: Central Slovenia
- Municipality: Medvode

Area
  - Total: 1 km^{2} (0.39 sq mi)
- Elevation: 709.9 m (2,329 ft)

Population (2002)
  - Total: 17

Setnica (pronounced [sɛˈtniːtsa]) is a dispersed settlement that is divided between the municipalities of Medvode and Dobrova–Polhov Gradec in the Upper Carniola region of Slovenia. The smaller part is on the Medvode side.
