= Spodnja Senica =

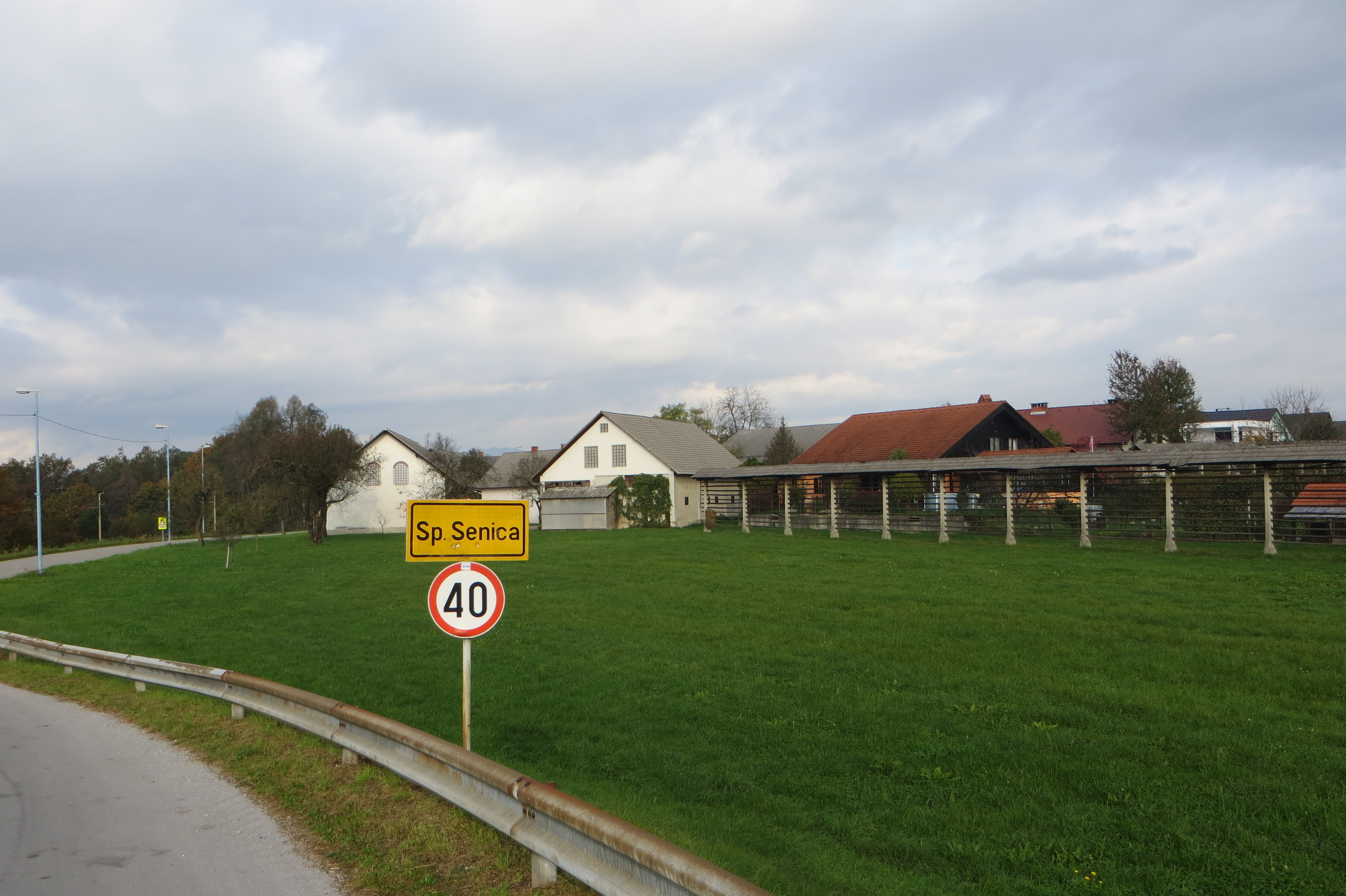

- Location in Slovenia
- Coordinates: 46°9′3.52″N 14°23′23.01″E
- Country: Slovenia
- Traditional region: Upper Carniola
- Statistical region: Central Slovenia
- Municipality: Medvode

Area
  - Total: 0.86 km^{2} (0.33 sq mi)
- Elevation: 342.1 m (1,122 ft)

Population (2002)
  - Total: 337

Spodnja Senica (pronounced [ˈspoːdnja sɛˈniːtsa]; in older sources also Dolenja Senica, German: Unterseniza) is a village on the left bank of the Sora River in the Municipality of Medvode in the Upper Carniola region of Slovenia.
