= Goričane =

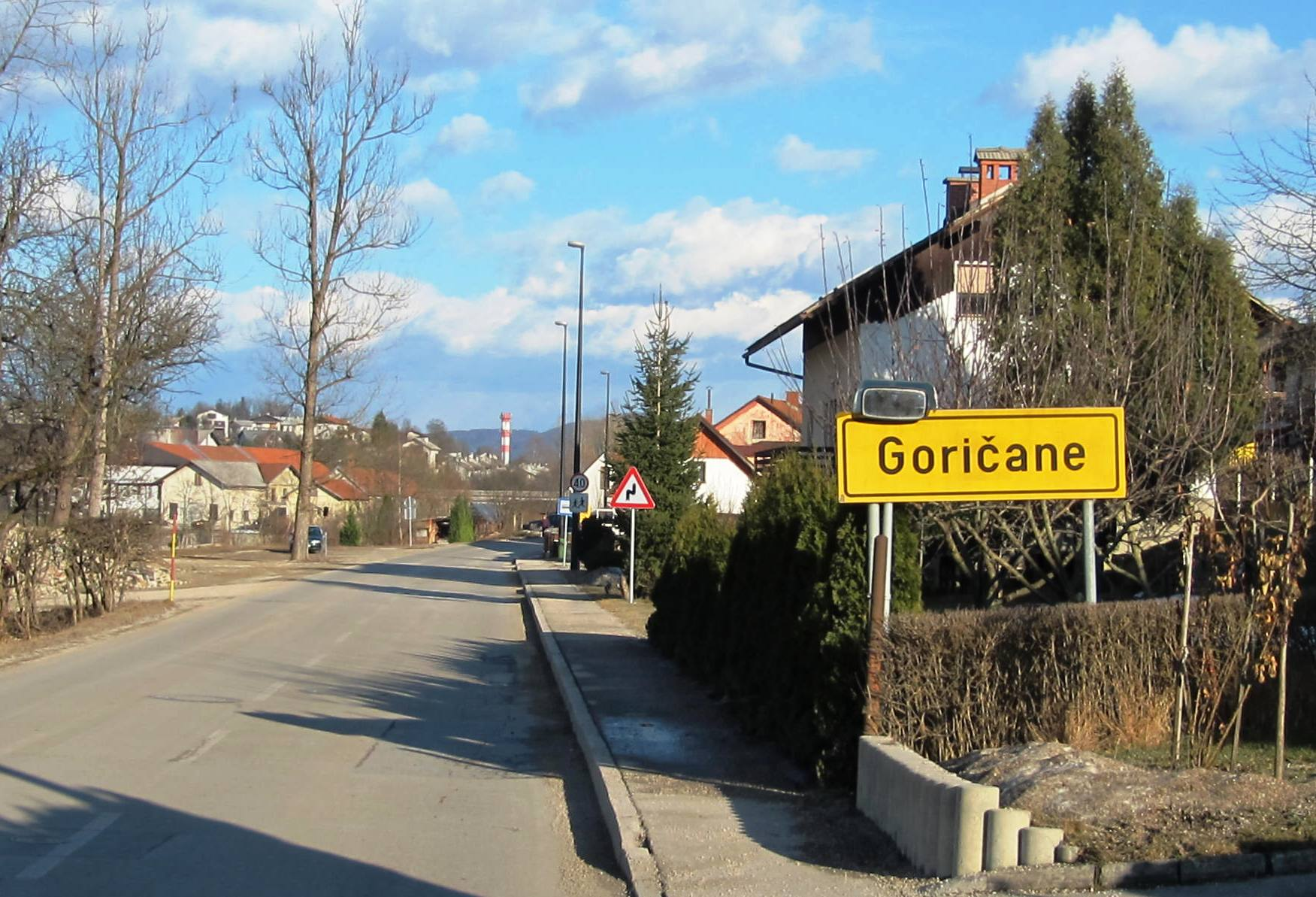
- Goričane

- Location in Slovenia
- Coordinates: 46°8′30.66″N 14°23′56.45″E
- Country: Slovenia
- Traditional region: Upper Carniola
- Statistical region: Central Slovenia
- Municipality: Medvode

Area
  - Total: 0.77 km^{2} (0.30 sq mi)
- Elevation: 319.3 m (1,048 ft)

Population (2002)
  - Total: 529

Goričane (pronounced [ɡɔɾiˈtʃaːnɛ]; German: Görtschach) is a settlement northwest of Ljubljana in Slovenia. It lies on the right bank of the Sora River, just before its confluence with the Sava River, in the Municipality of Medvode in the Upper Carniola region.

== Goričane Manor ==
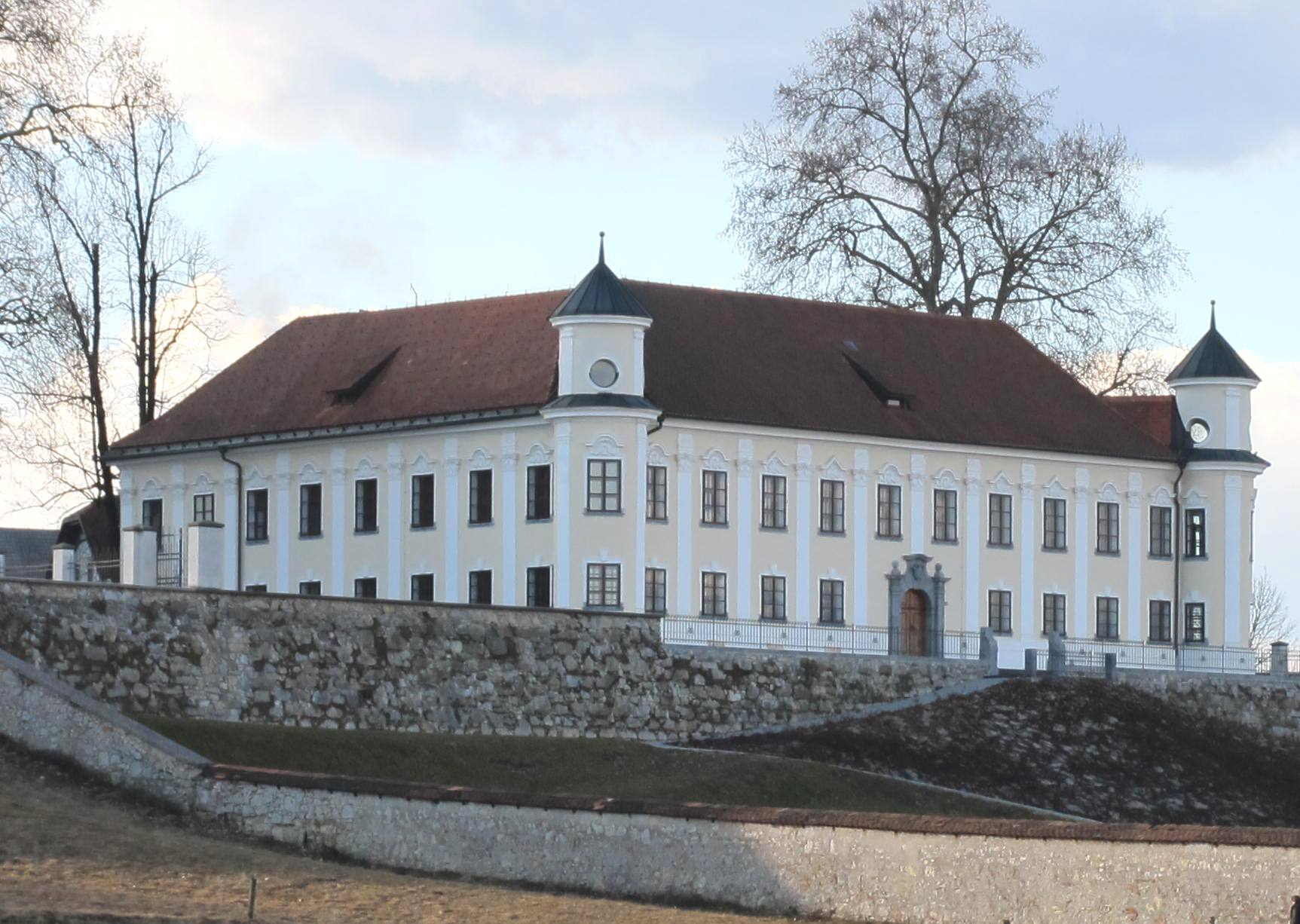
Goričane Manor

Goričane Manor (Slovene: Dvorec Goričane, German: Görtschach), is a large 17th-century manor house in the settlement. It was built using materials from Goričane Castle, which stood just above the site and of which only a few foundation stones are visible. Goričane Castle was owned by the Ljubljana Diocese and, when it fell into ruin, Bishop Oton Buckheim (1606–1664) made the decision to build the manor. Construction took place from 1641 to 1644

In 1934 the manor was the site of a regional conference of the Communist Party of Slovenia, which Josip Broz Tito took part in under the pseudonym Rudi. The manor remained the property of the Ljubljana Diocese until the end of the Second World War, when it was nationalized. It was initially used as residential apartments, but renovation began in 1962 to use the structure for museum purposes. In 1964 the Museum of Non-European Cultures (a branch of the Slovene Ethnographic Museum) was set up in the building.

After Slovenia's independence in 1991, the Ljubljana Archdiocese launched a denationalization suit to have the property returned to it. This was initially denied in 1995. The mansion was used as a museum and exhibition venue until 2001, but it and its surrounding estate were returned by the government to the Archdiocese of Ljubljana. The manor is currently managed by the Parish of Preska. The manor has been undergoing restoration since 2004 and is currently closed to the public.

== Gallery ==
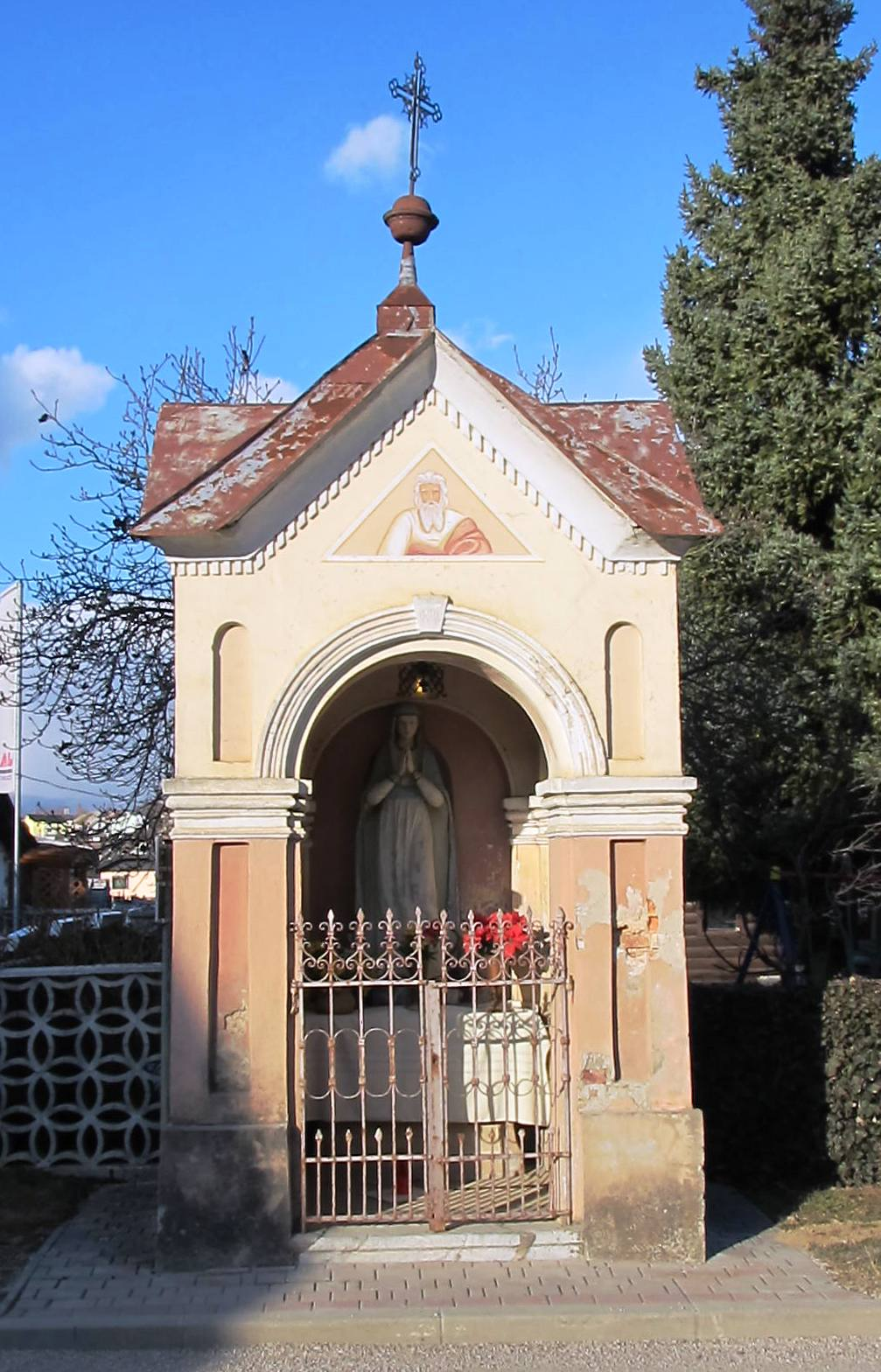
Wayside shrine in Goričane
