= Tehovec, Medvode =

Tehovec
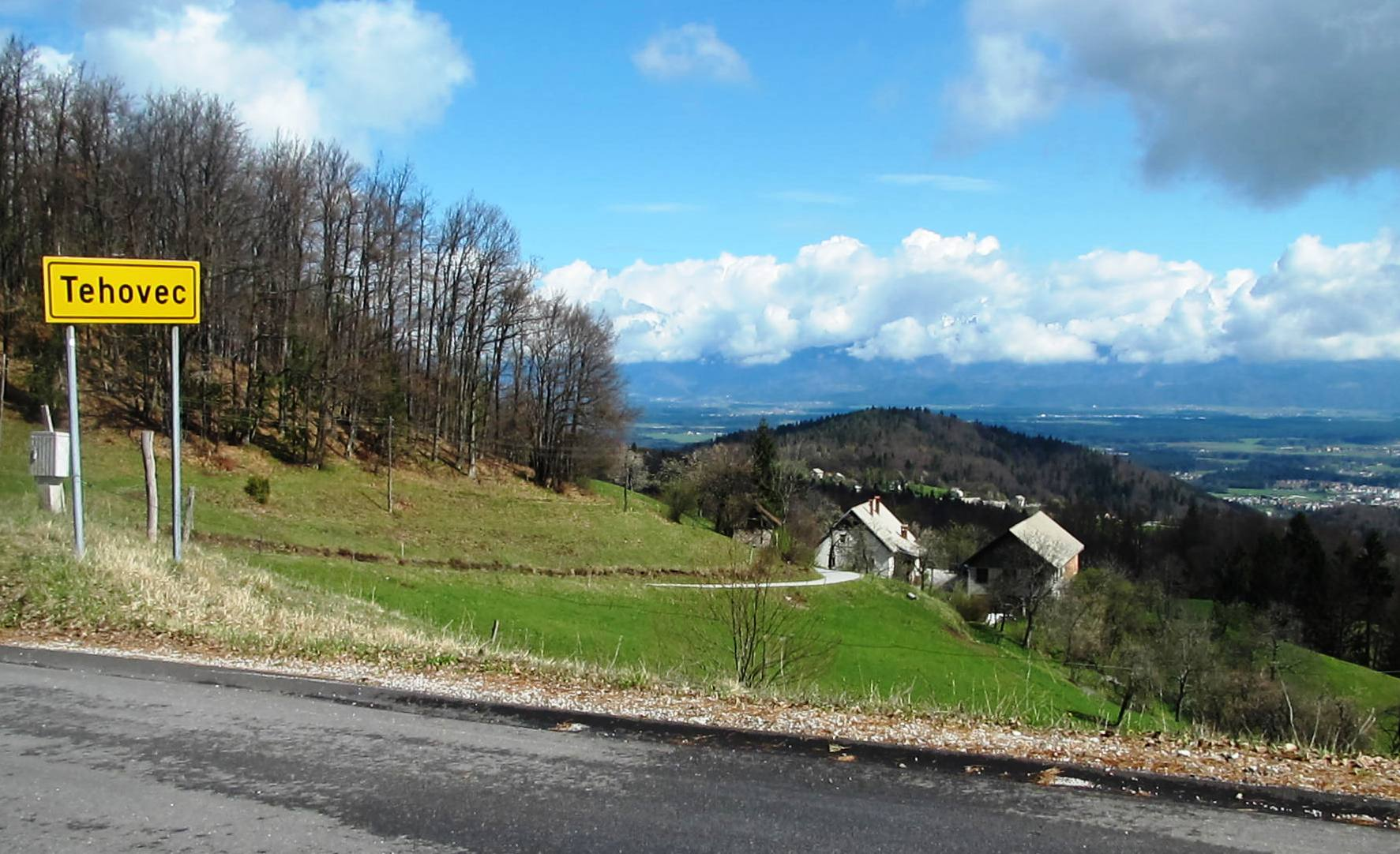

- Location in Slovenia
- Coordinates: 46°6′53.48″N 14°21′55.94″E
- Country: Slovenia
- Traditional region: Upper Carniola
- Statistical region: Central Slovenia
- Municipality: Medvode

Area
  - Total: 2.56 km^{2} (0.99 sq mi)
- Elevation: 673.4 m (2,209 ft)

Population (2002)
  - Total: 23

Tehovec (pronounced [tɛˈxɔːʋəts]) is a small settlement in the hills southwest of Medvode in the Upper Carniola region of Slovenia.

== Name ==
Tehovec was recorded in written sources in 1763–87 as Tehouz. The name may be derived from the Slavic hypocorism *Těxъ, thus referring to an early inhabitant of the place. Pronunciation of the name varies among [tɛˈxɔːʋəts], [-ˈxoː-] and [təˈ-].

== Church ==
The local church is dedicated to Saint Florian. The church was first mentioned in written sources in 1548; additional construction took place in the 16th century and first half of the 17th century. The main altar, dedicated to Saint Florian, dates to 1751. The church also contains side altars dedicated to Saint Primus and Saint Wolfgang.

== Other cultural heritage ==
In addition to Saint Florian's Church, two other structures in Tehovec have designated cultural heritage status:

- A stone monument to members of the hunting society was erected below the church on 16 June 1935.
- The stone granary at the farm at Tehovec no. 1 is built above a cellar and the year 1842 is written on the facade. The upper floor is reached by a single flight of steps, and the entry arch is supported by two columns.
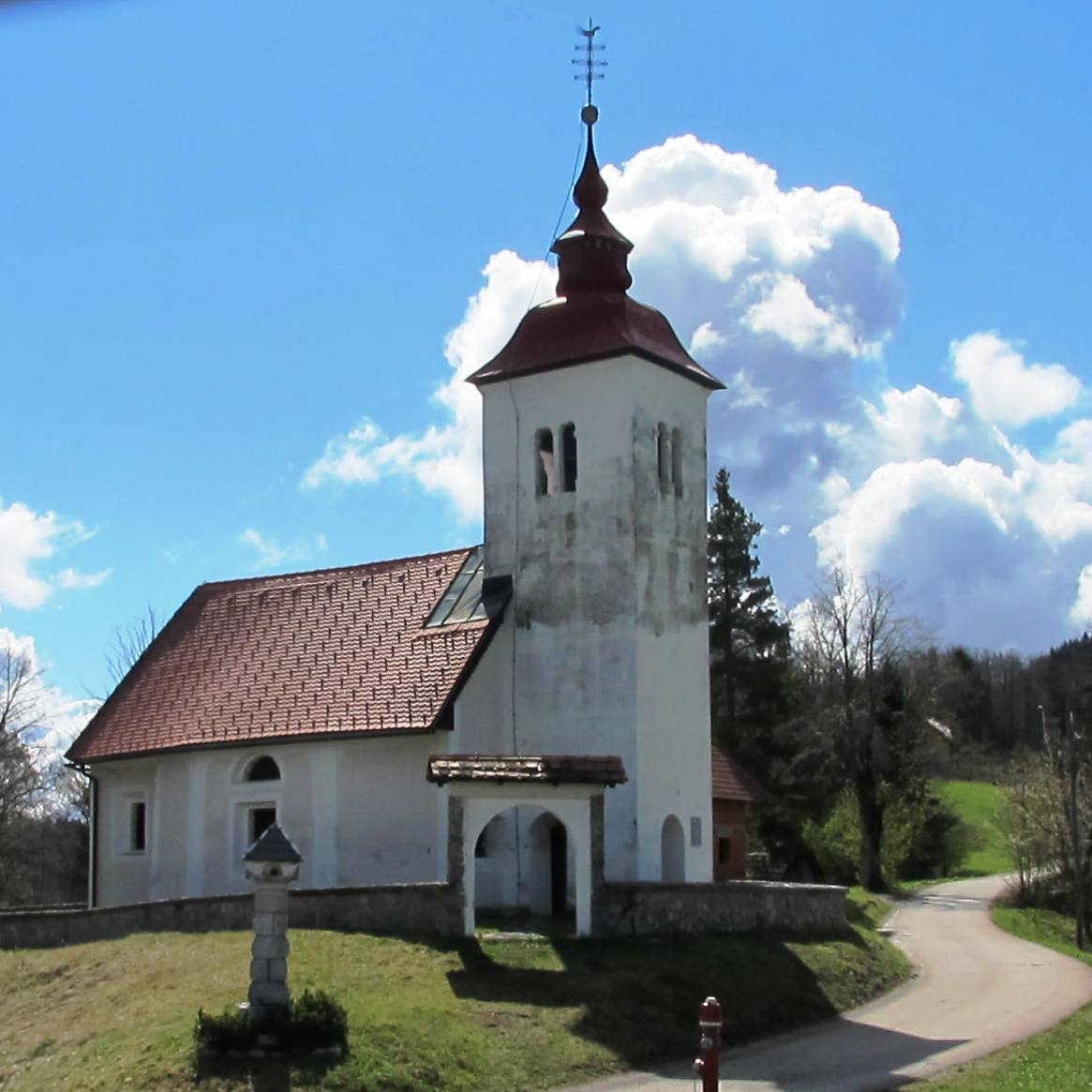
St. Florian's Church in Tehovec
