= Municipality of Medvode =

Municipality of Slovenia

Municipality of Medvode Občina Medvode
- Municipality
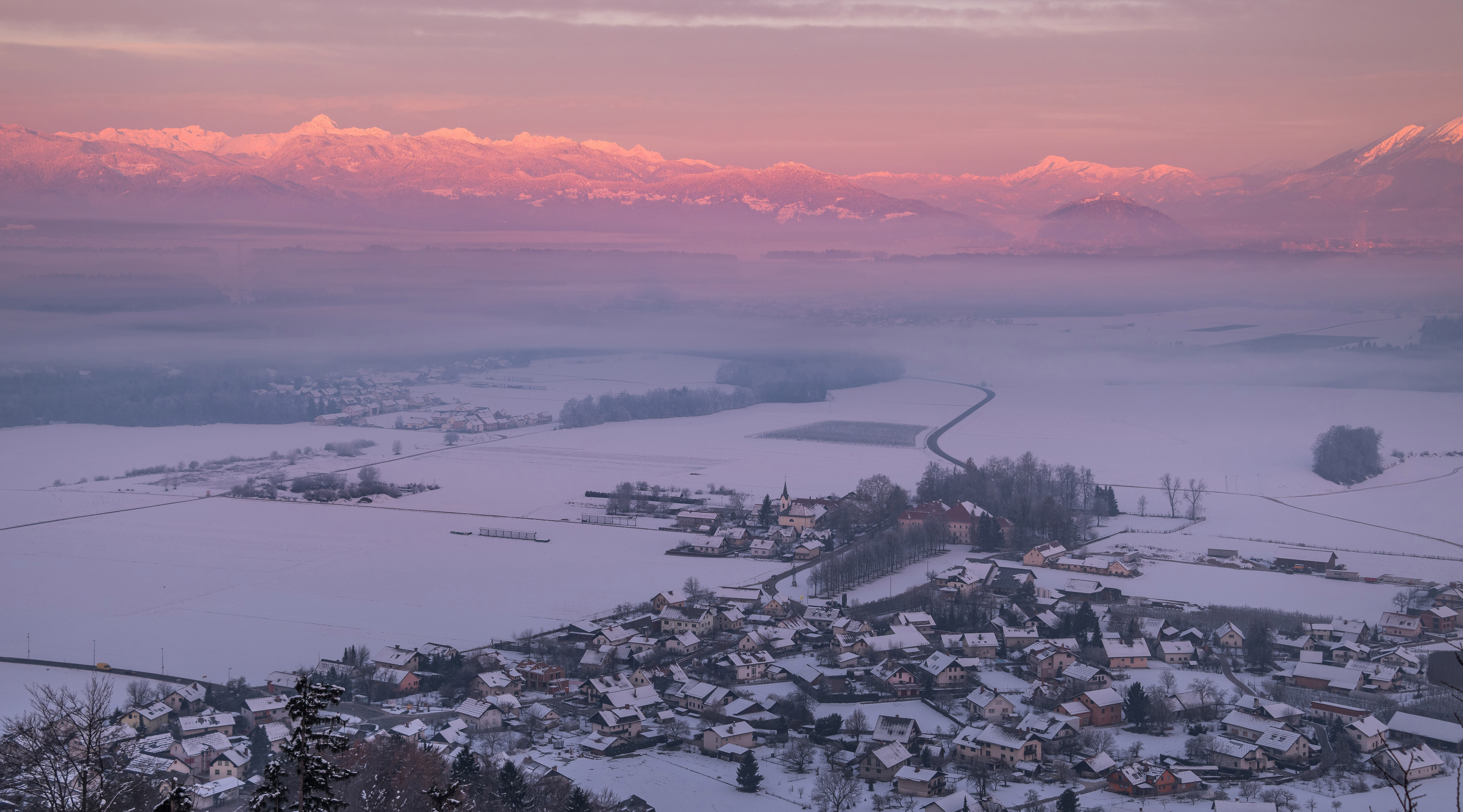

- Location of the Municipality of Medvode in Slovenia
- Coordinates: 46°08′N 14°26′E
- Country: Slovenia

Government
  - Mayor: Nejc Smole (Independent)

Area
  - Total: 77.6 km^{2} (30.0 sq mi)

Population (2016)
  - Total: 16,781
  - Density: 216/km^{2} (560/sq mi)
- Time zone: UTC+01 (CET)
  - Summer (DST): UTC+02 (CEST)
- Website: www.medvode.si

The Municipality of Medvode (pronounced [mɛˈdʋoːdɛ]; Slovene: Občina Medvode) is a municipality in the traditional region of Upper Carniola in north-central Slovenia. The seat of the municipality is the town of Medvode. Medvode became a municipality in 1994.

== Settlements ==
In addition to the municipal seat of Medvode, the municipality also includes the following settlements:

- Belo
- Brezovica pri Medvodah
- Dol
- Dragočajna
- Golo Brdo
- Goričane
- Hraše
- Ladja
- Moše
- Osolnik
- Rakovnik
- Seničica
- Setnica
- Smlednik
- Sora
- Spodnja Senica
- Spodnje Pirniče
- Studenčice
- Tehovec
- Topol pri Medvodah
- Trnovec
- Valburga
- Vaše
- Verje
- Vikrče
- Zavrh pod Šmarno Goro
- Zbilje
- Zgornja Senica
- Zgornje Pirniče
- Žlebe
