= Trnovec, Medvode =

Trnovec
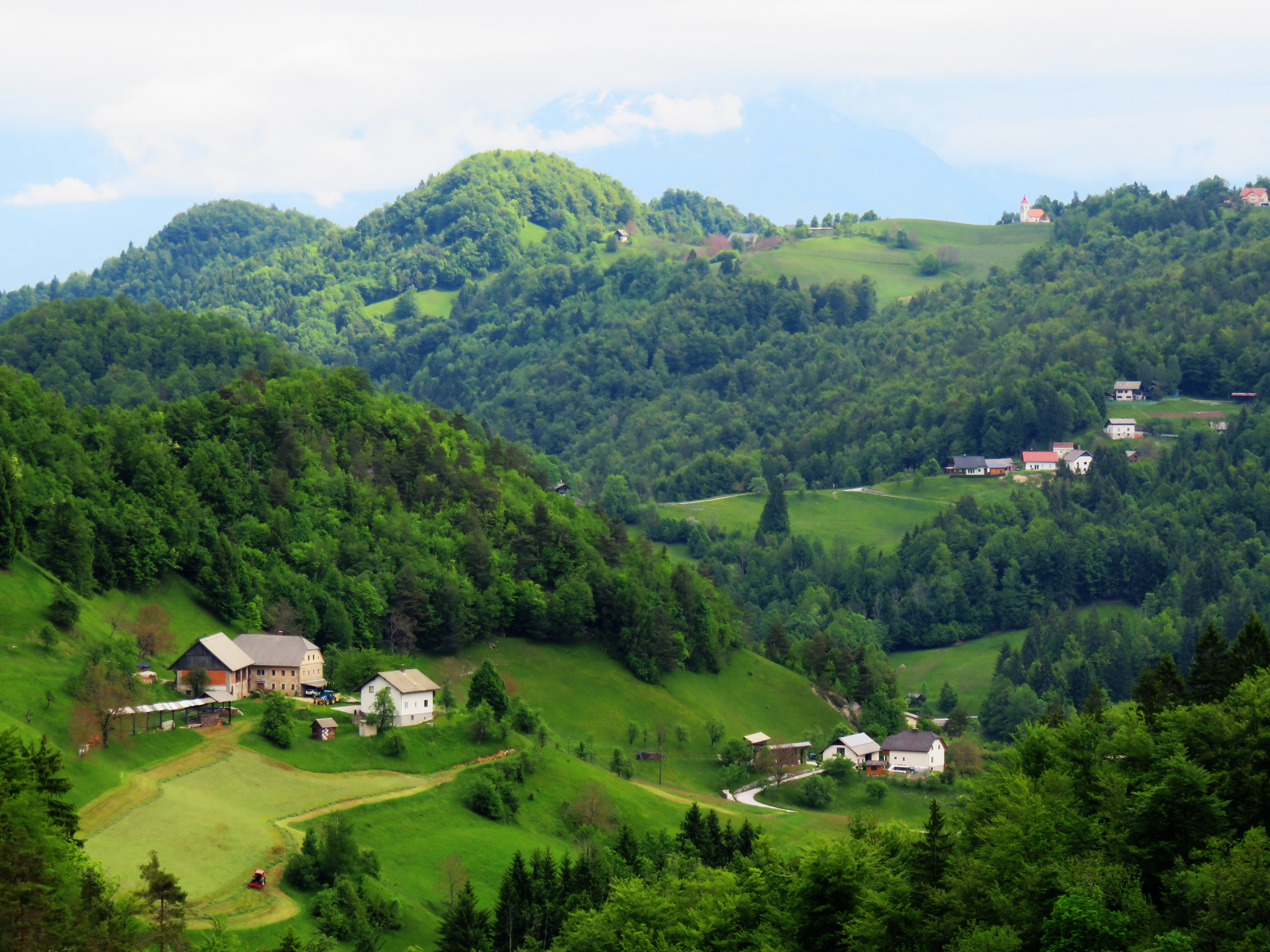
- Trnovec

- Location in Slovenia
- Coordinates: 46°6′18.53″N 14°21′3.72″E
- Country: Slovenia
- Traditional region: Upper Carniola
- Statistical region: Central Slovenia
- Municipality: Medvode

Area
  - Total: 5.61 km^{2} (2.17 sq mi)
- Elevation: 447.7 m (1,469 ft)

Population (2002)
  - Total: 130

Trnovec (pronounced [təɾˈnɔːʋəts] or [təɾˈnoːʋəts]) is a dispersed settlement in the hills southwest of Medvode in the Upper Carniola region of Slovenia.

== Name ==
The place name Trnovec (and related names such as Trnovce, Trnovče, Trnovci, and Trnovska vas) is common in Slovenia. It is derived from the common noun trn 'thorn', referring to a place where thorny brush grows.

== Gallery ==
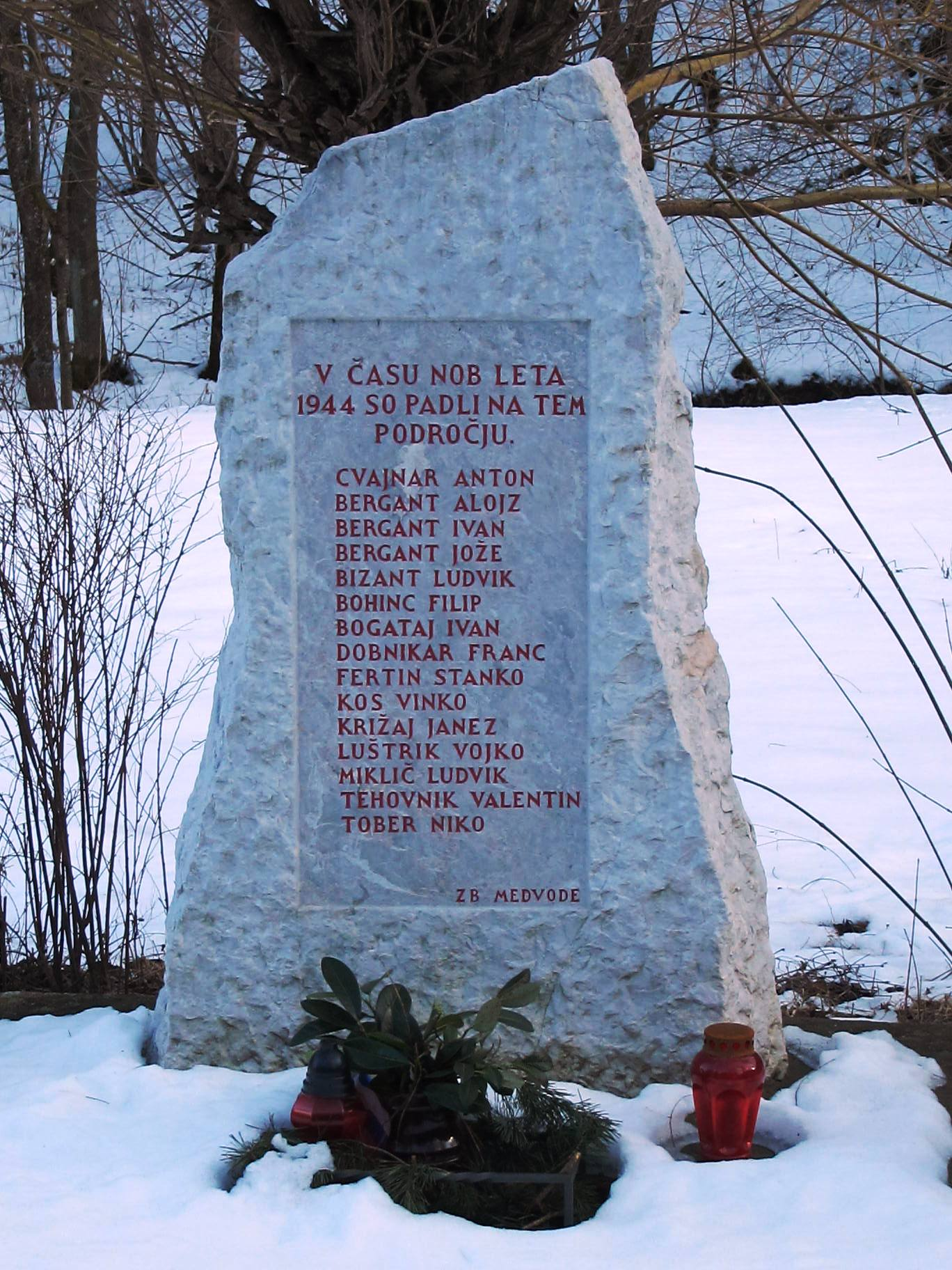
Partisan memorial in Trnovec
