= Vrhpolje, Vipava =

Vrhpolje
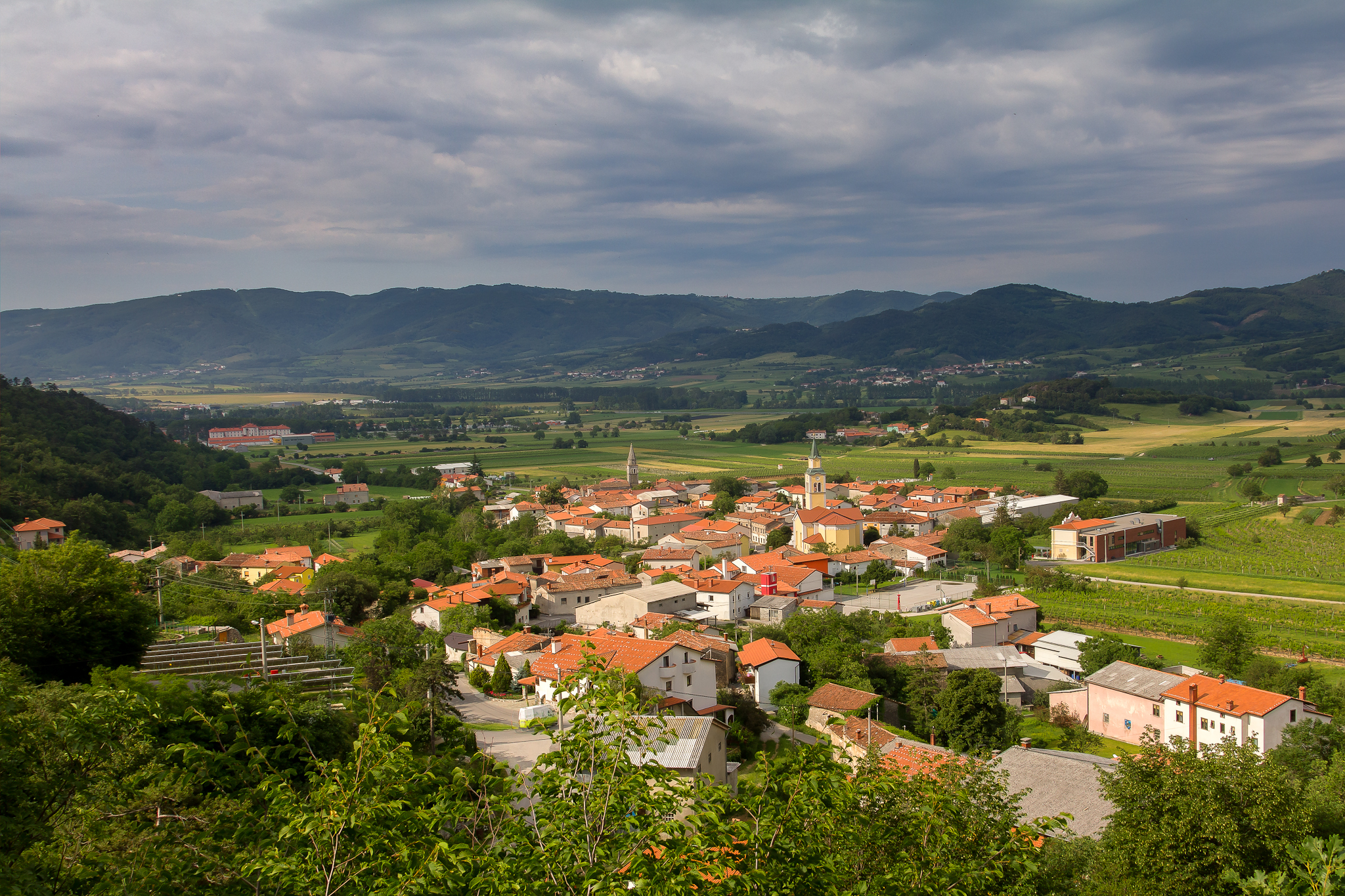

- Location in Slovenia
- Coordinates: 45°51′52.76″N 13°57′45.66″E
- Country: Slovenia
- Traditional region: Littoral
- Statistical region: Gorizia
- Municipality: Vipava

Area
  - Total: 4.31 km^{2} (1.66 sq mi)
- Elevation: 137.5 m (451 ft)

Population (2021)
  - Total: 600

Vrhpolje (pronounced [ʋəɾxˈpoːljɛ]) is a settlement in the Vipava Valley north of the town of Vipava in the Littoral region of Slovenia.

== Geography ==
Vrhpolje is a clustered village in the Upper Vipava Valley at the northwest foot of the Nanos Plateau. White Creek (Slovene: Bela), a tributary of the Vipava River, flows past the town to the east, but its bed is often dry because it is an influent stream. There are tilled fields in the low, flat areas toward Vipava, vineyards on the slopes to the north, and wooded land on the slopes of the Nanos Plateau to the east. There are karst caves in the vicinity.

== Clandestine graves ==
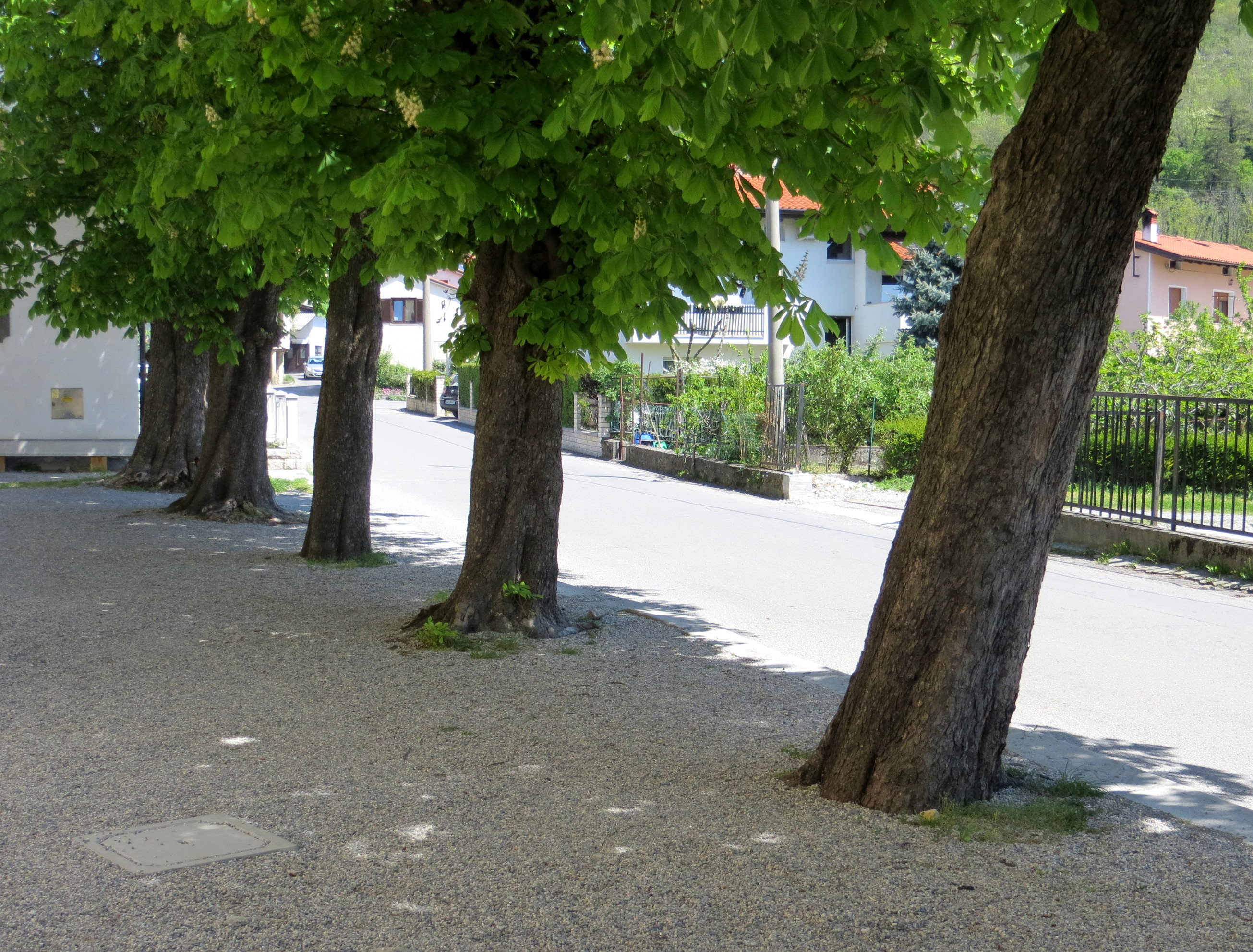
Church Grave

Vrhpolje is the site of two clandestine graves from the Second World War. The Church Grave (Slovene: Grobišče ob cerkvi) is located in the middle of the tree-lined avenue by the parish church. It contains the remains of a German soldier killed near Vipava during the war. The Zavetnik Farm Grave (Grobišče Zavetnikov grunt) lies in the woods below a vineyard, about 1 kilometer (0.62 mi) north-northeast of the parish church. It contains the remains of the Slovene civilian Marija Krapež from Malo Polje, who was murdered by the Partisans in November 1943.

== Church ==
The parish church in the settlement is dedicated to Saints Primus and Felician and belongs to the Koper Diocese.
