= Slap, Vipava =

Slap
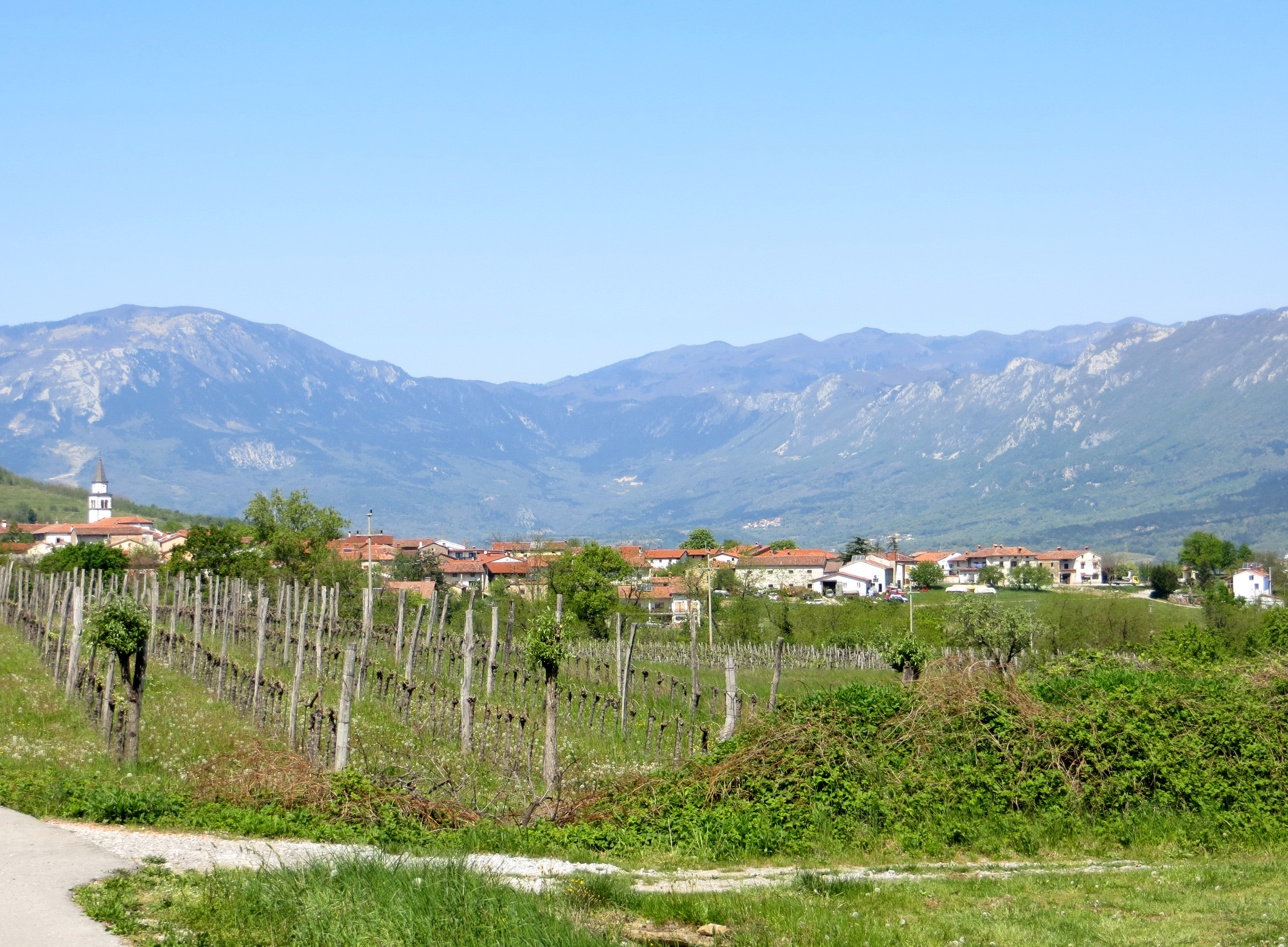

- Location in Slovenia
- Coordinates: 45°50′21.42″N 13°56′0.76″E
- Country: Slovenia
- Traditional region: Inner Carniola
- Statistical region: Gorizia
- Municipality: Vipava

Area
  - Total: 5.14 km^{2} (1.98 sq mi)
- Elevation: 132.3 m (434 ft)

Population (2002)
  - Total: 427

Slap (pronounced [ˈslaːp]) is a village in the Vipava Valley west of the town of Vipava in the traditional Inner Carniola region of Slovenia. It is now generally regarded as part of the Slovenian Littoral.

== Church ==
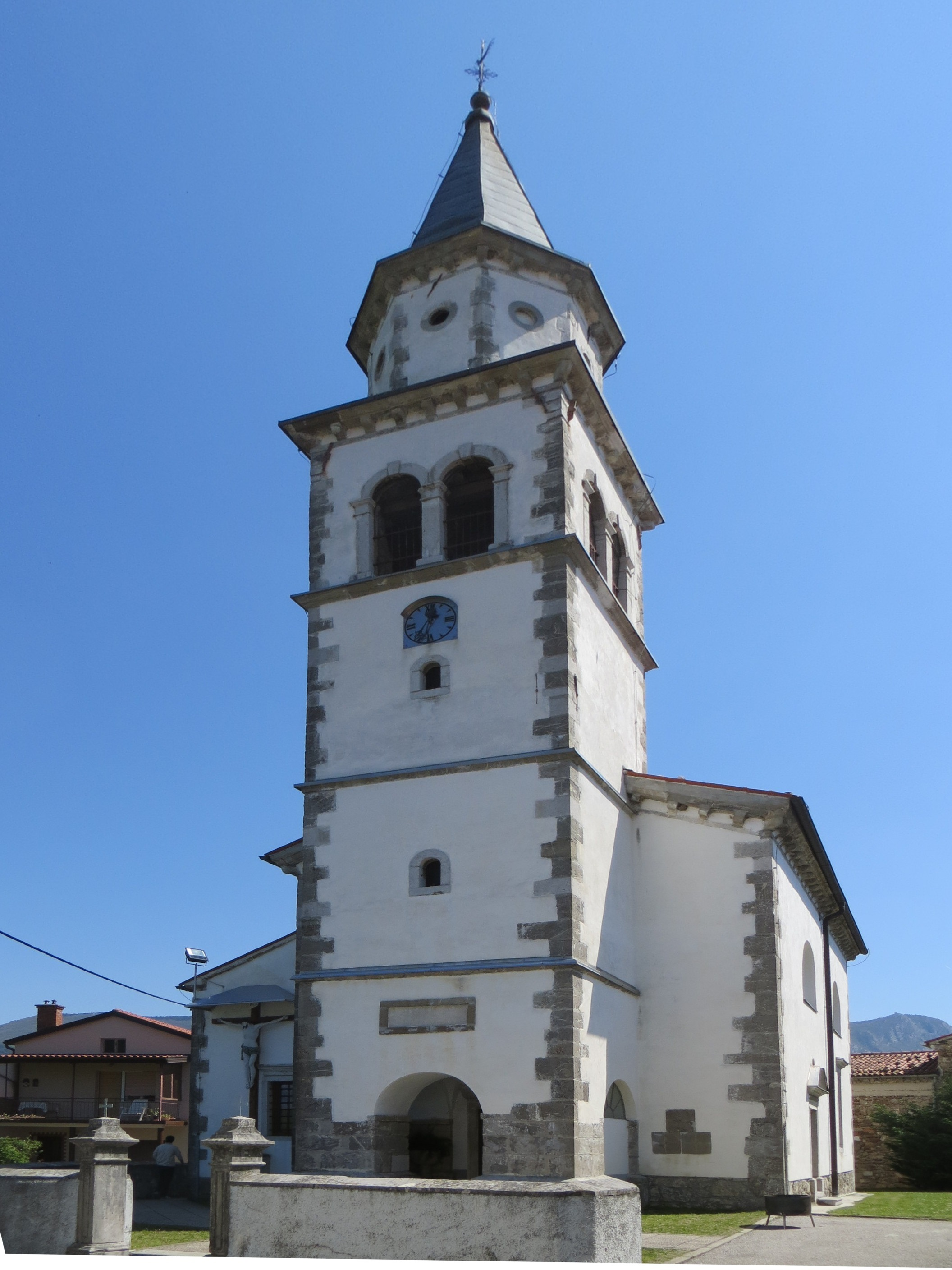
Saint Matthew's Church

The parish church in the settlement is dedicated to Saint Matthew and belongs to the Koper Diocese.
