= List of cities, towns, and villages in Slovenia: E =

This is a list of cities, towns, and villages in Slovenia, starting with E.

There is only one village in Slovenia with the first letter E.

Settlement	Municipality
Erzelj	Vipava
