= Marko Natlačen =

Slovenian politician (1886–1942)

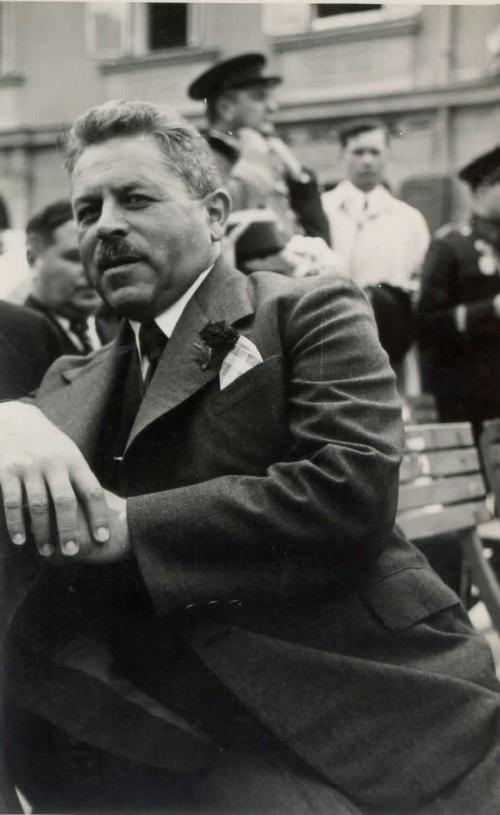
Marko Natlačen (1939)

Marko Natlačen (April 24, 1886 – October 13, 1942) was a Slovenian politician and jurist, who also served as the last ban (governor) of the Drava Banovina in the Kingdom of Yugoslavia. His assassination at the hands of the Slovenian Communist secret police (VOS) during World War II was an important event in the escalation of the armed conflict between the Slovenian partisans and the Slovenian paramilitary anti-revolutionary forces in the Province of Ljubljana. The role of Natlačen during World War II and the extent to which he collaborated with the Fascist Italian forces has been disputed.

== Biography ==
Natlačen was born in the village of Manče in the upper Vipava Valley, in what was then the Duchy of Carniola within the Austro-Hungarian Empire.

Natlačen finished his law studies in Vienna and then moved to Ljubljana, where he worked in a law firm. He was a member of the Slovene People's Party and an anticommunist. During the Second World War he founded the National Council of Slovenia (Slovene: Narodni svet za Slovenijo) together with the leaders of other political parties.

On April 6, Germany, Italy and Hungary invaded Slovenia. Natlačen and the mayor of Ljubljana greeted and handed the occupying Italian army the keys to the city. On April 12–14, Natlačen met with the German occupation army, asking them to create a Slovene quisling state, like the Independent State of Croatia. The Germans refused, and Germany, Italy and Hungary partitioned Slovenia. Germany annexed Styria to the Reich, while Italy annexed the Province of Ljubljana to Italy, instituted the Italian Fascist system, and forbade all Slovene political organizations. A day after the Italians annexed the Province of Ljubljana to Italy, Natlačen and a number of other Slovene politicians wrote a letter to Mussolini, congratulating him on the act.

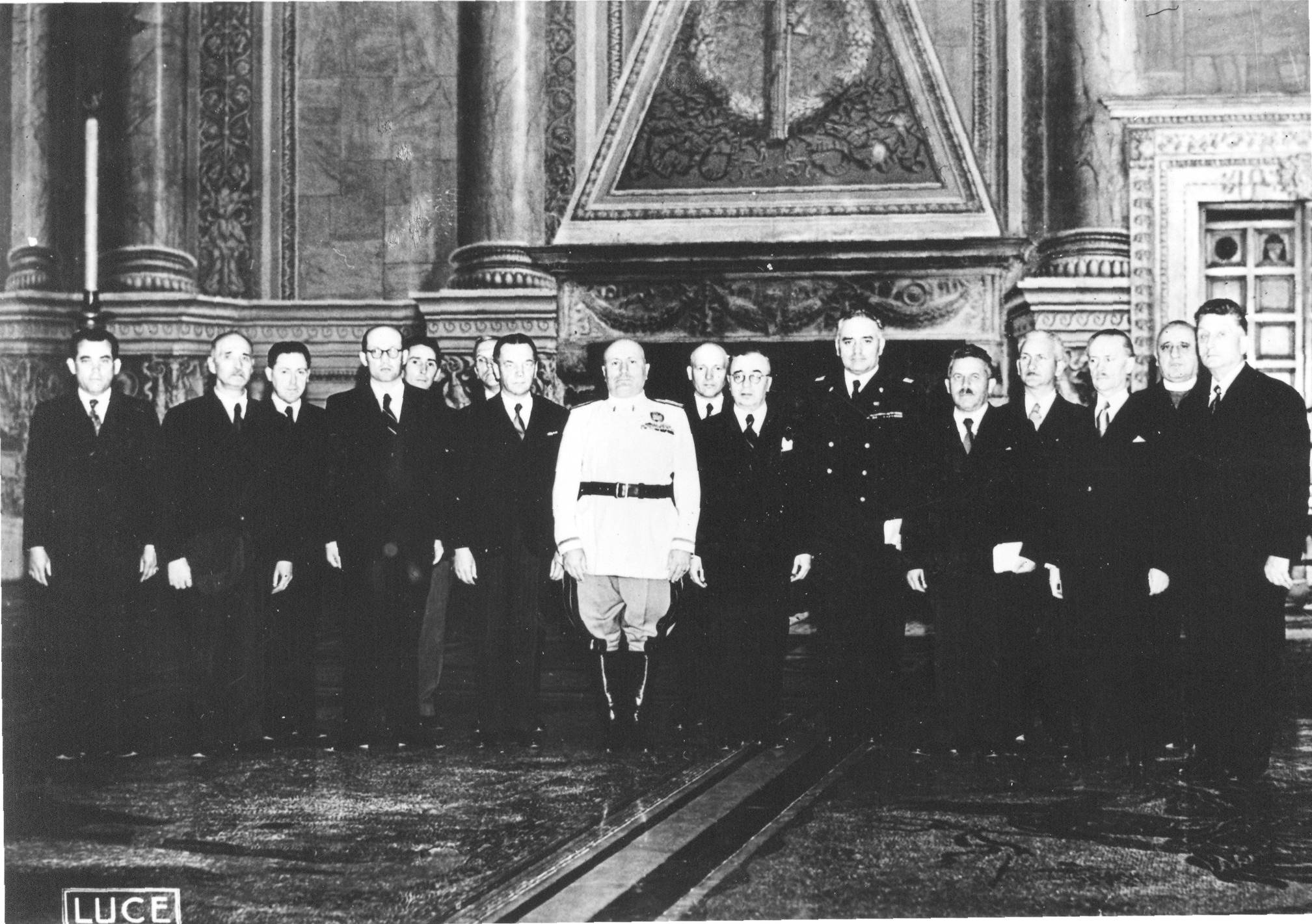
Marko Natlačen, meeting with Mussolini in Rome, June 8, 1941 (Natlačen, with mustache is to the right of Fascist Commissar of Ljubljana Province, Emilio Grazioli)

He initially accepted a position on the Fascist-established advisory council for the Province of Ljubljana, and on June 8 led a delegation to meet with Mussolini in Rome, after which he wrote Mussolini another letter expressing "complete loyalty". But he resigned later that year since he saw the Italians were not interested even in any advice from the council and his opposition to the Italian authorities and their unlawful treatment of people in the Province of Ljubljana. Together with the Albert Kramer of the Liberal Party, he helped draft the London Points (Slovene: Londonske točke) in October 1941, which stated that the goals of Slovene prewar parties was the renewal of the Kingdom of Yugoslavia, and designated the Chetnik army of Draža Mihailović as the only legal force, while all others, including the Partisans, were declared treasonous.

In 1942 Natlačen played a key role in establishing the MVAC, a Slovene collaborationist militia that fought under the command of the Italian fascist forces, having written in May 1942 a memorandum to the Italians suggesting the creation of such units. Natlačen was still the internal leader of the Slovene People's Party, when the party's army, the Slovene Legion, joined the Italian MVAC forces, to jointly fight with the Italian occupation army against the Partisans.

He was assassinated by a member of the VOS, Security and Intelligence Service, Franc Stadler, at the order of the Communist Party of Slovenia. Reflecting his importance to the collaborationist cause, the Fascist authorities in retaliation for Natlačen shot 24 Slovene hostages, suspected supporters of the Liberation Front. After the war the communist authorities desecrated his grave, exhumed his remains, and disposed of them at an unknown location.

== Controversies ==
Natlačen published the anti-Serb xenophobic poem Srbe na vrbe (Hang the Serbs on the Willow Trees) in the Ljubljana newspaper Slovenec on July 27, 1914, the day before Austria-Hungary declared war against the Kingdom of Serbia.

In 2007, Ivan Princes, the mayor of Vipava, where Natlačen's birth village of Manče is located, tried to dedicate a bust statue to Natlačen, but abandoned the plan because the local inhabitants ended being "universally opposed" to the monument, in view of Natlačen's WWII collaborationist role. Mayor Princes cancelled the planned ceremony after SDS MP Eva Irgl, NSi President and Finance Minister Andrej Bajuk withdrew their participation in the unveiling of the monument.
