= Lozice, Vipava =

Lozice
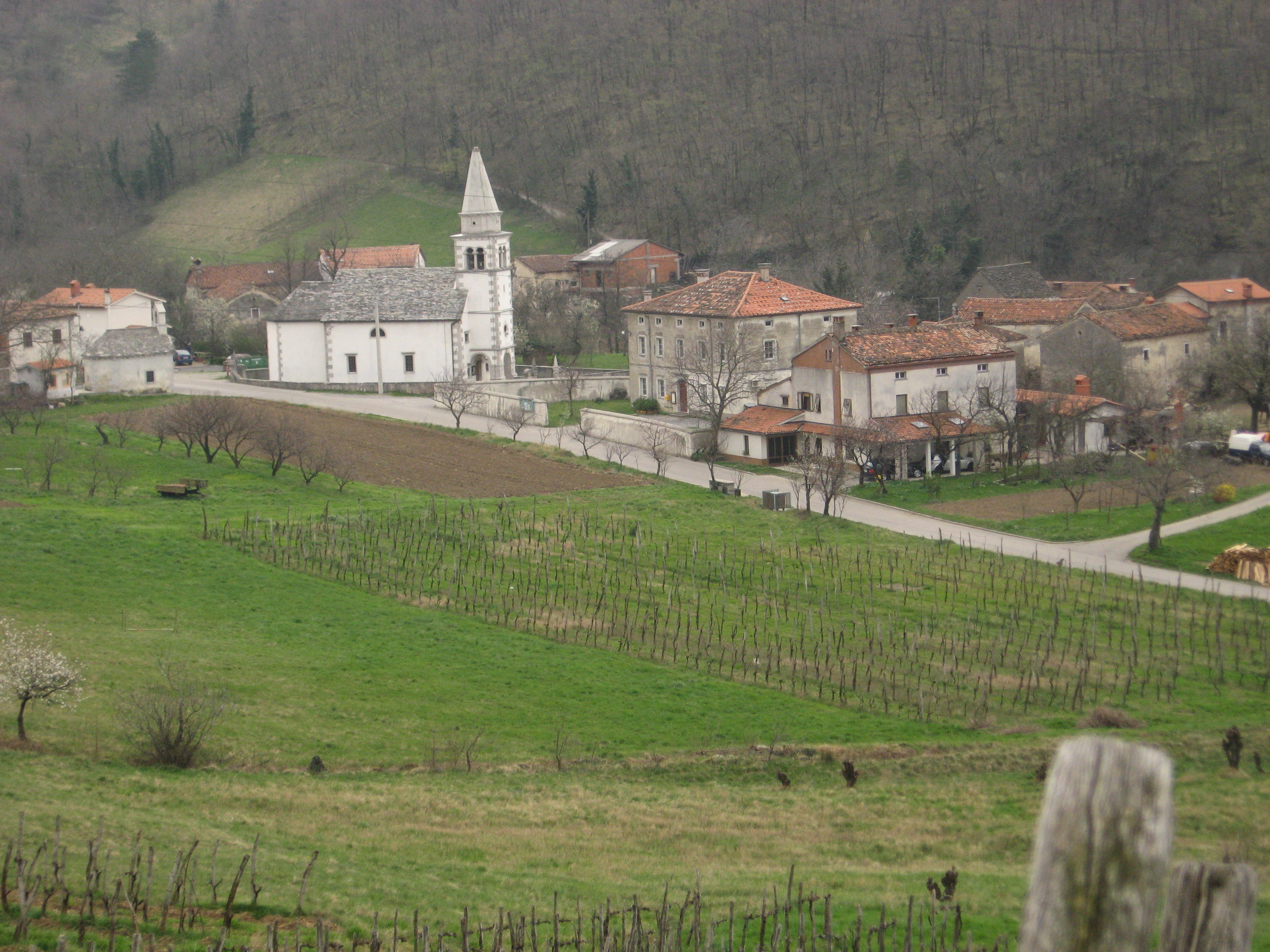

- Location in Slovenia
- Coordinates: 45°46′50.43″N 13°59′59.5″E
- Country: Slovenia
- Traditional region: Littoral
- Statistical region: Gorizia
- Municipality: Vipava

Area
  - Total: 8.36 km^{2} (3.23 sq mi)
- Elevation: 227.6 m (747 ft)

Population (2002)
  - Total: 213

Lozice (pronounced [lɔˈziːtsɛ]) is a village in the upper Vipava Valley, under the western slopes of Mount Nanos in the Municipality of Vipava in the Littoral region of Slovenia.

== Church ==
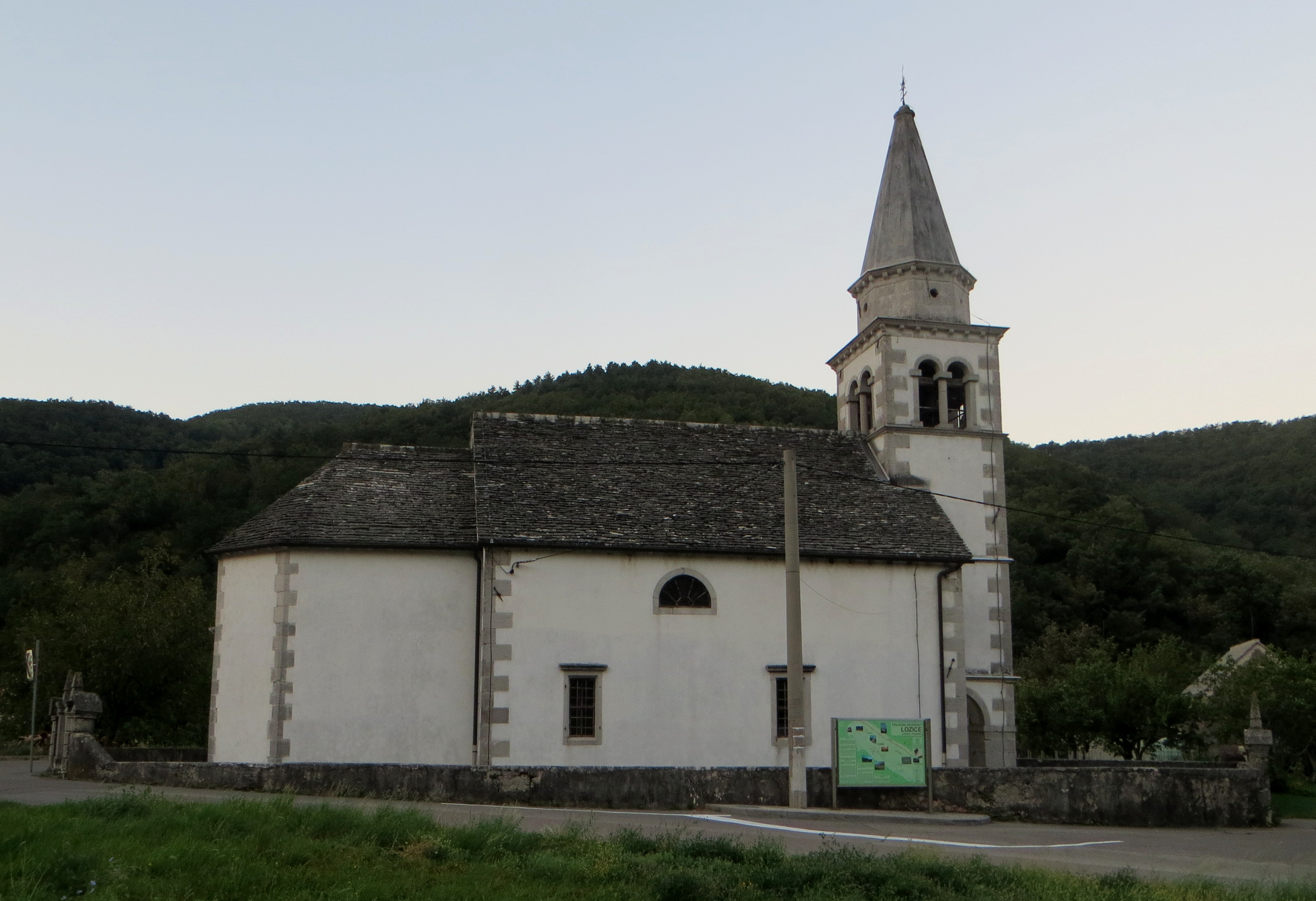
Saint Francis Xavier Church

The parish church in the settlement is dedicated to Saint Francis Xavier and belongs to the Koper Diocese.
