= Podraga =

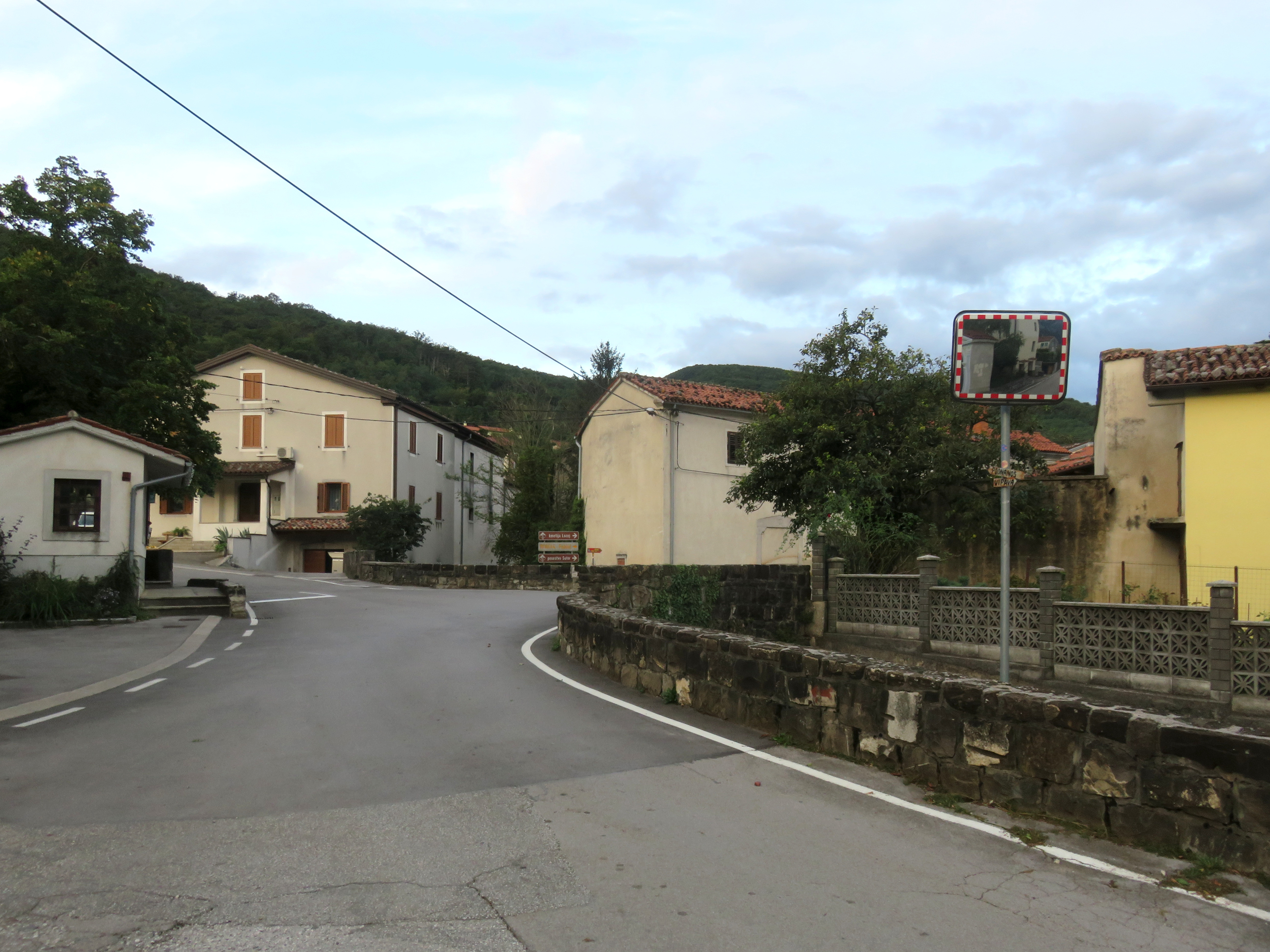

- Location in Slovenia
- Coordinates: 45°48′22.08″N 13°56′55.83″E
- Country: Slovenia
- Traditional region: Inner Carniola
- Statistical region: Gorizia
- Municipality: Vipava

Area
  - Total: 6.97 km^{2} (2.69 sq mi)
- Elevation: 176.7 m (580 ft)

Population (2002)
  - Total: 314

Podraga (pronounced [pɔˈdɾaːɡa]) is a village in the upper Vipava Valley in the Municipality of Vipava in the traditional Inner Carniola region of Slovenia. It is now generally regarded as part of the Slovenian Littoral.

The parish church in the settlement is dedicated to Saints Hermagoras and Fortunatus and belongs to the Koper Diocese.
