= Gradišče pri Vipavi =

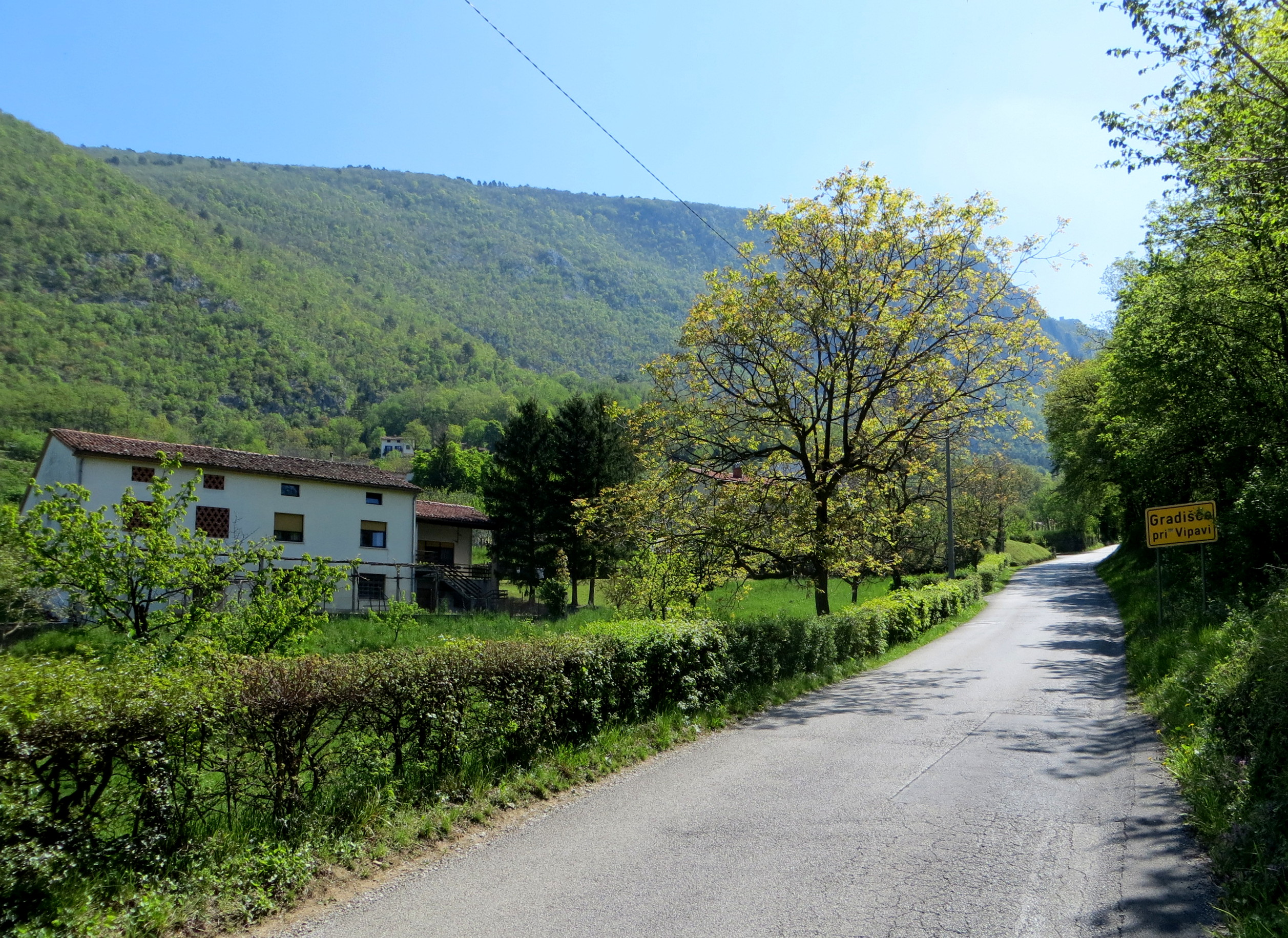

- Location in Slovenia
- Coordinates: 45°50′6.58″N 13°57′53.19″E
- Country: Slovenia
- Traditional region: Littoral
- Statistical region: Gorizia
- Municipality: Vipava

Area
  - Total: 3.77 km^{2} (1.46 sq mi)
- Elevation: 152.6 m (501 ft)

Population (2002)
  - Total: 239

Gradišče pri Vipavi (pronounced [ɡɾaˈdiːʃtʃɛ pɾi ʋiˈpaːʋi]) is a village close to the source of the Vipava River, just south of the town of Vipava in the Littoral region of Slovenia.

== Name ==
The name of the settlement was changed from Gradišče to Gradišče pri Vipavi in 1953.

== Church ==
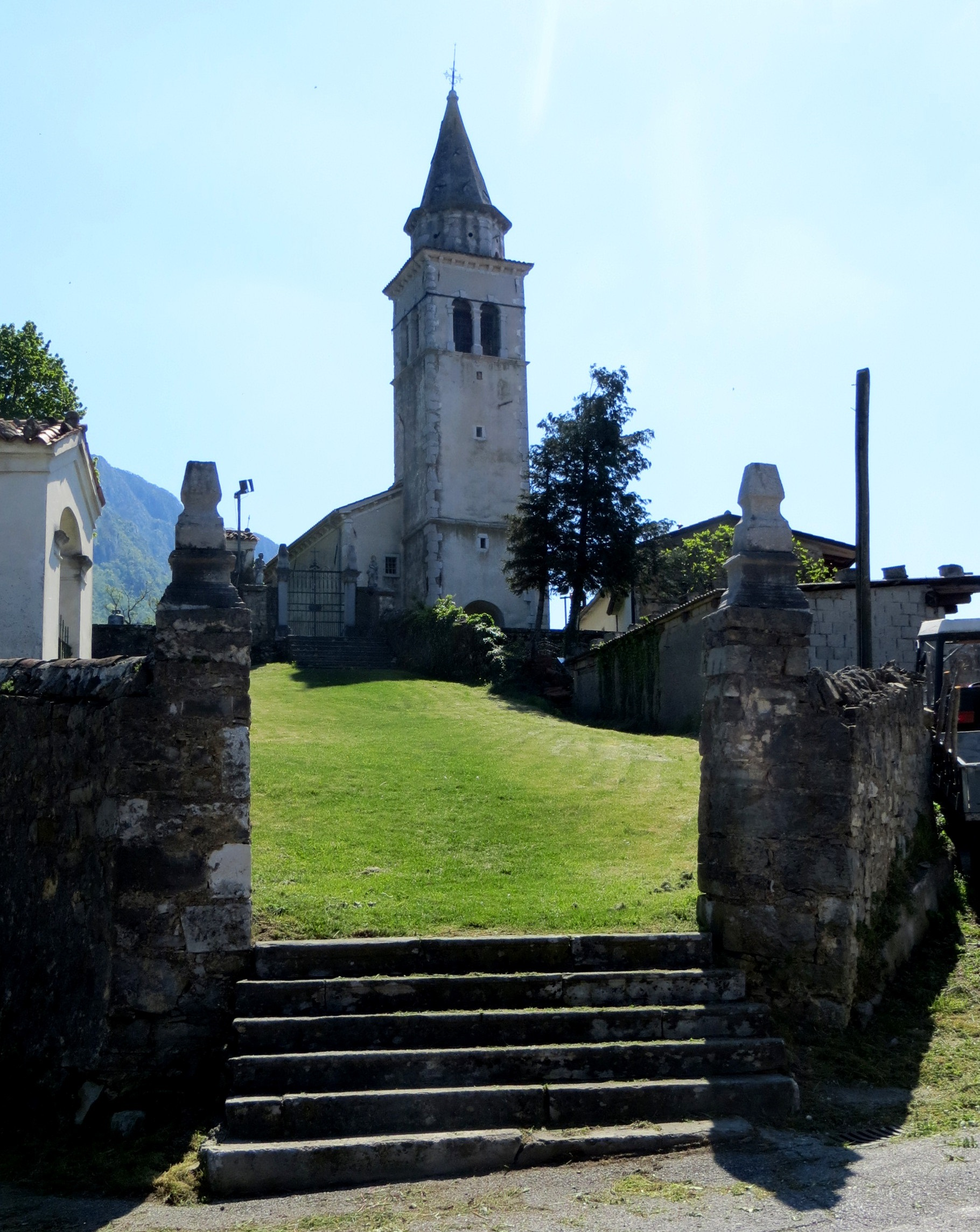
Holy Cross Church

The local church in the settlement is dedicated to the Holy Cross and belongs to the Parish of Vipava.
