= Manče =

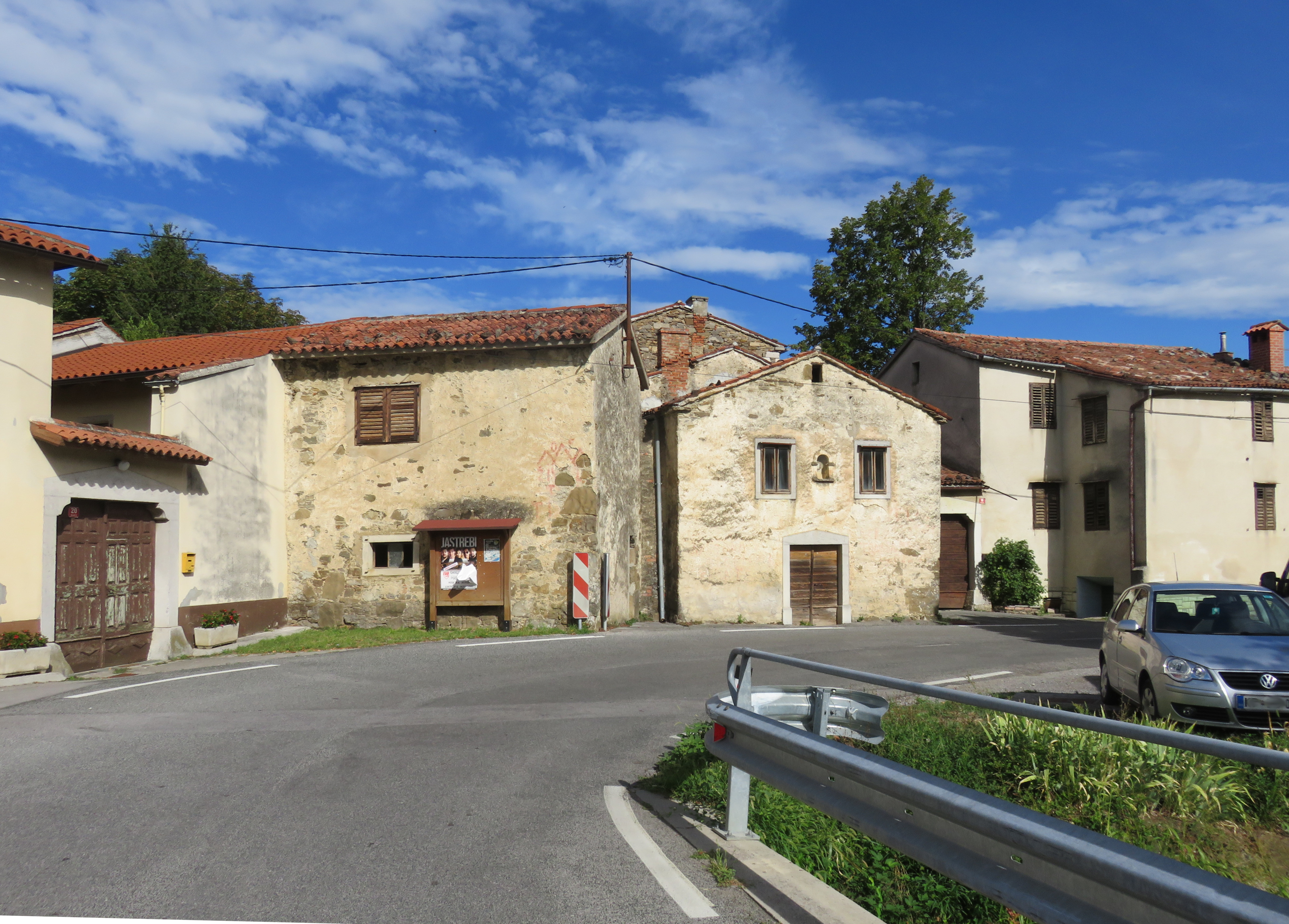

- Location in Slovenia
- Coordinates: 45°49′13.59″N 13°56′21.04″E
- Country: Slovenia
- Traditional region: Littoral
- Statistical region: Gorizia
- Municipality: Vipava

Area
  - Total: 2.14 km^{2} (0.83 sq mi)
- Elevation: 133.6 m (438 ft)

Population (2002)
  - Total: 140

Manče (pronounced [ˈmaːntʃɛ]) is a village in the upper Vipava Valley in the Municipality of Vipava in the Littoral region of Slovenia.

== Church ==
A small church built above the village in the 1990s was dedicated to Saint Martin in 2000 and is privately owned.

== Notable people ==
Notable people that were born or lived in Manče include:

- Marko Natlačen (1886–1942), politician
