= Podnanos =

Village in western Slovenia

Podnanos Šent Vid (until 1952), Šembid (local)
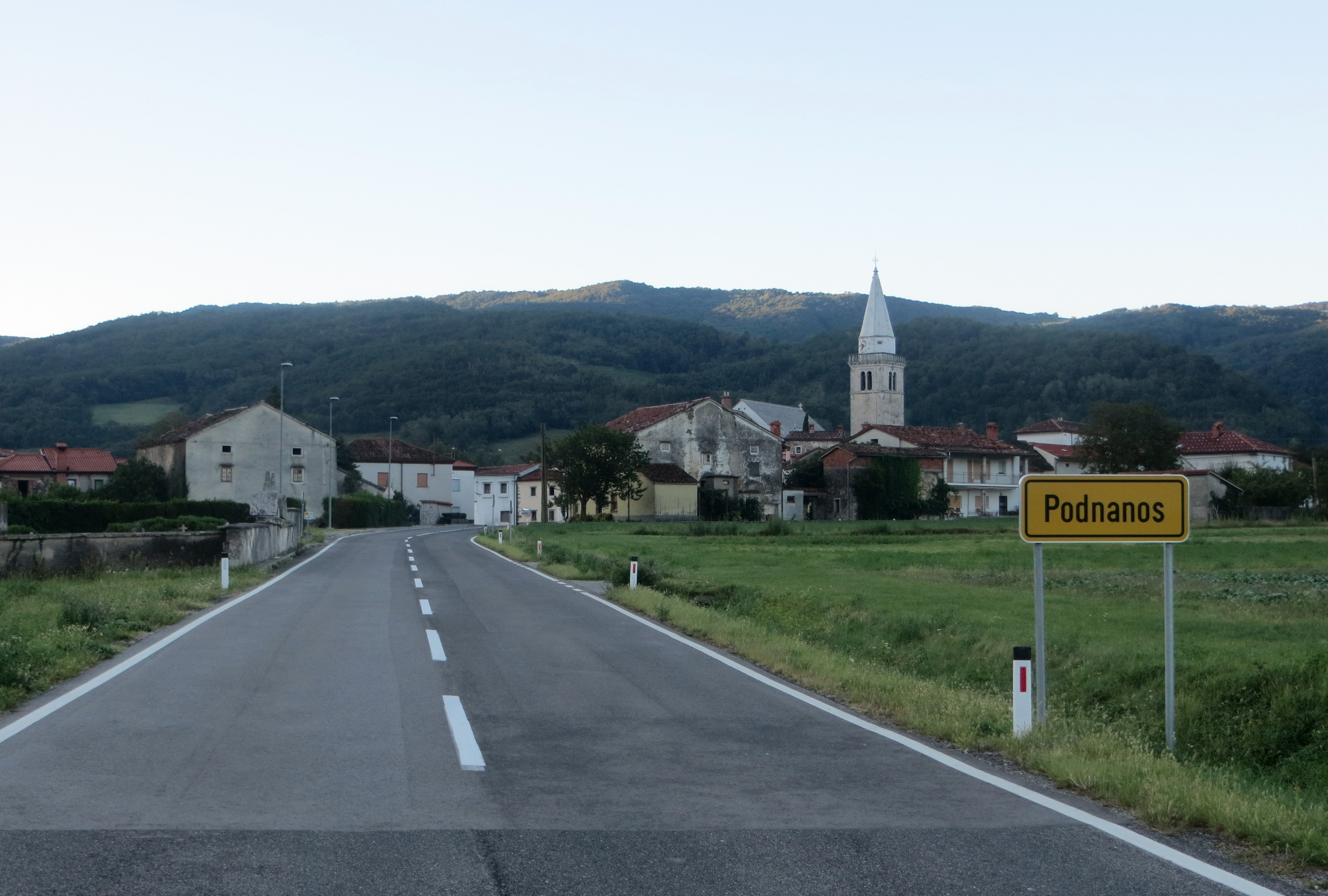

- Location in Slovenia
- Coordinates: 45°47′50.11″N 13°58′18.4″E
- Country: Slovenia
- Traditional region: Inner Carniola
- Statistical region: Gorizia
- Municipality: Vipava

Area
  - Total: 1.36 km^{2} (0.53 sq mi)
- Elevation: 169.2 m (555 ft)

Population (2002)
  - Total: 364

Podnanos (pronounced [pɔˈdnaːnɔs]; formerly Šent Vid or Šentvid (nad Vipavo), German: Sct. Veit, Italian: San Vito di Vipacco) is a village in the upper Vipava Valley in the Municipality of Vipava in the traditional Inner Carniola region of Slovenia. It is now generally regarded as part of the Slovenian Littoral. It lies below Mount Nanos, from which it gets its current name.

== Name ==
The name of the settlement was changed from Šent Vid (literally, 'Saint Vitus') to Podnanos (literally, 'below Nanos') in 1952. The name was changed on the basis of the 1948 Law on Names of Settlements and Designations of Squares, Streets, and Buildings as part of an effort by Slovenia's postwar communist government to remove religious elements from toponyms. The local name of the settlement, Šembid, is derived from Šent Vid.

== Churches ==
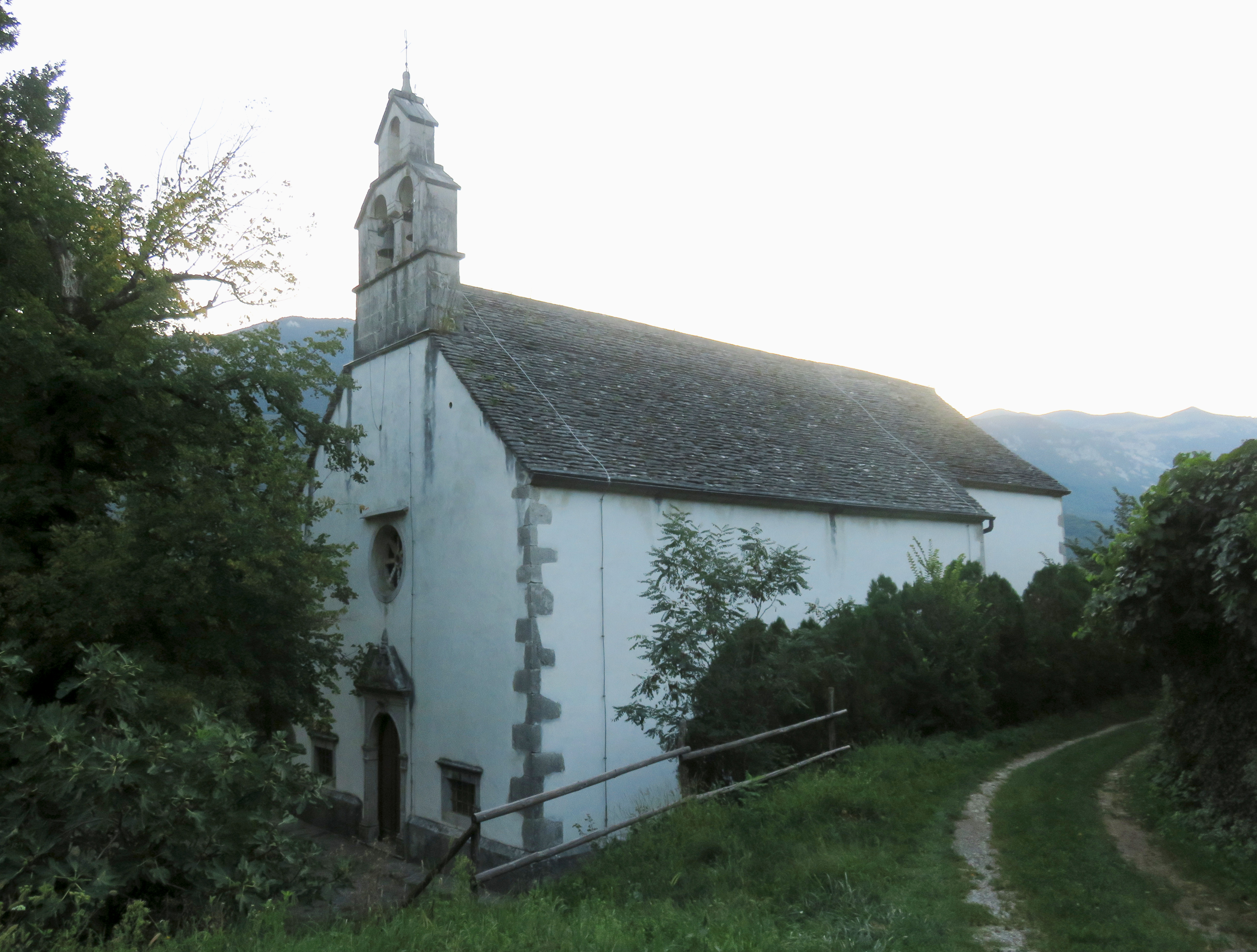
Saints Cosmas and Damian Church

The parish church in the settlement is dedicated to Saint Vitus and belongs to the Koper Diocese. A second church, dedicated to Saints Cosmas and Damian, stands northwest of the village center.

== Other cultural heritage ==
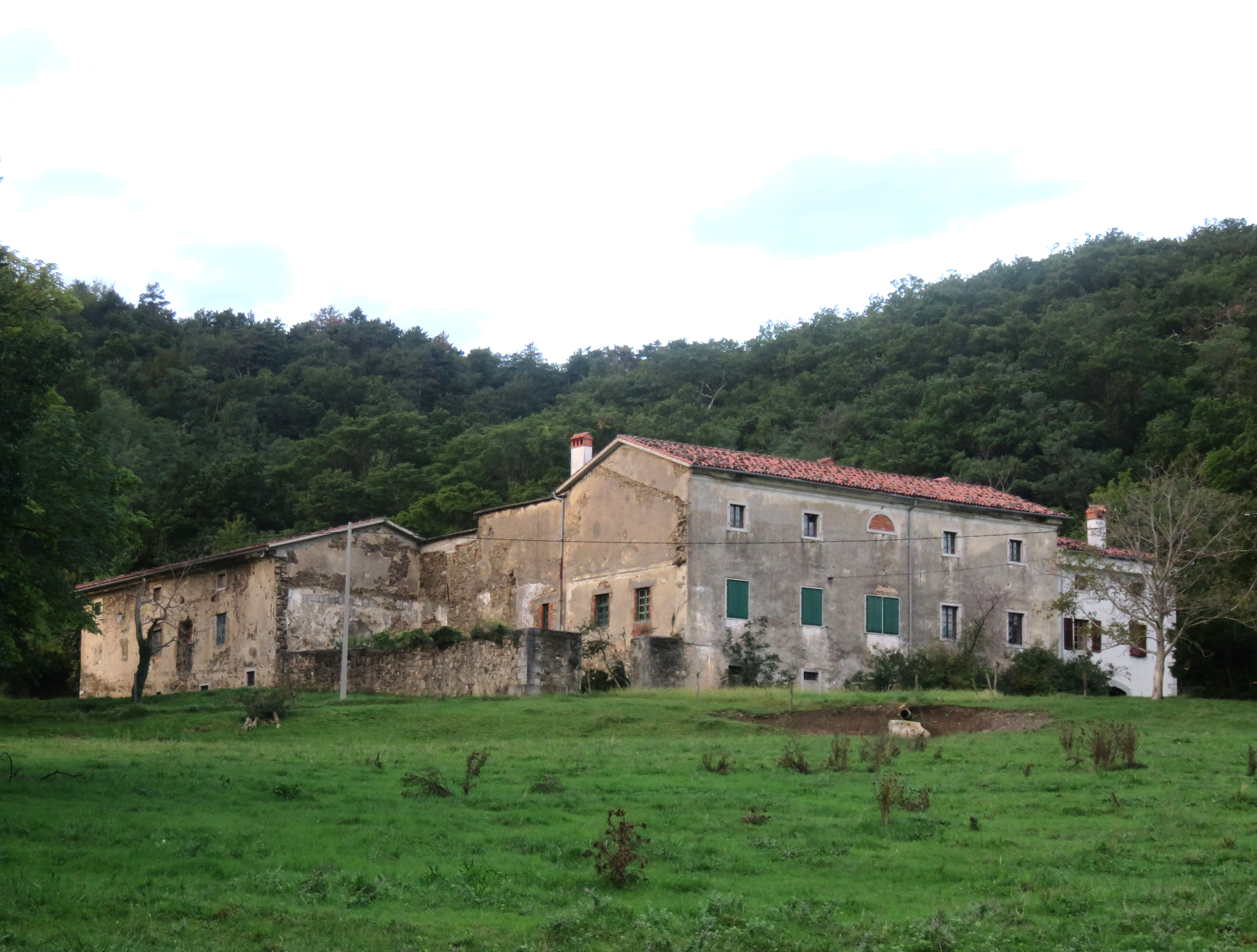
Roženek Manor

In addition to the churches in Podnanos, other cultural heritage includes the following:

- Roženek Manor (Slovene: Vila Roženek, German: Roseneck), also known as Dolenc Manor (Slovene: Dolenčeva graščina), is a rural structure located northwest of Saints Cosmas and Damian Church in the hamlet of Podbrje. It has a rectangular layout and an internal courtyard. On the south side there is an outbuilding with a pergola with stone columns. The manor dates from the 17th century.
- Schiwitzhofen Manor (Slovene: Vila Schiwitzhofen), also known as Živec Manor (Slovene: Živčeva graščina), is a rural structure located southeast of Saints Cosmas and Damian Church in the hamlet of Podbrje. It features stone door frames, window frames, and a cantilevered cornice. It has a long rectangular layout consisting of a residential building with a small arcaded courtyard, an outbuilding, and a garden. The manor dates from the 17th century.

== Notable residents ==
- Stanko Premrl (1880–1965), priest and composer of the national anthem of Slovenia
- Janko Premrl (nom de guerre Vojko, 1920–1943), anti-fascist resistance fighter and organizer of the Slovenian Partisan movement in the Slovenian Littoral
- Igor Rosa, slovenian motorcycle and industrial designer (Tomos)
