= Erzelj =

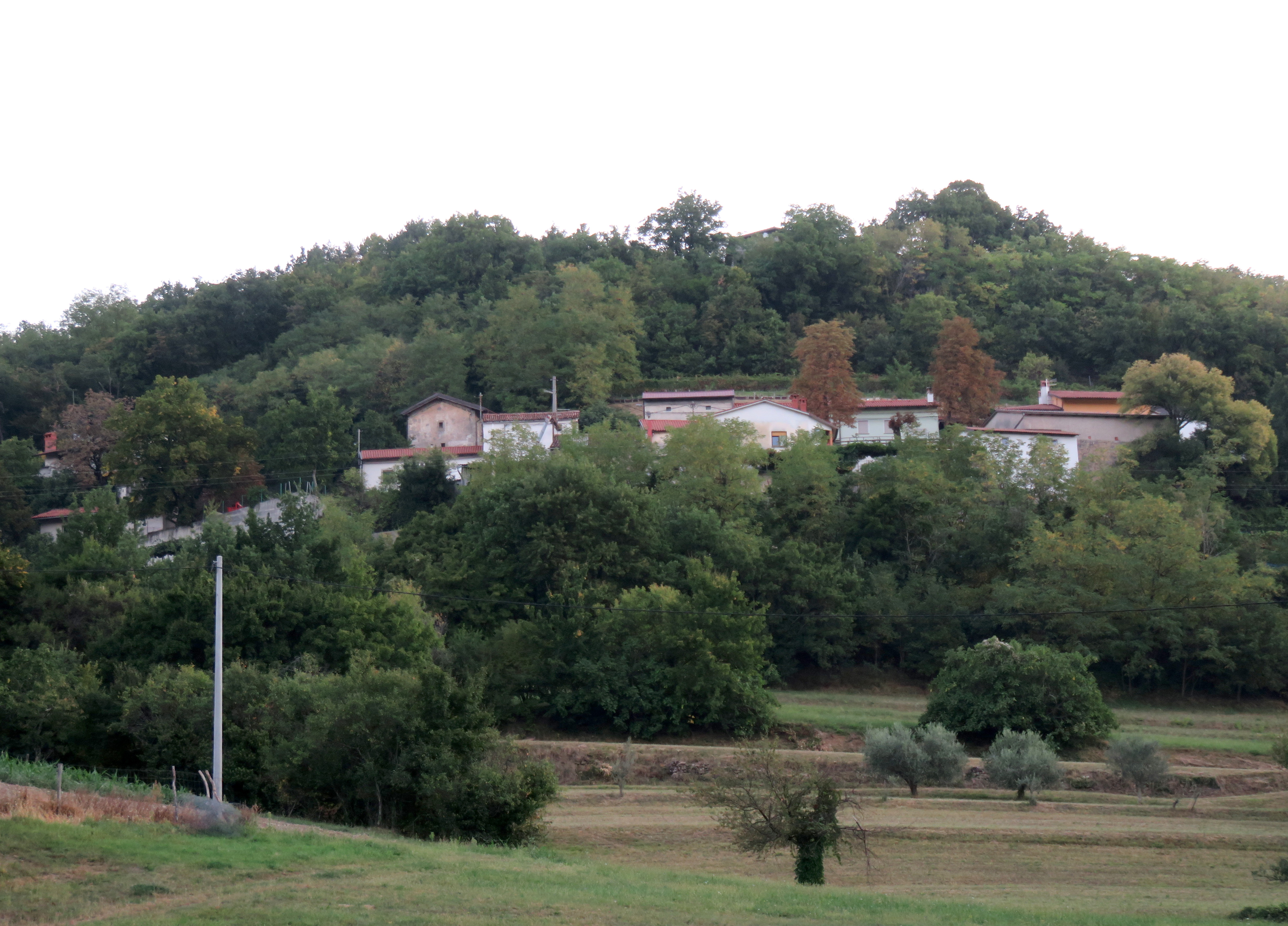

- Location in Slovenia
- Coordinates: 45°49′56.58″N 13°54′28.09″E
- Country: Slovenia
- Traditional region: Inner Carniola
- Statistical region: Gorizia
- Municipality: Vipava

Area
  - Total: 3.84 km^{2} (1.48 sq mi)
- Elevation: 323.4 m (1,061 ft)

Population (2024)
  - Total: 101

Erzelj (pronounced [ɛɾˈzɛl], in older sources sometimes Rzel; German: Ersel) is a village in the hills west of Vipava in the traditional Inner Carniola region of Slovenia. It is now generally regarded as part of the Slovenian Littoral. It was first mentioned in written documents dating to 1275.

== Name ==
Erzelj was attested in historical documents as Sanctus Michael in 1275, Mersel and Reseglum in 1346, Erseb in 1367, Ersel in 1377, Vosel in 1490, and Arsell in 1499, among other variants. The initial E- is believed to reflect the older orthographic norm in Slovene, representing the name *Rzelj. The origin of the name is uncertain: it is not derived from Romance orsello 'bear cub', and it cannot be reliably derived from a personal name or saint's name.

== Churches ==
There are two local churches in the settlement, belonging to the parish of Goče. Both are 15th-century buildings standing on Tabor Hill, and both were originally designed in the Gothic style and in the 18th century redesigned in the Baroque style. On the top of the hill stands St. Michael's Church, and at the foot of the hill stands St. Lawrence's Church.

== Gallery ==
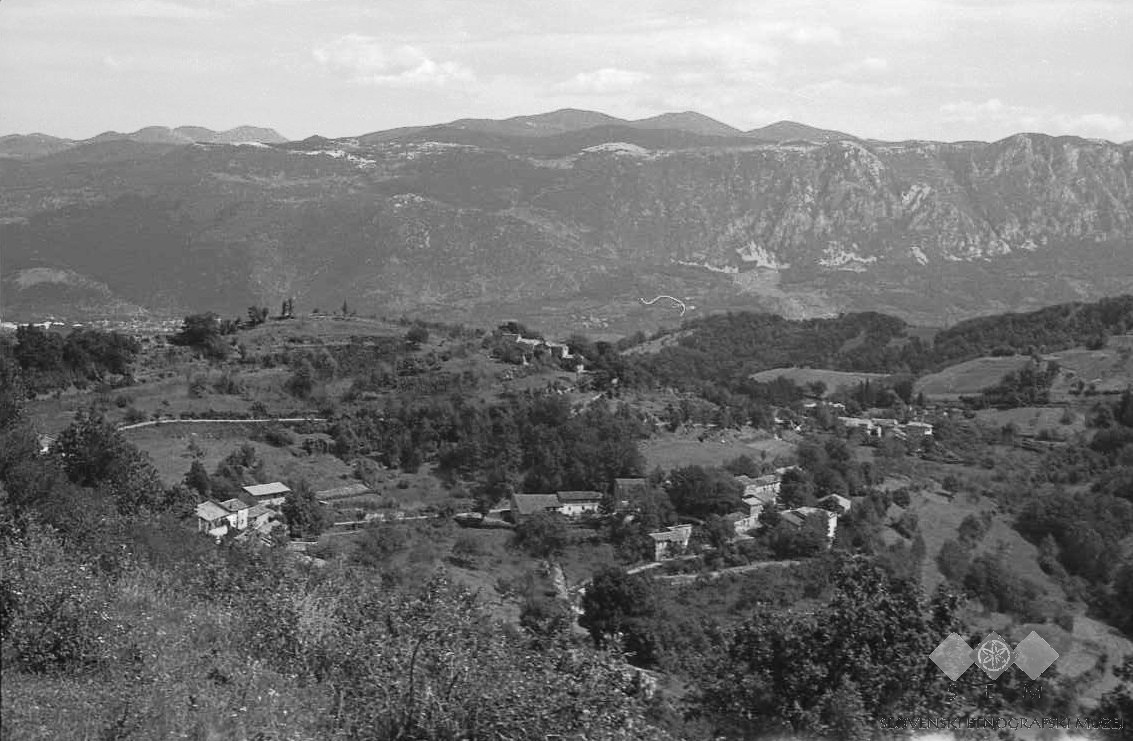
Erzelj in 1958 (hamlets of Miški, Volki, and Mesesneli)
