= Municipality of Vipava =

Municipality of Slovenia

Municipality of Vipava Občina Vipava
- Municipality
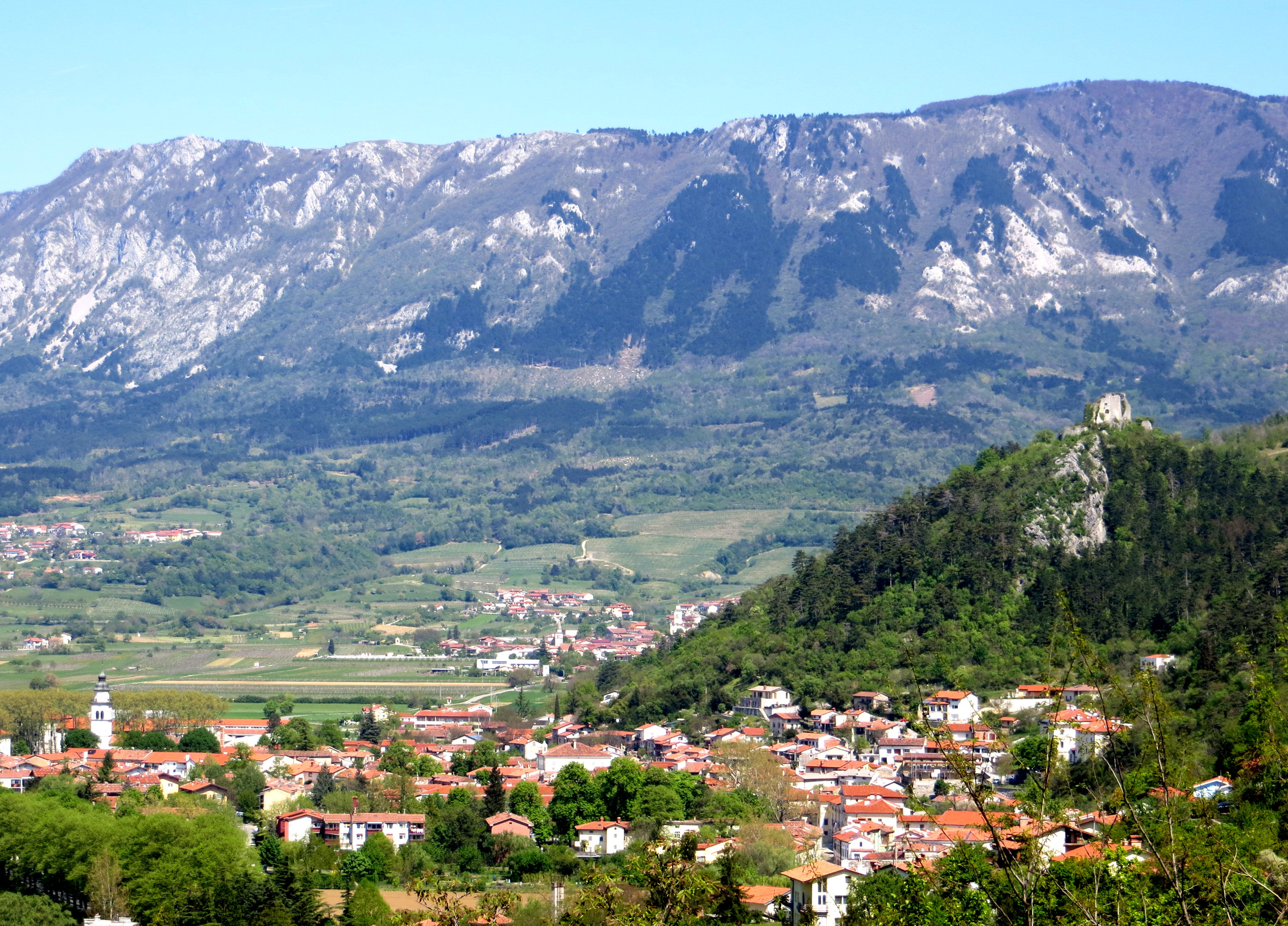

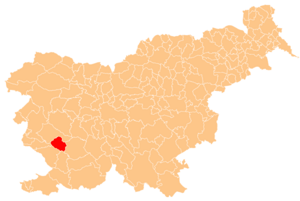
- Location of the Municipality of Vipava in Slovenia
- Coordinates: 45°51′N 13°58′E
- Country: Slovenia

Government
  - Mayor: Goran Kodelja

Area
  - Total: 107.4 km^{2} (41.5 sq mi)

Population (2010)
  - Total: 5,344
  - Density: 49.76/km^{2} (128.9/sq mi)
- Time zone: UTC+01 (CET)
  - Summer (DST): UTC+02 (CEST)

The Municipality of Vipava (pronounced [ʋiˈpaːʋa]; Slovene: Občina Vipava) is a municipality in western Slovenia. The seat of the municipality is the town of Vipava. Historically, it used to be a part of the traditional region of Inner Carniola, but it is now generally regarded as a part of the Slovenian Littoral. The municipality was established in its current form on 3 October 1994, when the former larger Municipality of Ajdovščina was subdivided into the municipalities of Ajdovščina and Vipava.

== Division ==
The Municipality of Vipava is subdivided into 11 local communities (Slovene: krajevne skupnosti), which comprise one or more villages. They are Vipava, Erzelj, Goče, Gradišče pri Vipavi, Lozice, Lože, Manče, Podnanos, Podraga, Slap, and Vrhpolje.
