= Vipava Valley =

Valley in Slovenia

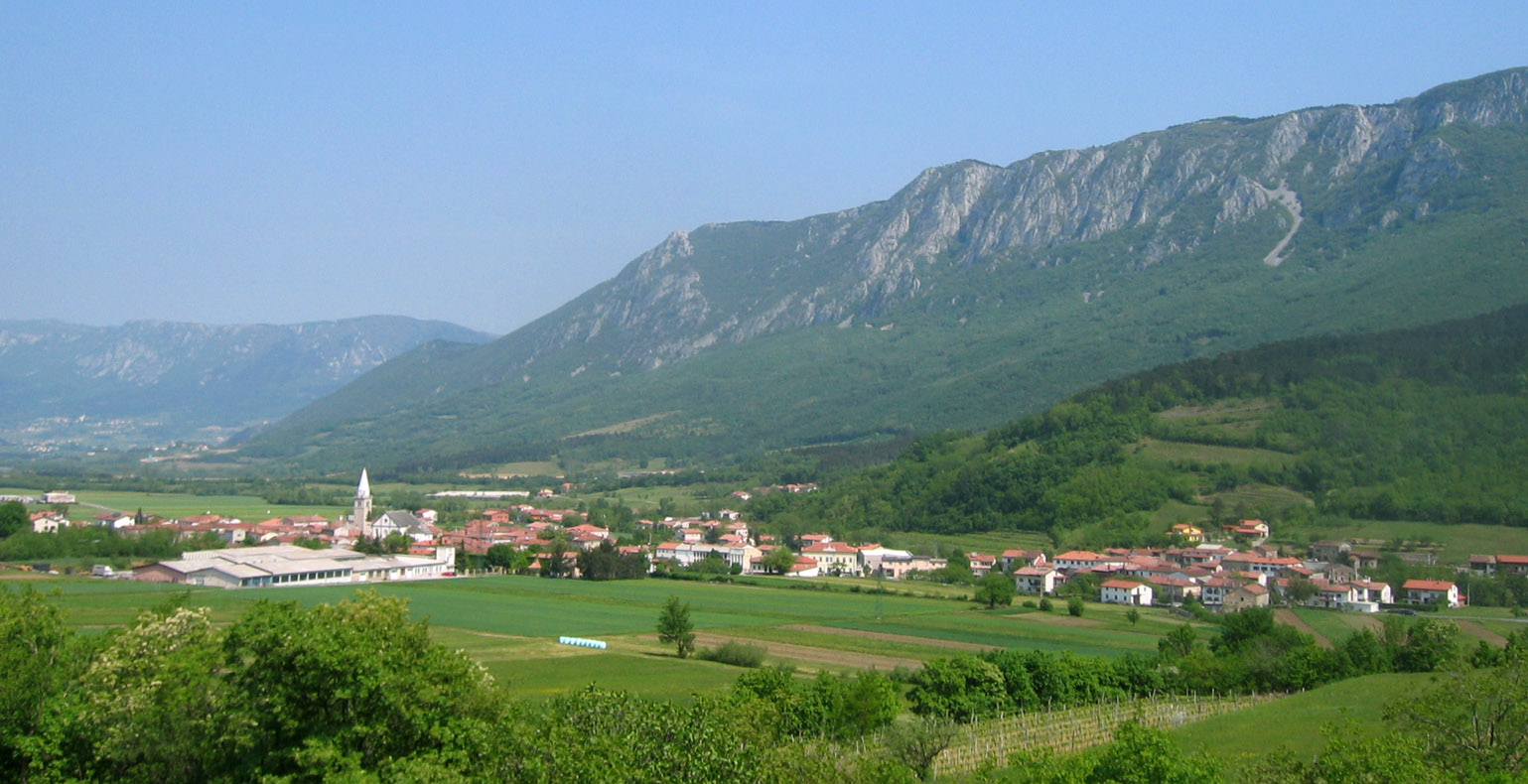
- The Vipava Valley at Podnanos

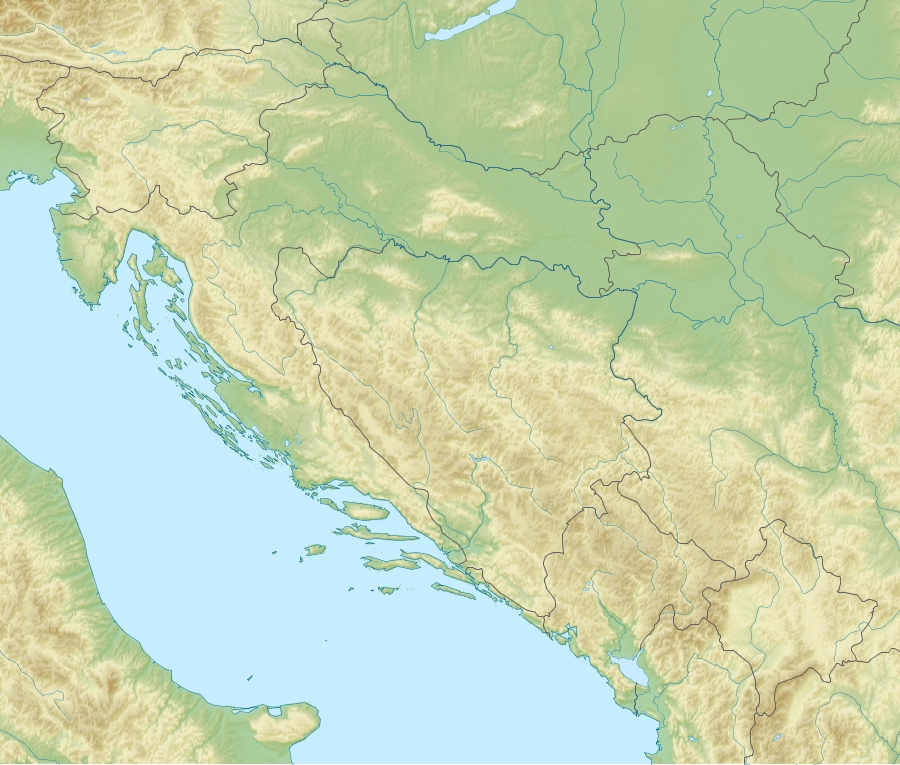
- Location within Slovenia Location within Dinaric Alps

Geography
- Coordinates: 45.875°N 13.9°E
- Interactive map of Vipava Valley

The Vipava Valley (pronounced [ʋiˈpaːʋa]; Slovene: Vipavska dolina, German: Wippachtal, Italian: Valle del Vipacco) is a valley in the Slovenian Littoral, roughly between the village of Podnanos to the east and the border with Italy to the west. The main towns are Ajdovščina and Vipava.

== Geography ==
The narrow valley of the Vipava River serves as the main passage between the Friulian lowland and central Slovenia, and is thus also an important corridor connecting Northern Italy to Central Europe. It is closed to the north by the high Trnovo Forest Plateau (Slovene: Trnovski gozd), and to the south by the Karst Plateau and the narrow Branica Valley, a geographical sub-unit of the Vipava Valley. It is named after the Vipava River. Its main urban center is Ajdovščina. Administratively, it is subdivided into the municipalities of Ajdovščina, Vipava, Nova Gorica, Renče-Vogrsko, and Miren-Kostanjevica. The municipality of Savogna d'Isonzo in the Province of Gorizia (Italy) is also located in the valley.

The Vipava Valley comprises five microregions:

1. The Lower Vipava Valley with the Gorizia Plain (Slovene: Spodnja Vipavska dolina z Goriško ravnino)
2. The Central Vipava Valley (Srednja Vipavska dolina)
3. The Upper Vipava Valley (Zgornja Vipavska dolina)
4. The Vipava Hills (Vipavska brda)
5. The Branica Valley (Braniška dolina)
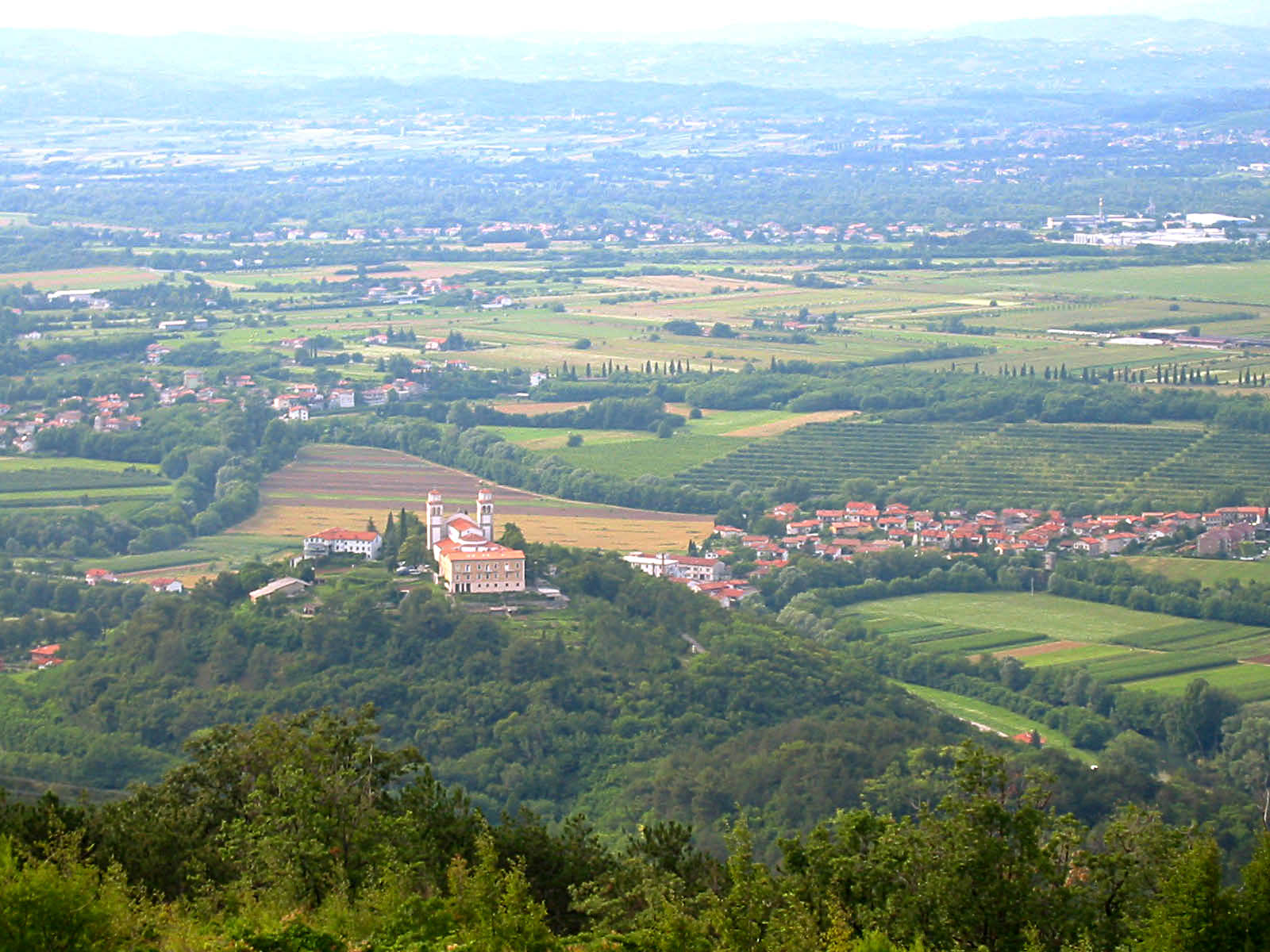
1. The Lower Vipava Valley with the Gorizia Plain

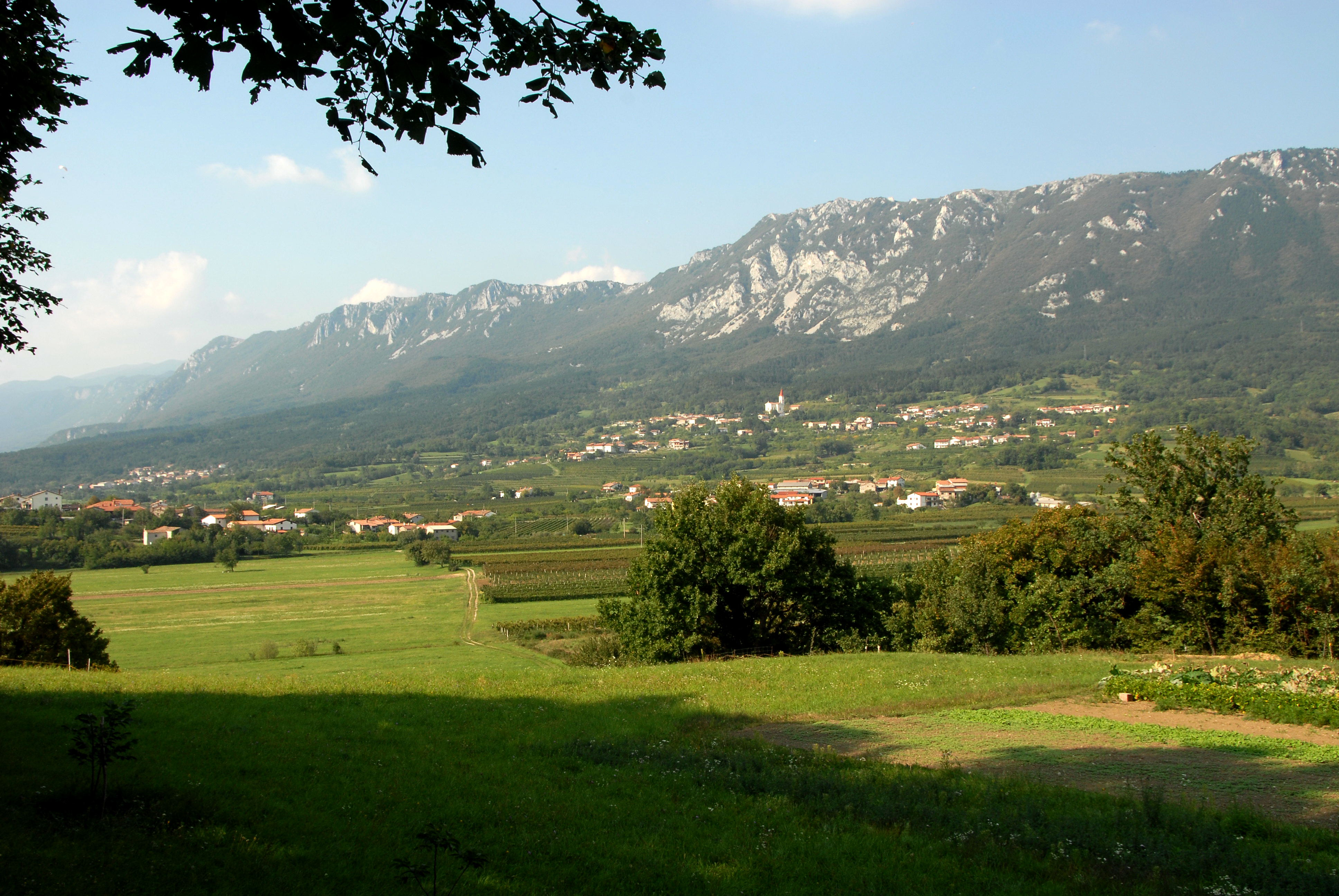
2. The Central Vipava Valley near Ajdovščina

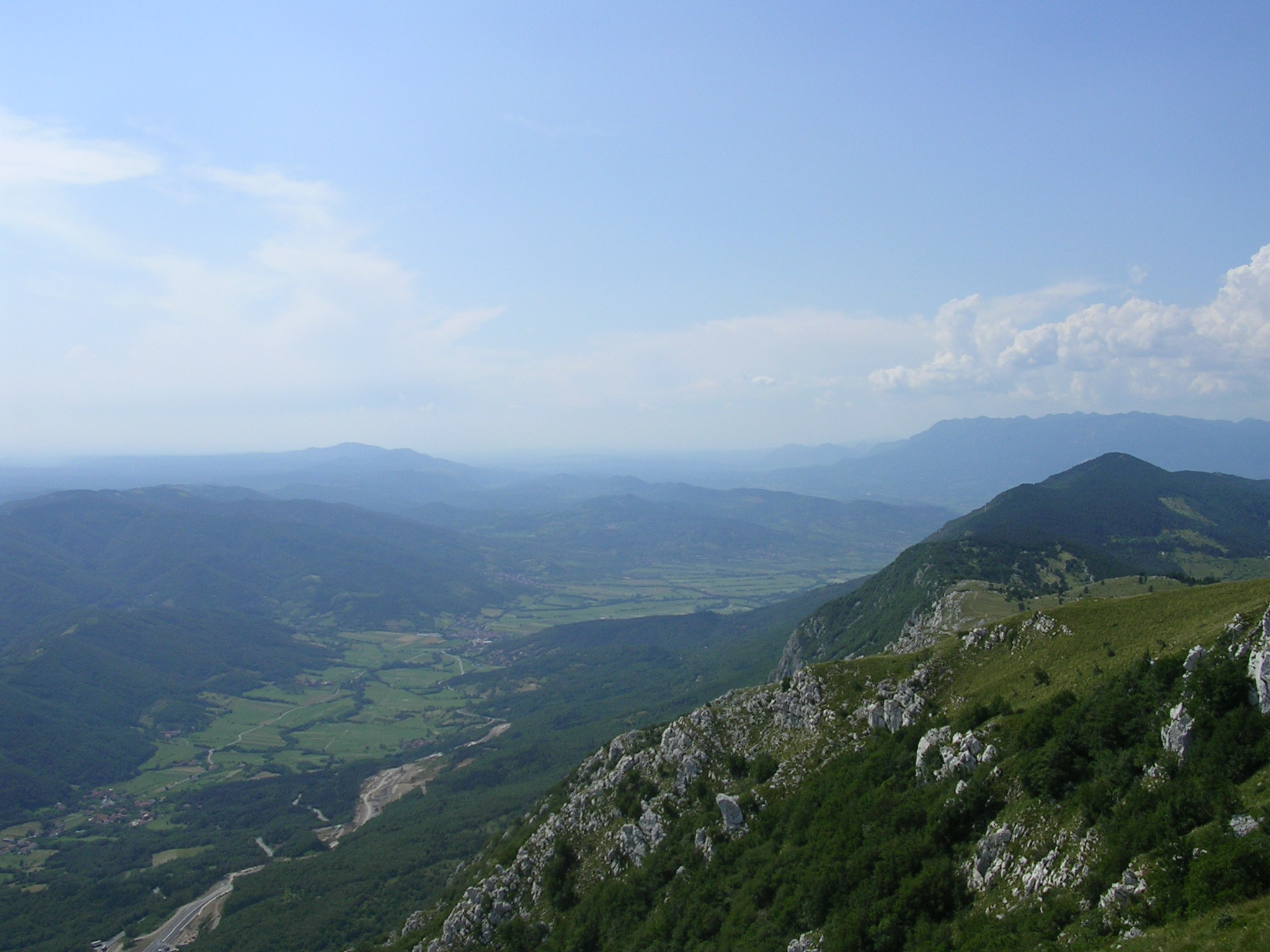
3. The Upper Vipava Valley seen from the Nanos Plateau

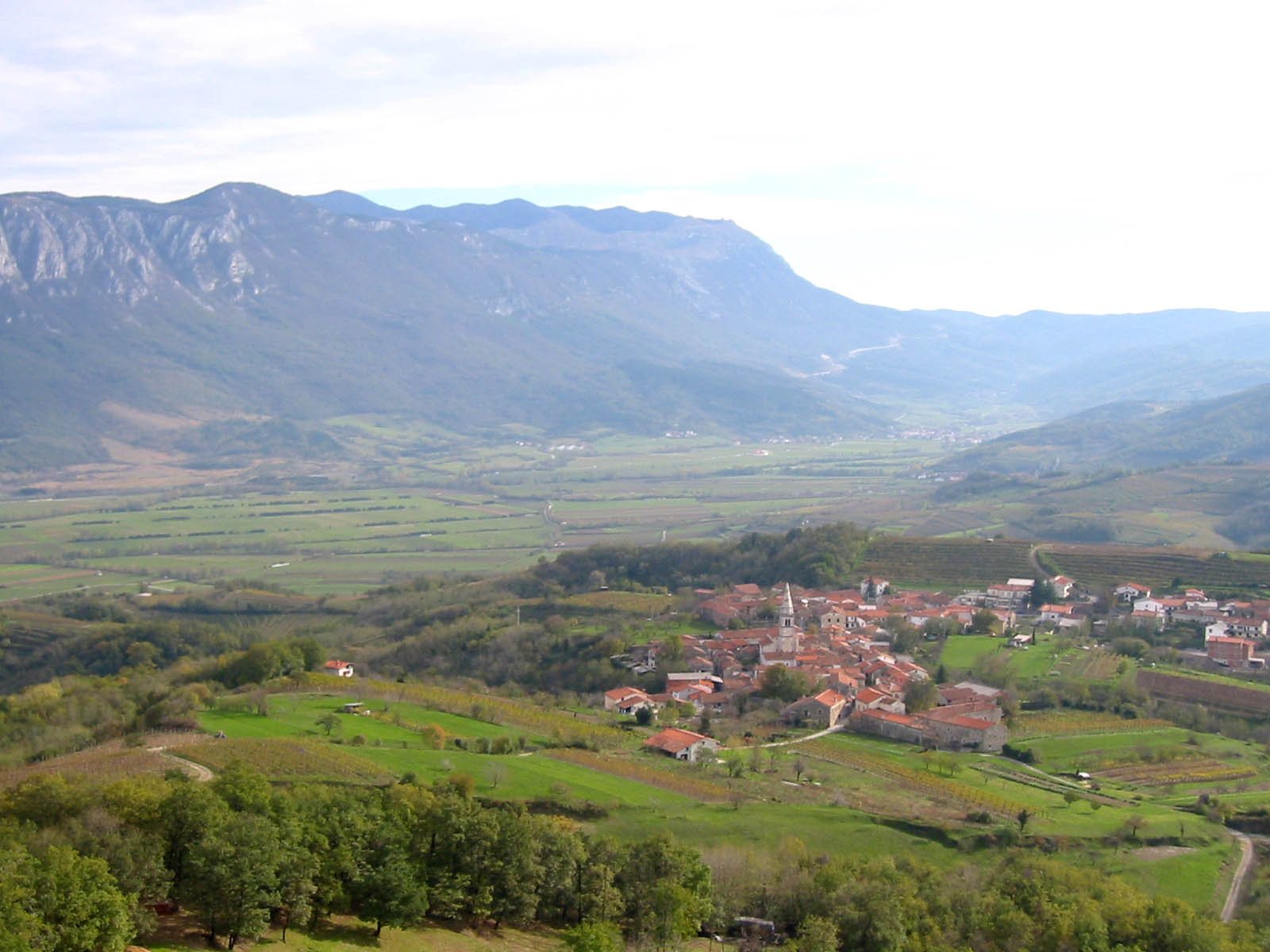
4. The Vipava Hills with the village of Goče

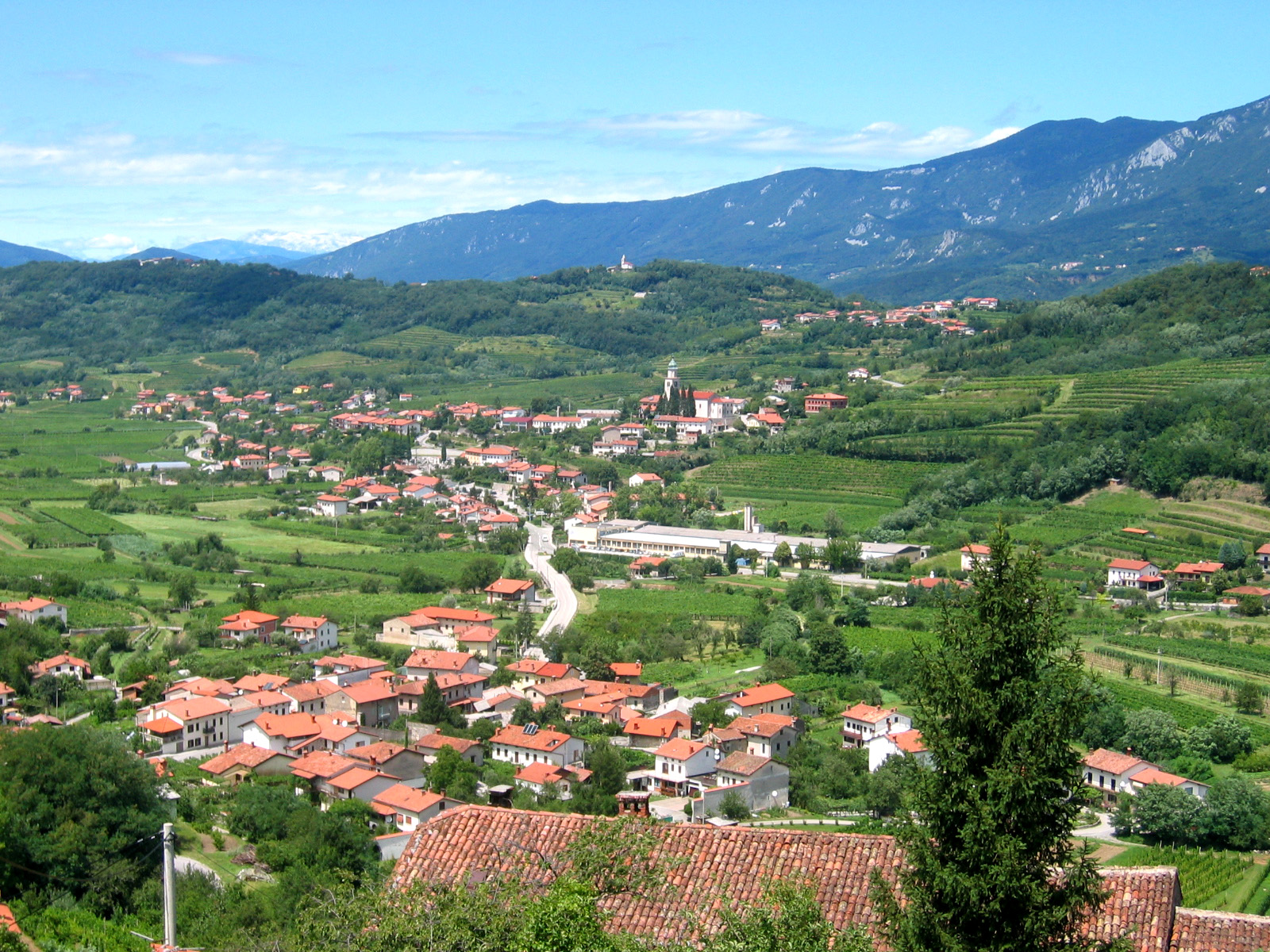
5. The Branica Valley with the village of Branik

=== Climate ===
The region has a relatively mild, sub-Mediterranean climate. It is constantly influenced by the warm and humid southwestern wind and by the cold and gusty northeastern bora (burja) wind, especially in the cold half of the year. Its gusts can reach speeds over 200 kilometers per hour (120 mph), hinder traffic, and damage trees and buildings. In some areas, trees grow aslant with asymmetric crowns.

== Economy ==
Due to its mild climate, the region is suitable for the cultivation of different kinds of fruits (especially peaches, apricots, persimmons, and figs). The Vipava Valley is also renowned for its quality wines, especially white ones. Among white grapes, the most common varieties in the region are Chardonnay, Sauvignon, and the indigenous varieties Zelen, Pinela, and Vitovska Garganja, while red varieties include Merlot, Barbera, and Cabernet Sauvignon.

== History ==
About 8000 BC the Vipava Valley was colonized by Illyrians, Iberians, and Ligures as well as later immigrated Celts and Etruscans (which thereafter became the Rhaetian people).

In Roman times the valley of the fluvius frigidus (literally, 'cold river', today the Vipava) became part of the Roman X Regio Augustea – ‘Venetia et Histria'. The inhabitants had Latin Rights until 90 BC, when Lucius Julius Caesar's Lex Julia de Civitate granted them full Roman citizenship. In 14 AD, legio XIII Gemina built the Via Gemina, which followed the Vipava Valley between the mouth of the river Vipava into the Soča at Pons Sonti (Gradisca d'Isonzo) and the later town Vipava. At the confluence with the Hubelj River, the 3rd-century Castra ad Fluvium Frigidum was built as integral part of the Claustra Alpium Iuliarum, a defensive system of walls and towers stretching from the Gail Valley (now Carinthia, Austria) to the Učka mountain range (now Croatia). The Battle of Frigidus, in which the Eastern Emperor Theodosius I overthrew his Western rival Eugenius, took place in this region in 394.

In medieval times, the upper eastern part of the valley, including the town of Vipava and half of the town of Ajdovščina, belonged to the Duchy of Carniola (specifically, to Inner Carniola), while the lower western part was incorporated in the County of Gorizia and Gradisca and thus to the Austrian Littoral. Today, the inhabitants mostly feel part of the Goriška region of the Slovenian Littoral, and the Carniolan identity has almost completely disappeared.

After World War I and the breakup of the Austro-Hungarian Empire, the entire valley was occupied by the Italian Army, annexed to the Kingdom of Italy, and incorporated into the newly established Province of Gorizia. During the Fascist period (1922–1943), the people of the valley were subjected to a policy of violent Fascist Italianization, which triggered local resistance, both peaceful and violent (with the insurgent group TIGR). After 1941, the upper part of the valley became one of the first centers of Partisan resistance in Italy. Nazi Germany occupied the valley in September 1943, and the fighting between the Slovene Communist-led resistance and the Nazis continued until the end of the Second World War. In May 1945, Partisan forces liberated the area. In June 1945, the Morgan Line was established, dividing the Yugoslav occupation zone to the east and the Allied one to the west: the border ran through the middle of the valley, around the village of Branik. In September 1947, the entire valley was transferred to Yugoslavia, with the sole exception of the village of Savogna d'Isonzo (Slovene: Sovodnje), which remained in Italy. During Slovenia's Ten-Day War for independence, the valley was the theater of fighting between the Yugoslav People's Army and the Slovenian military, which involved local inhabitants who spontaneously aided the Slovenian forces by putting up improvised roadblocks preventing the advance of Yugoslav federal troops.

Prominent people who were born or lived in the region include the painters Zoran Mušič and Veno Pilon, the poets Stanko Vuk, Simon Gregorčič, Nevin Birsa, and Josip Murn, the diplomat and writer Sigismund von Herberstein, the historian Martin Baučer, the preachers Sebastijan Krelj and Tobia Lionelli, the composer of the music for the Slovenian national anthem Stanko Premrl, the Partisan hero Janko Premrl, the author Danilo Lokar, the literary historian Avgust Žigon, and the designer Oskar Kogoj.

== See also ==
- Goriška
- Austrian Riviera
- Julian March
- Battle of the Frigidus
