= Vipava, Vipava =

Vipava
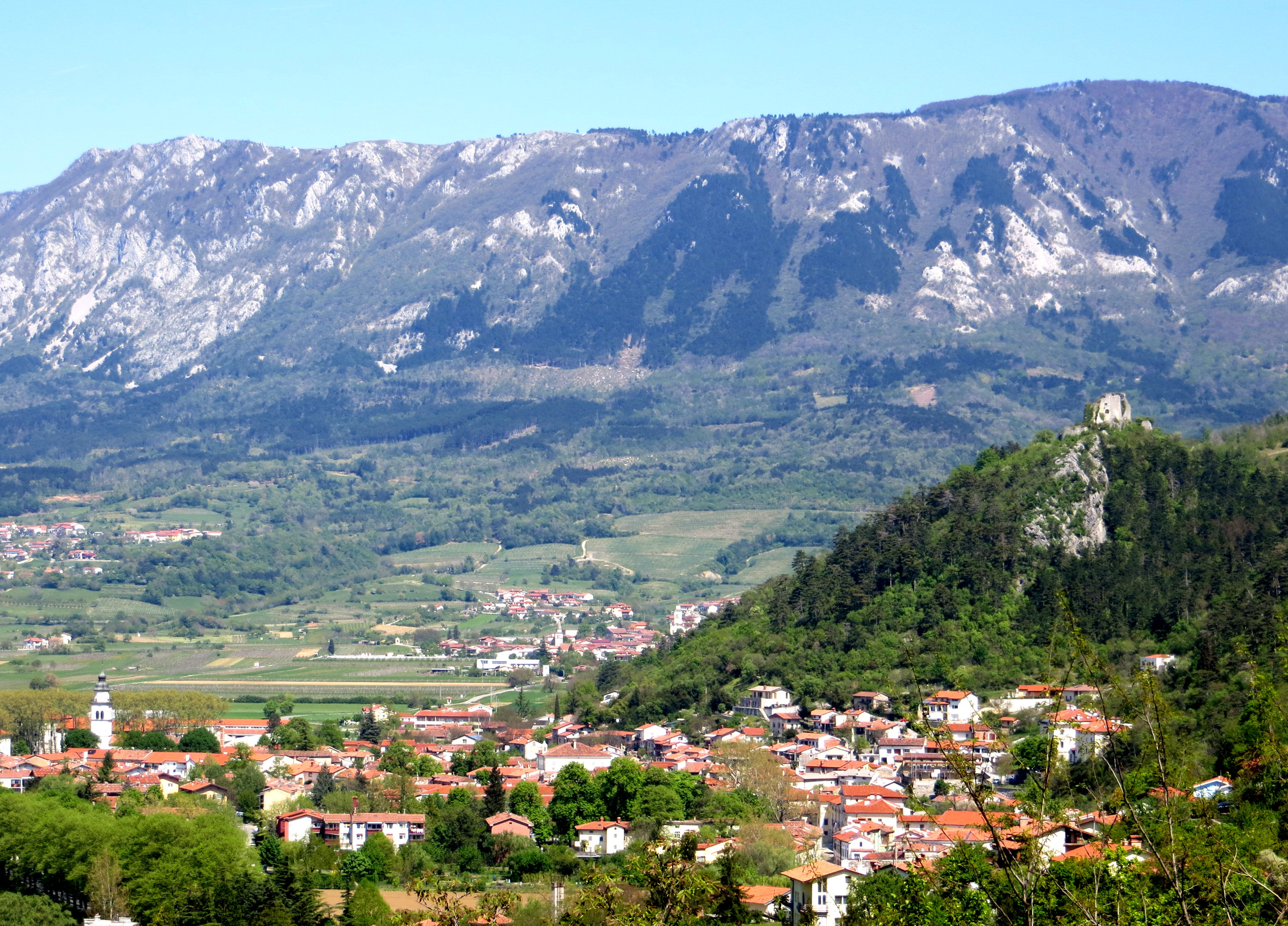

- Location in Slovenia
- Coordinates: 45°50′51.21″N 13°57′44.48″E
- Country: Slovenia
- Traditional region: Inner Carniola
- Statistical region: Gorizia
- Municipality: Vipava

Area
  - Total: 6.6 km^{2} (2.5 sq mi)
- Elevation: 108.5 m (356 ft)

Population (2012)
  - Total: 1,953

Vipava (pronounced [ʋiˈpaːʋa]; Italian: Vipacco, German: Wippach) is a town in western Slovenia. It is the largest settlement and the seat of the Municipality of Vipava. Vipava is located near the numerous sources of the Vipava River, in the upper Vipava Valley, 102 metres (335 ft) above sea level. Historically, it is part of the traditional region of Inner Carniola, but it is now generally regarded as part of the Slovenian Littoral.

== History ==
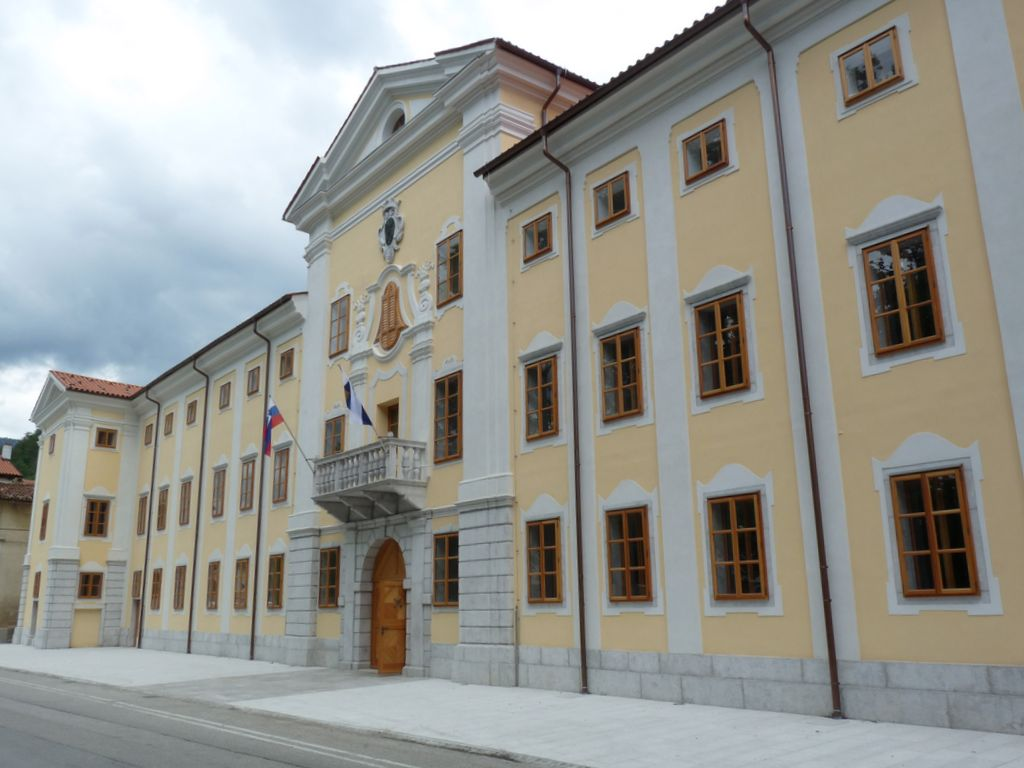
The Lanthieri Mansion in the center of Vipava

The region around the town was probably settled by the Illyrians and Celts in the pre-Roman era. Some trace the name Vipava to the Celtic root vip (river). In 394, the Battle of the Frigidus took place in the vicinity of the town. In the late 6th century, Slavic tribes, ancestors of modern Slovenes, settled the area. In the late 8th century, the Vipava Valley was included in the Frankish Empire and the Christianization of Slovenes started.

In the Middle Ages, the valley was first included in the Duchy of Friuli. Between 1340 and 1355, Vipava and its surroundings were constantly contended between the Counts of Gorizia, the Patriarches of Aquileia and the Habsburg Duchy of Carniola. Modern Vipava was first mentioned in 1367. In the same period, it was finally included in the County of Gorizia. After a short Venetian interim, Vipava fell under the Habsburg domain in 1501 and in 1535 it was included in Carniola. In the mid-16th century, it emerged as an important center of the Protestant Reformation. It remained part of Carniola until 1918, when it was occupied by the Italian troops and annexed to the Kingdom of Italy.

In the period between 1922 and 1943, it was subjected to a violent policy of Fascist Italianization. Many locals joined the militant antifascist organization TIGR. During World War II, the entire area became an important center of Partisan resistance. In 1945, it was liberated by Partisan troops and in 1947 it became part of the Socialist Federal Republic of Yugoslavia, and of independent Slovenia in 1991.

=== Mass graves ===
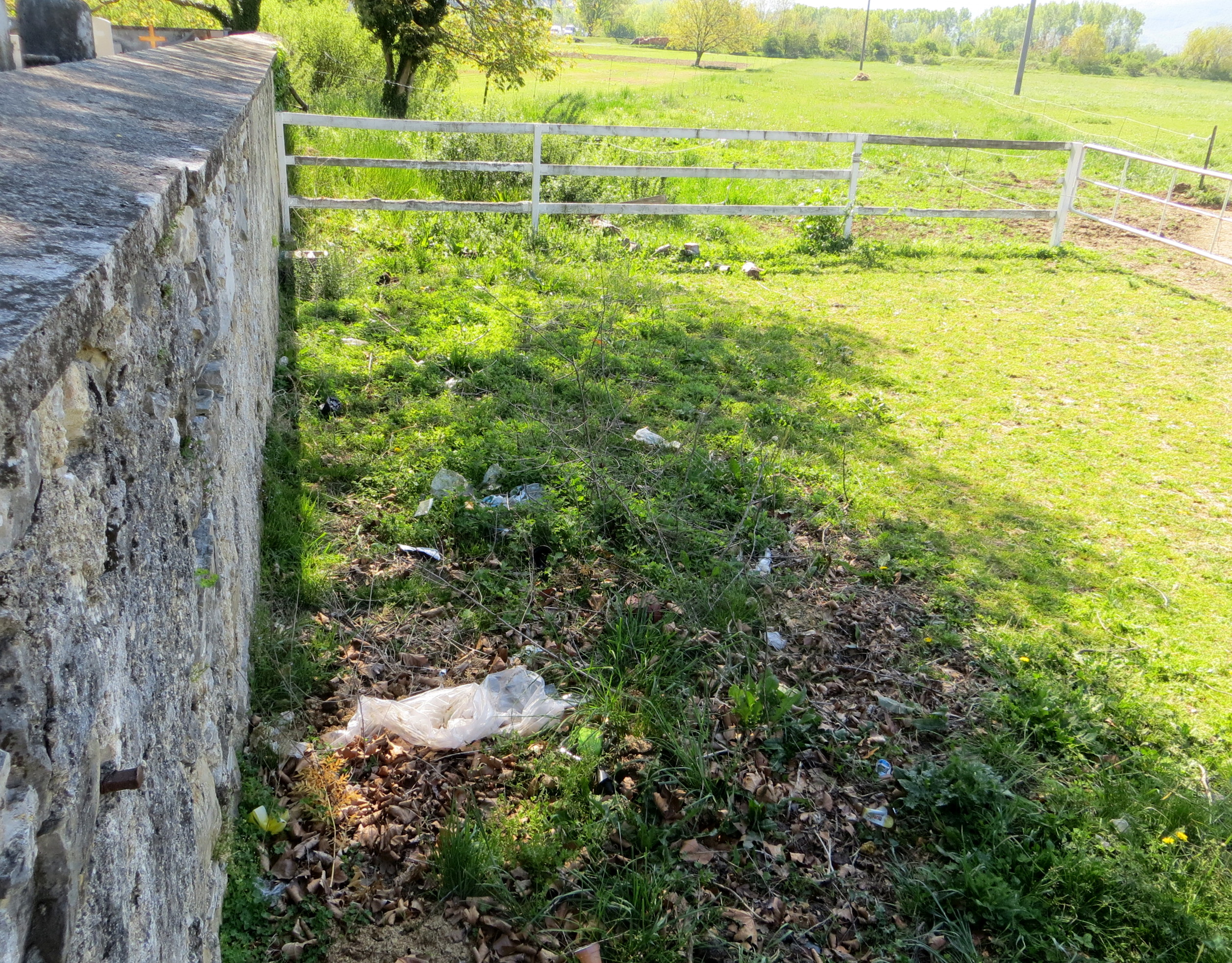
Cemetery Mass Grave

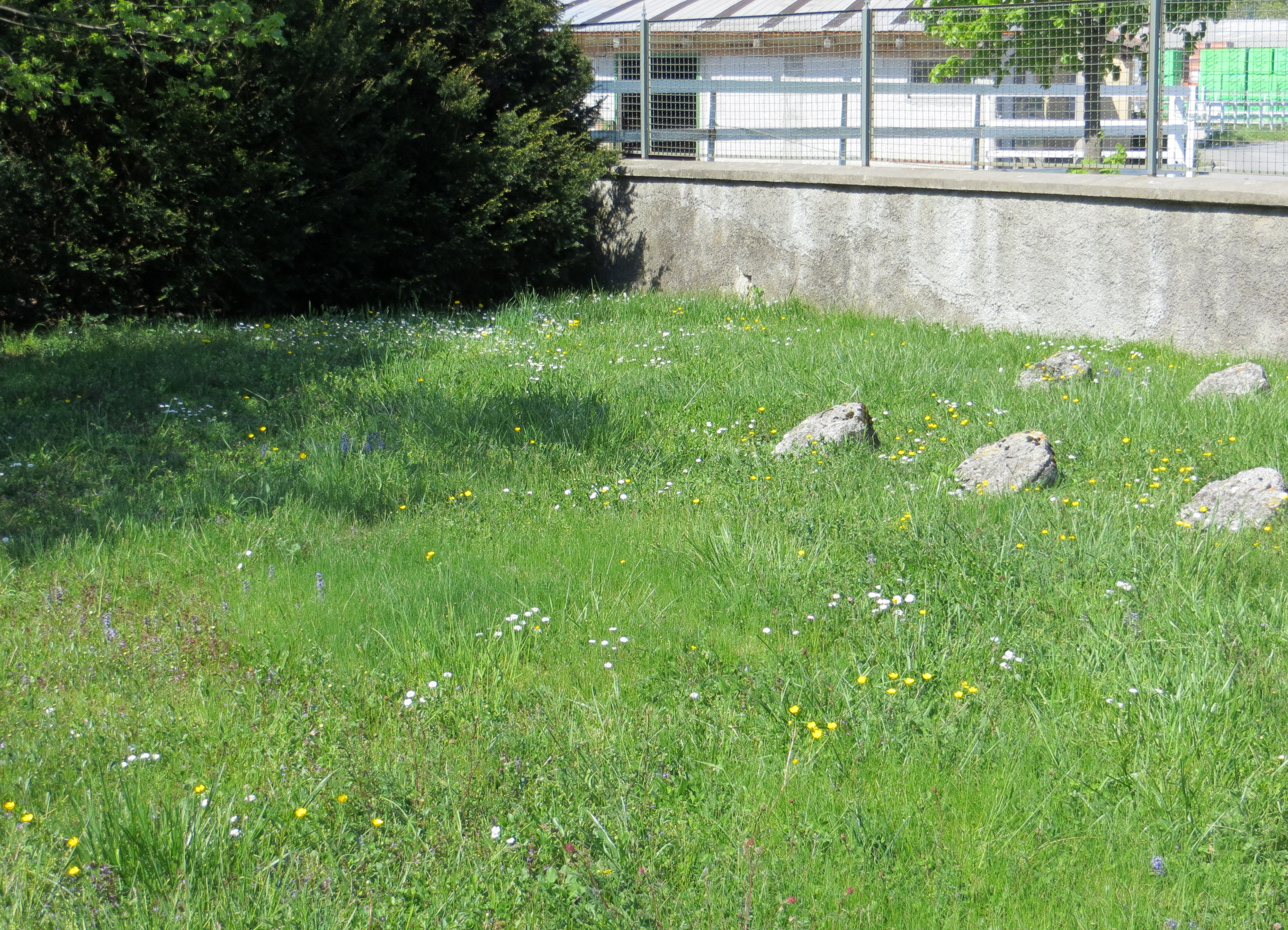
Military Cemetery Mass Grave

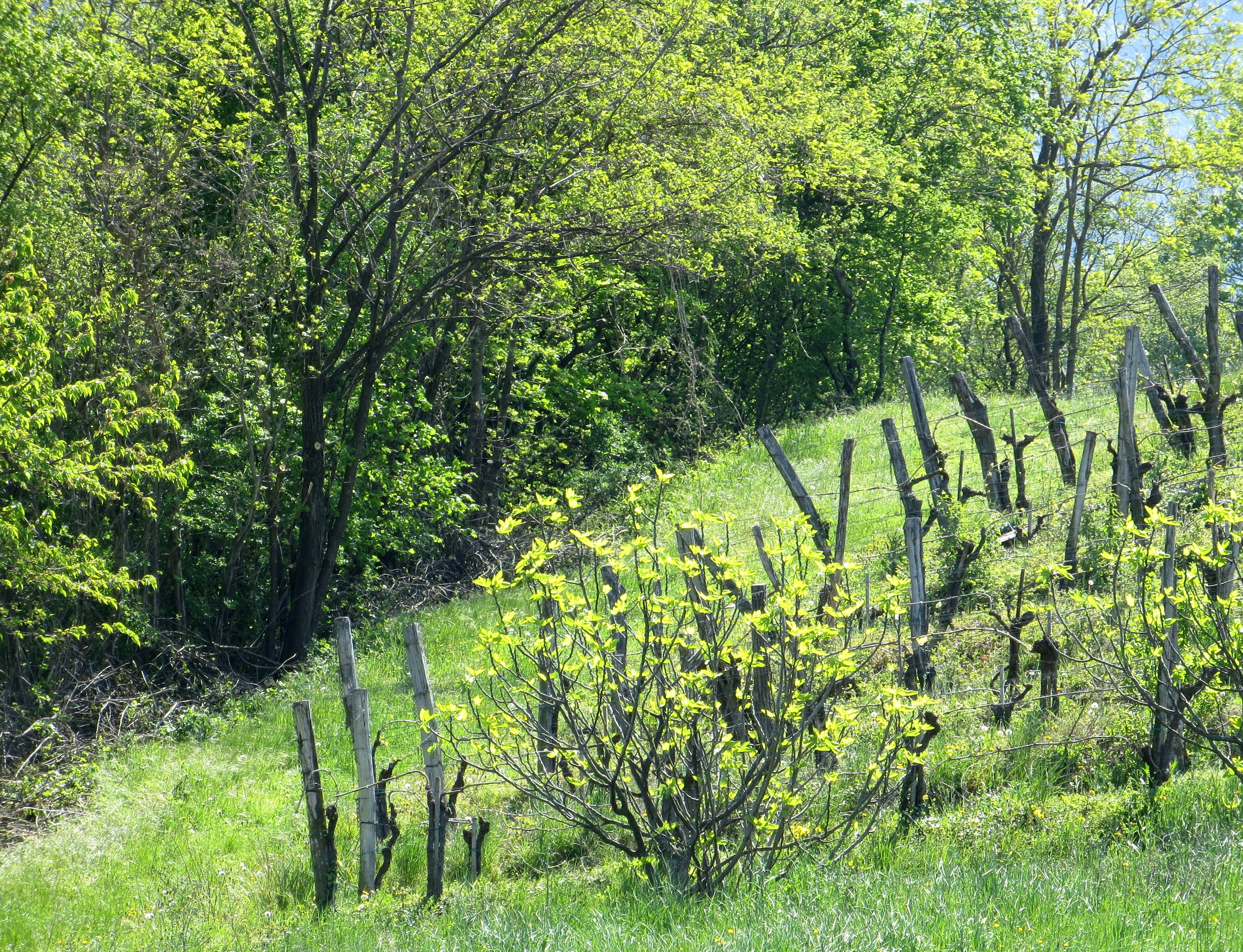
Princova Baronovka Mass Grave

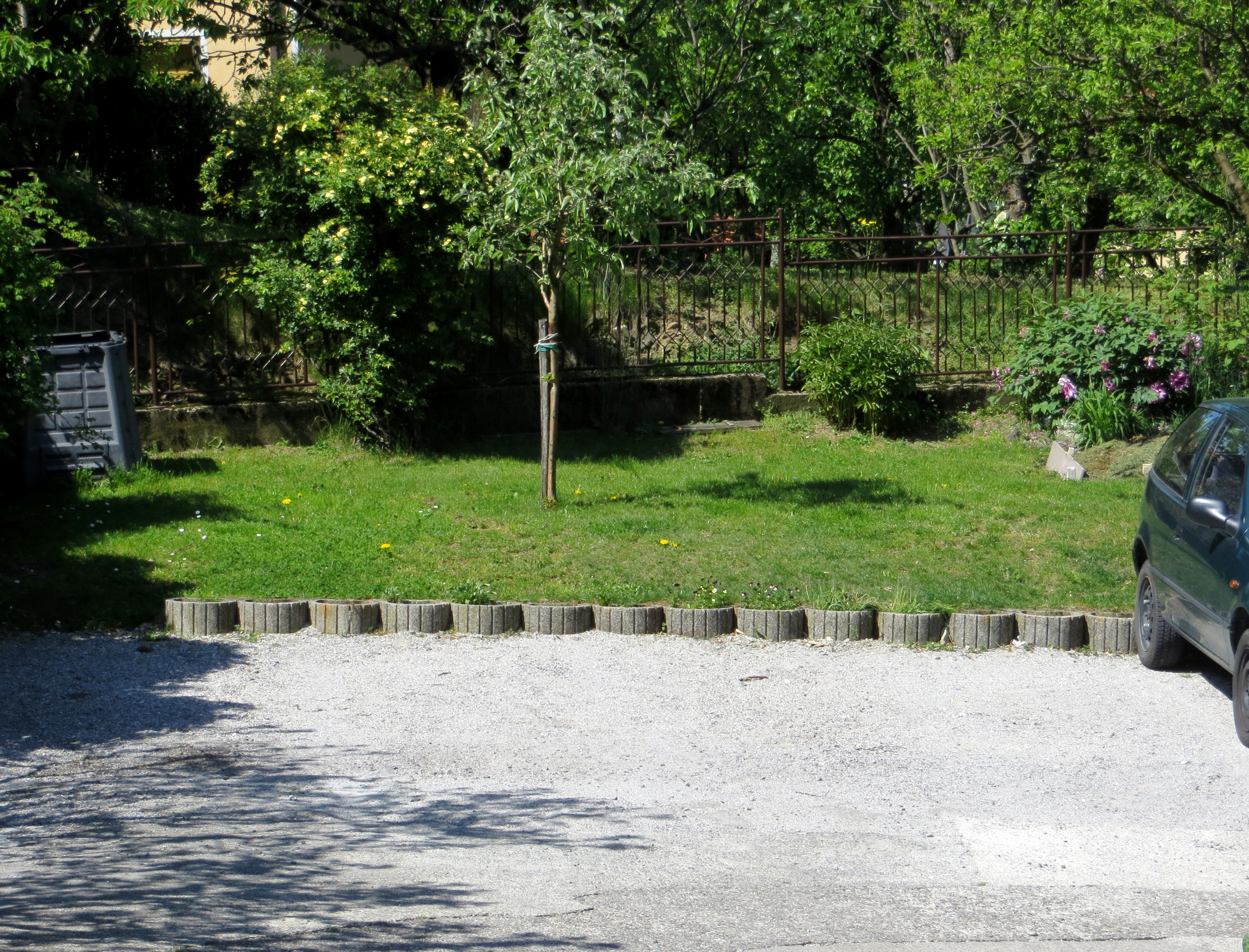
Bevk Street Mass Grave

Mass graves in Vipava

Vipava is the site of five known mass graves from the end of or after the Second World War. The Cemetery Mass Grave (Slovene: Grobišče pri pokopališču) is located next to the southwest wall of the Vipava Cemetery. It contained the remains of eight Slovene civilians murdered by the Yugoslav Army on July 14, 1945. The identities of six victims are known. The remains of six were exhumed in 1999 and reinterred in the cemetery. The Military Cemetery Mass Grave (Grobišče na vojaškem pokopališču) is located by the west edge of the First World War military cemetery. It contains the remains of 15 Chetnik soldiers killed in late April or early May 1945. Three additional graves contain the remains of German prisoners of war that died of typhus at the nearby prison camp in 1945. The Vipava Field Mass Grave (Grobišče Vipavsko polje) extends south of the dairy to Močilnik Creek. It is partially covered by the freeway and contains a large number of remains. The Princova Baronovka Mass Grave (Grobišče Princova baronovka) lies in the southern part of the town. The Bevk Street Mass Grave (Grobišče na Bevkovi ulici) is located at Bevk Streek (Bevkova ulica) no. 16. Human remains were unearthed during excavations for the building there.

== Economy ==
Vipava is an important agricultural center of western Slovenia. It is renowned for its wine production. Tourism is also important, as well as small and medium-sized businesses. Many locals work in the nearby town of Ajdovščina.

== Language, culture, and religion ==
The vast majority of the people of Vipava, around 93%, are Slovenes. Others are mostly descendants of immigrants from other regions of the former Yugoslavia. Over 96% of the people use Slovene as their first language; among the remaining 4%, most speak Bosnian as their first language. The native inhabitants speak a variant of the Inner Carniolan dialect of Slovene.

Around 77% of the people are Catholic, a little less than 1% are adherents of Sunni Islam, and others are irreligious. The parish church in the town is dedicated to Saint Stephen and belongs to the Diocese of Koper.

== Notable people ==
Notable people that were born or lived in Vipava include:

- Drago Bajc (1904–1928), poet
- Andreas Baumkirchner (1420–1471), nobleman, leader of an unsuccessful conspiracy against Frederick III, Holy Roman Emperor
- Sigismund von Herberstein (1486–1566), diplomat and author
- Štefan Kociančič (1813–1883), theologian and translator
- Sebastian Krelj (1538–1567), Slovene Protestant writer and preacher
- Anton Lavrin (1789–1869), Austrian diplomat and Egyptologist

== Gallery ==
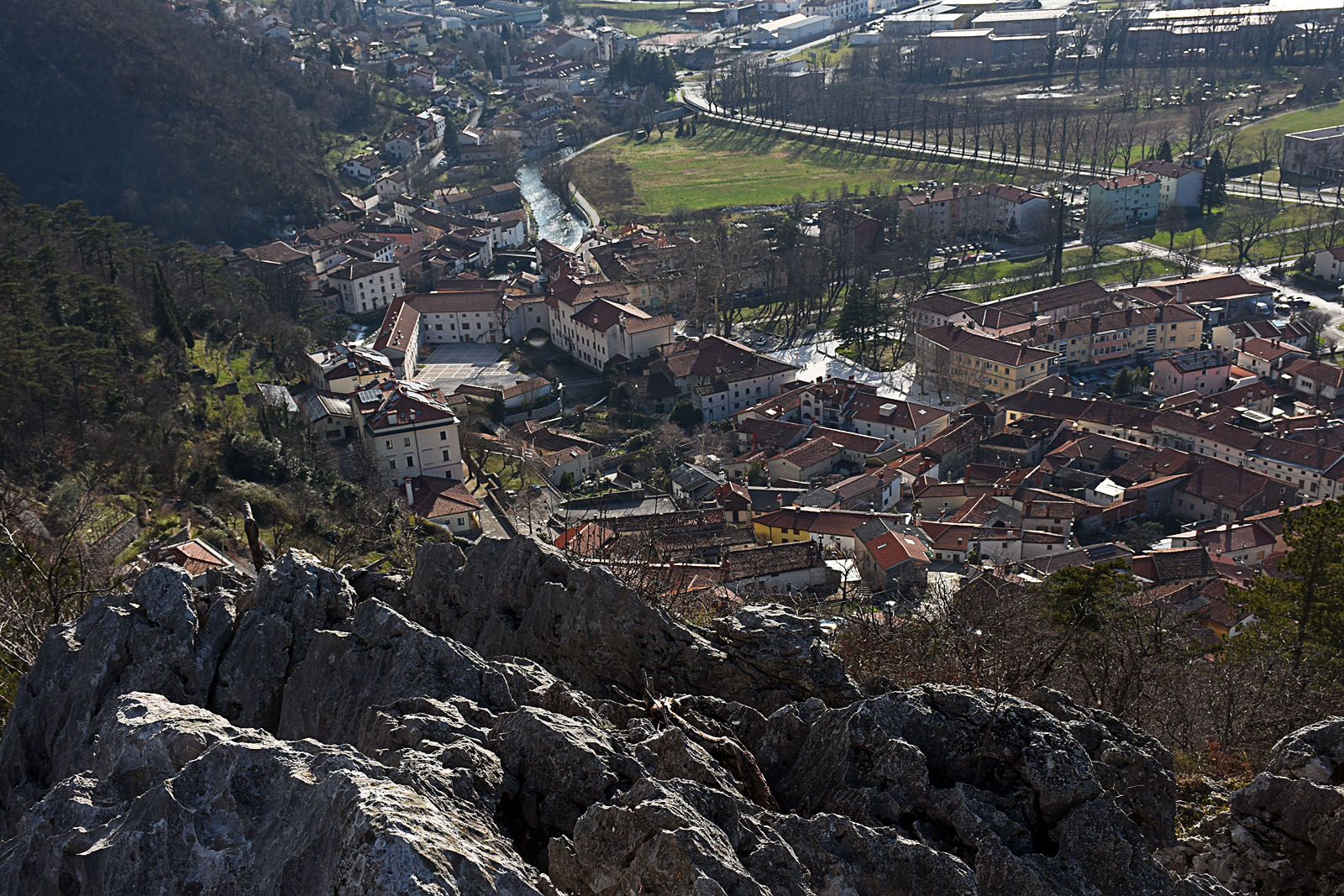
Vipava from above, from the Old Castle

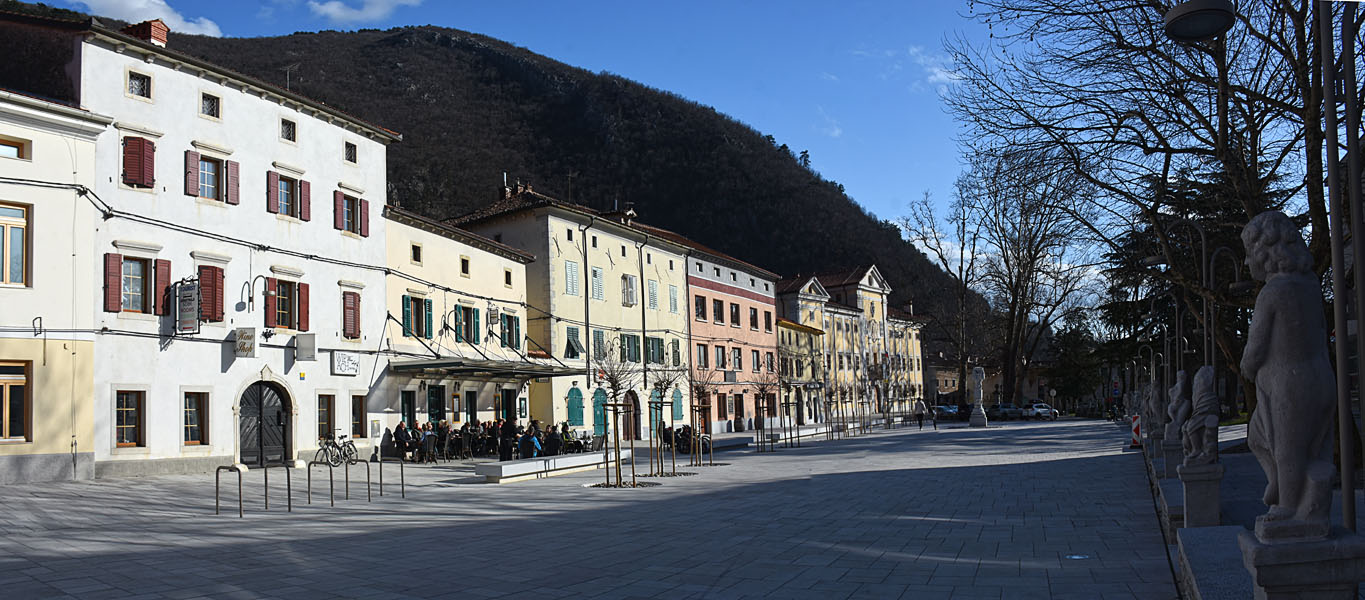
Vipava's main square

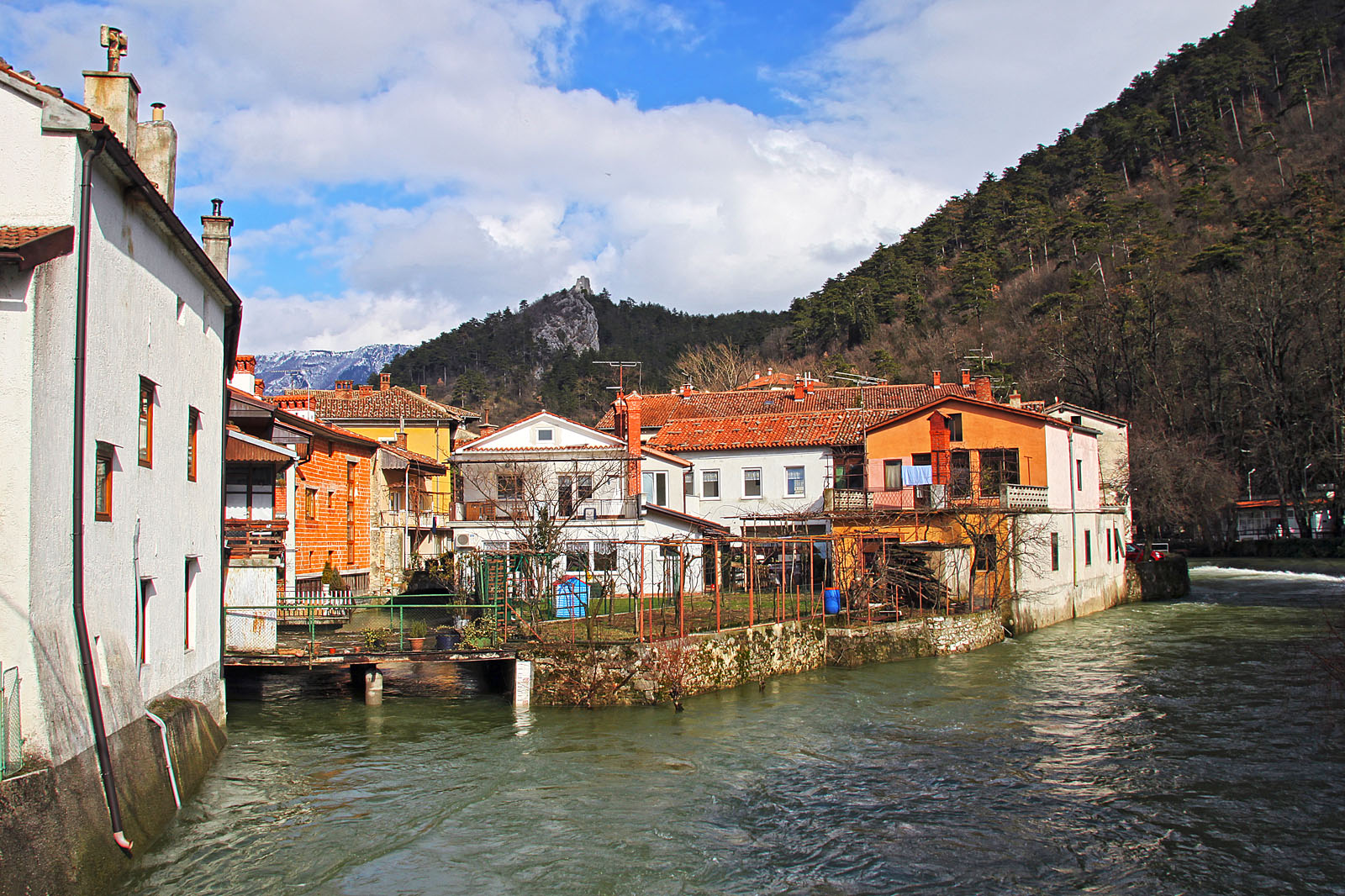
Old part of Vipava

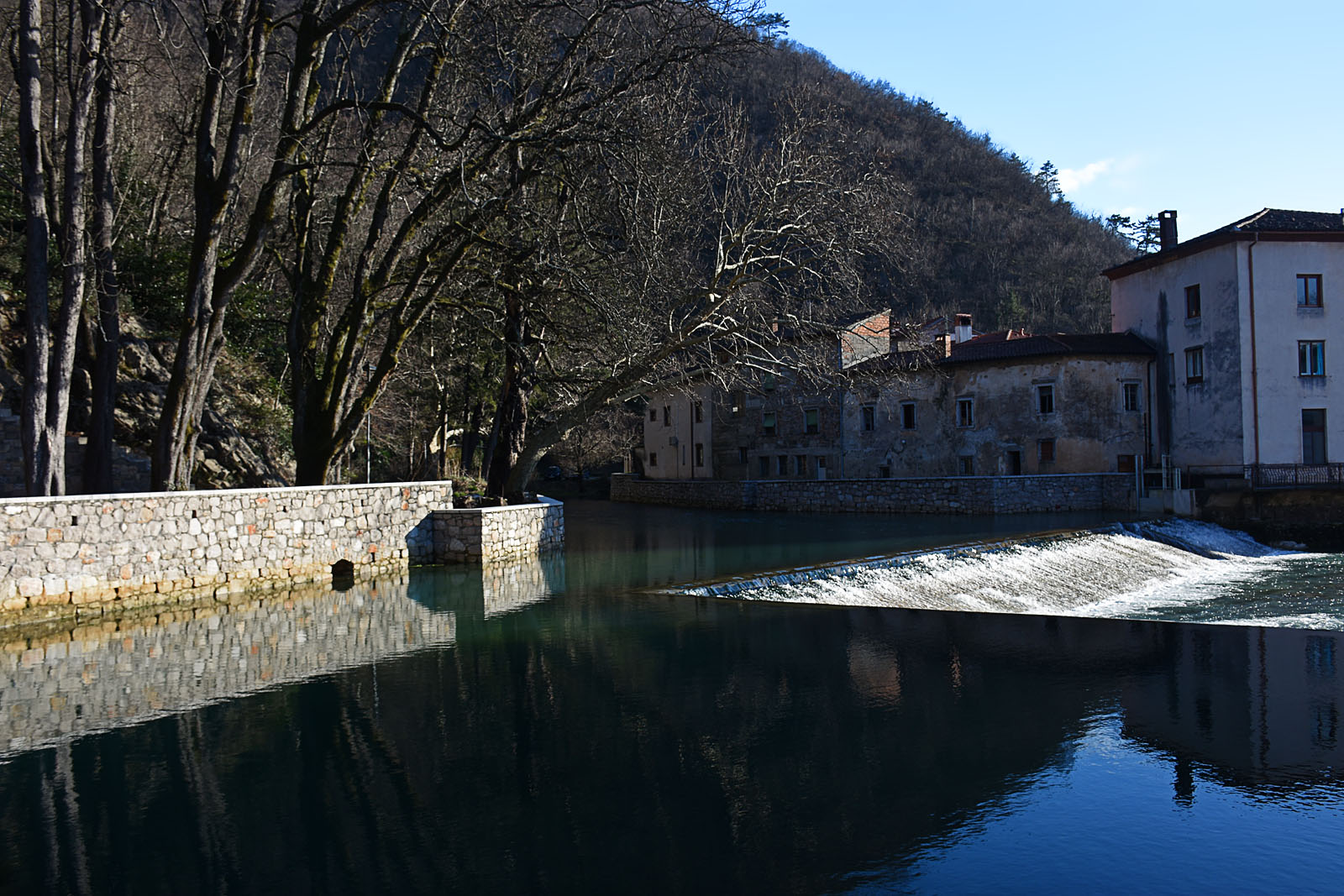
One of the sources of the Vipava River

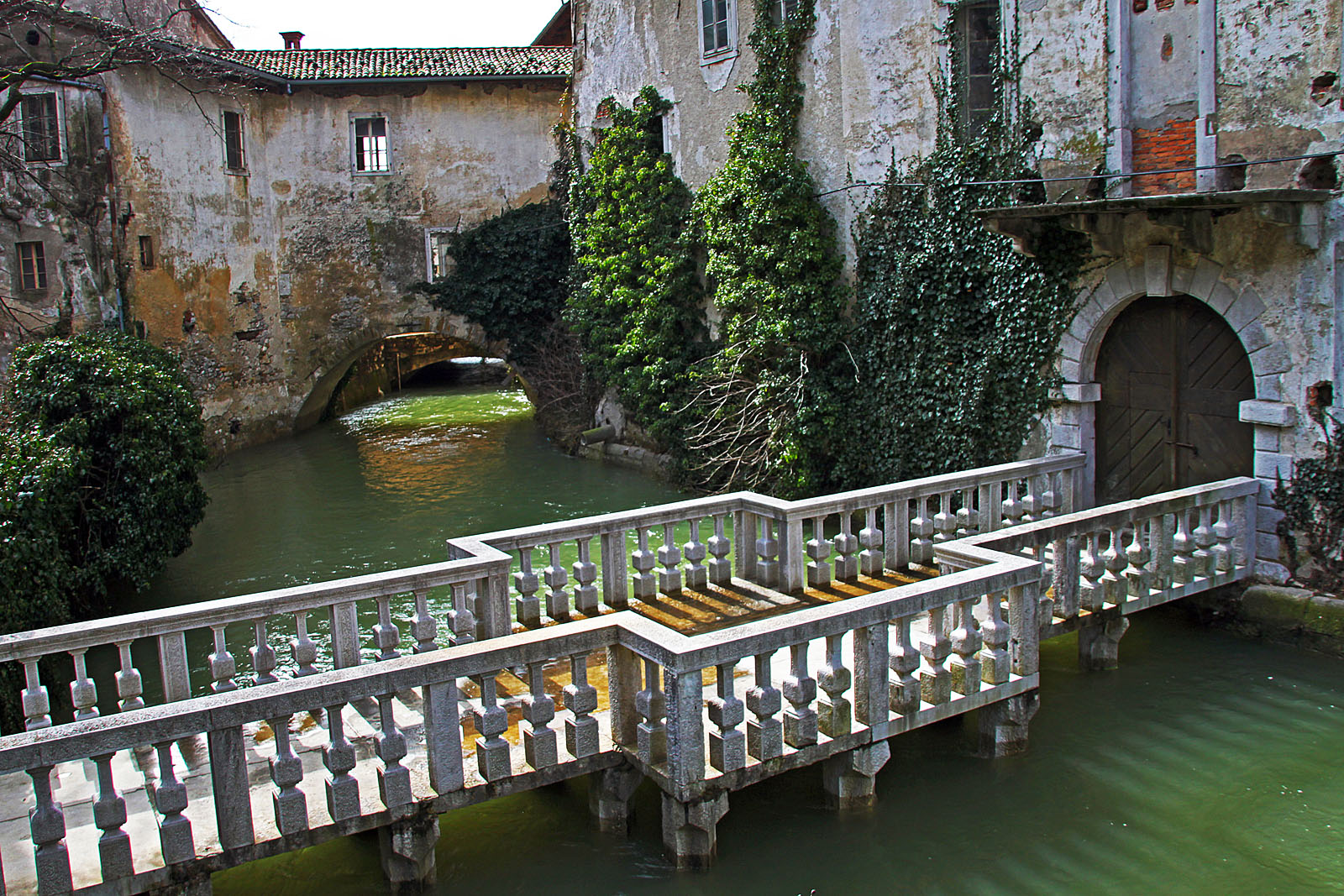
Back side of the Lanthieri Mansion
