= Žagolič =

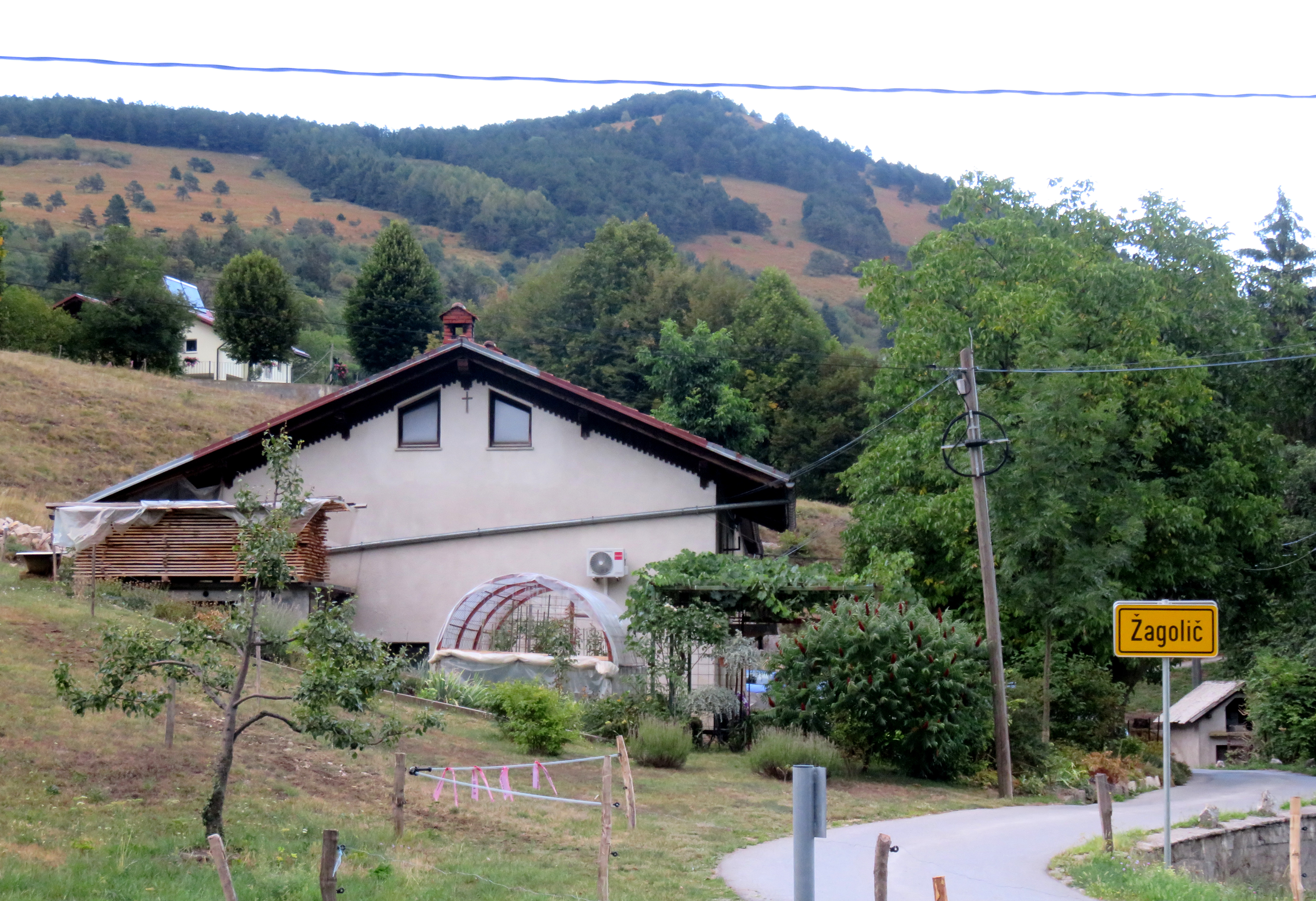

- Location in Slovenia
- Coordinates: 45°53′33.3″N 13°59′48.57″E
- Country: Slovenia
- Traditional region: Littoral
- Statistical region: Gorizia
- Municipality: Ajdovščina

Area
  - Total: 2.85 km^{2} (1.10 sq mi)
- Elevation: 763.3 m (2,504 ft)

Population (2020)
  - Total: 159
  - Density: 55.8/km^{2} (144/sq mi)

Žagolič (pronounced [ˈʒaːɡɔlitʃ], in older sources Zagolice, Zagoliče, and Zagolič) is a small village northwest of Col in the Municipality of Ajdovščina in the Littoral region of Slovenia.

== History ==
Oral tradition states that Žagolič is named after sawmills (Slovene: žage) that stood along a creek above the settlement. According to the tradition, shepherds herded their sheep across the estate belonging to the Counts of Abensberg based in Col. Because of the damage caused by the livestock, the counts had the spring feeding the creek blocked; the water then took an underground route and the sawmills were removed. Žagolič was a hamlet of Malo Polje until 1989, when it became an independent settlement.
