= Vrtovin =

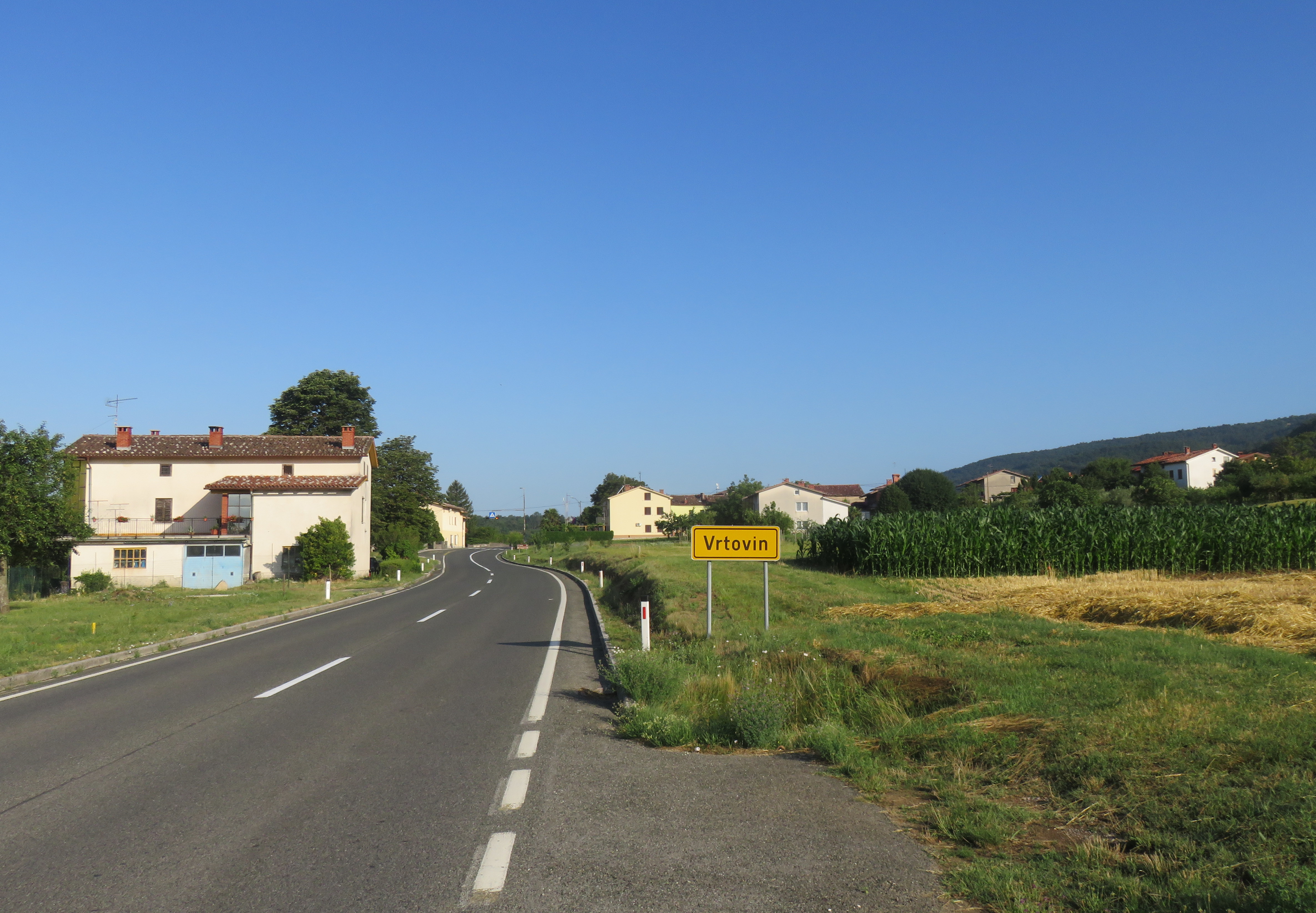

- Location in Slovenia
- Coordinates: 45°53′59.68″N 13°48′46.04″E
- Country: Slovenia
- Traditional region: Littoral
- Statistical region: Gorizia
- Municipality: Ajdovščina

Area
  - Total: 16.14 km^{2} (6.23 sq mi)
- Elevation: 159.3 m (523 ft)

Population (2020)
  - Total: 452
  - Density: 28.0/km^{2} (72.5/sq mi)

Vrtovin (pronounced [ʋəɾtɔˈʋiːn] or [ʋəɾˈtɔːʋin]; Italian: Vertovino) is a village on the northern edge of the Vipava Valley in the Municipality of Ajdovščina in the Littoral region of Slovenia. It includes several smaller hamlets: Grželi, Čebuli, Fužina, Guli, and Stovška Vas (Slovene: Stovška vas) south of the main village and Krti, Šateji, Subani, Jama, Kocjani, Rebki, Čermeli, Guštini, Fevči, and Lozarji to the north.

The local church is dedicated to the Assumption of Mary and belongs to the Parish of Kamnje.
