= Tevče, Ajdovščina =

Tevče
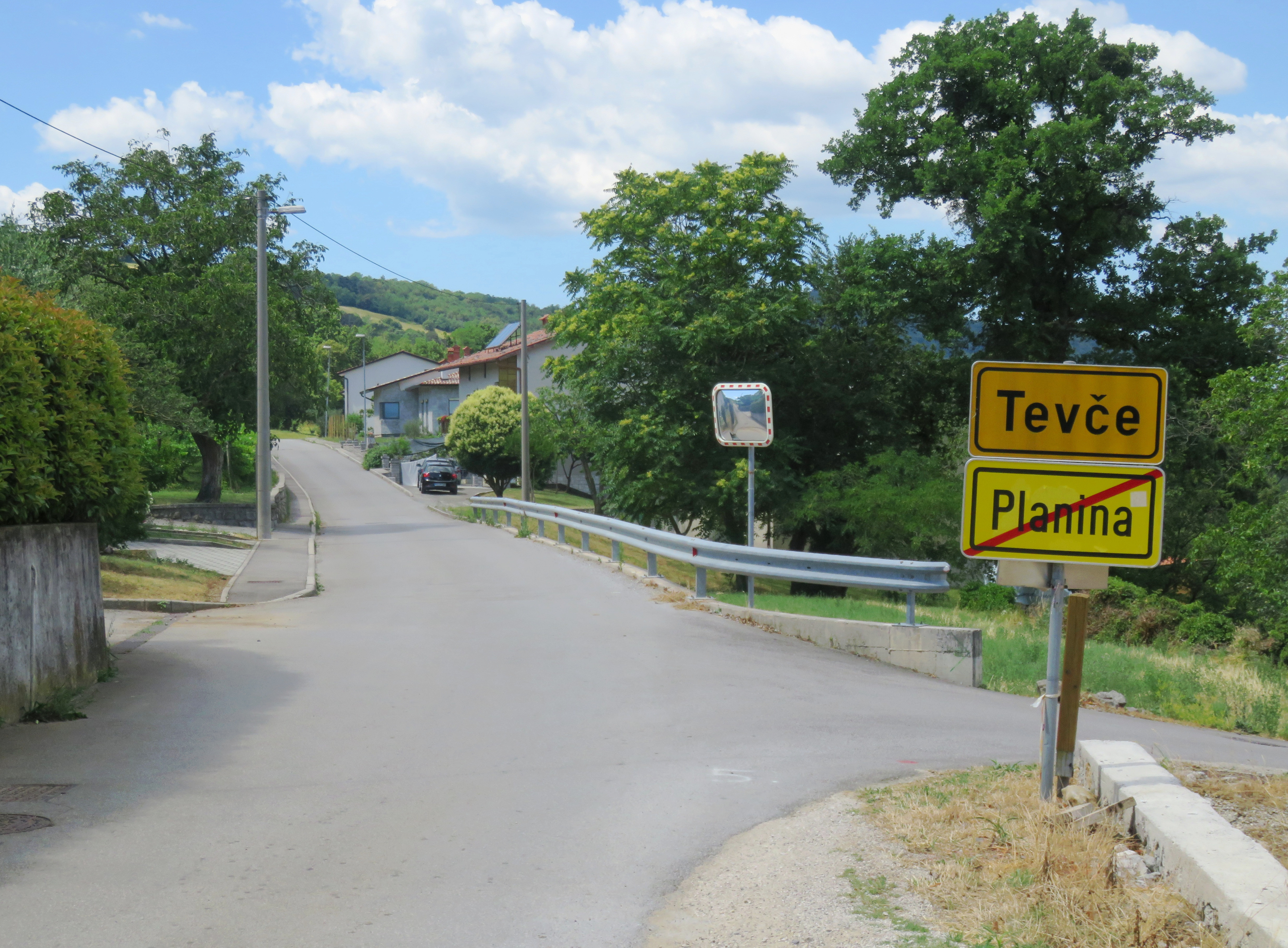

- Location in Slovenia
- Coordinates: 45°51′47.83″N 13°53′2.46″E
- Country: Slovenia
- Traditional region: Littoral
- Statistical region: Gorizia
- Municipality: Ajdovščina

Area
  - Total: 0.42 km^{2} (0.16 sq mi)
- Elevation: 173.2 m (568 ft)

Population (2020)
  - Total: 100
  - Density: 240/km^{2} (620/sq mi)

Tevče (pronounced [ˈteːu̯tʃɛ]) is a small settlement on the left bank of the Vipava River south of Ajdovščina in the Littoral region of Slovenia.
