= Velike Žablje =

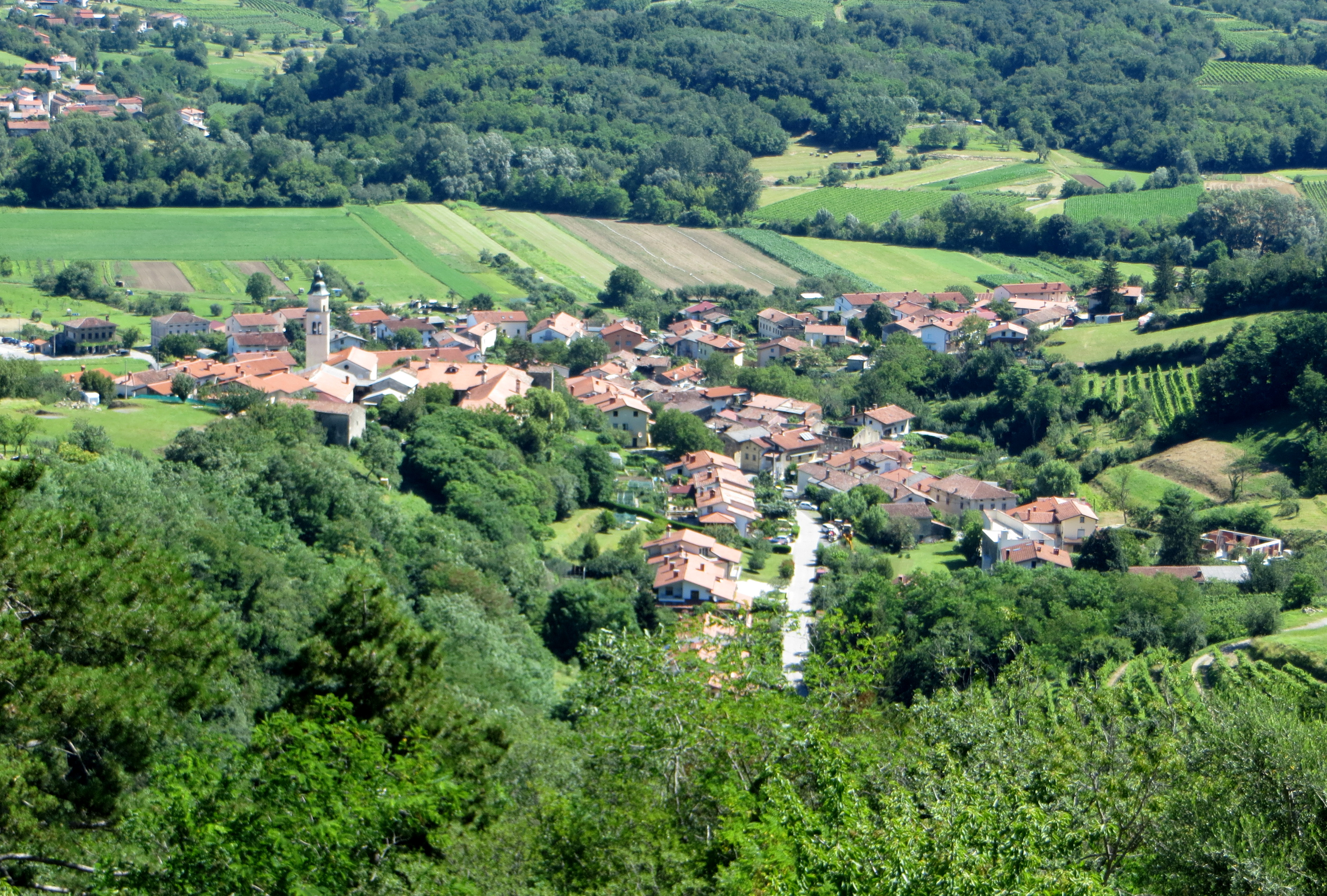

- Location in Slovenia
- Coordinates: 45°52′1.55″N 13°51′2.55″E
- Country: Slovenia
- Traditional region: Littoral
- Statistical region: Gorizia
- Municipality: Ajdovščina

Area
  - Total: 3.12 km^{2} (1.20 sq mi)
- Elevation: 85.7 m (281 ft)

Population (2020)
  - Total: 327
  - Density: 105/km^{2} (271/sq mi)

Velike Žablje (pronounced [ˈʋeːlikɛ ˈʒaːbljɛ]) is a village on the southern edge of the Vipava Valley in the Municipality of Ajdovščina in the Littoral region of Slovenia.

== Name ==
The name Velike Žablje literally means 'big Žablje', contrasting with neighboring Male Žablje (literally, 'little Žablje'). Like related toponyms (e.g., Žabnica, Žabče, and Žablje), the name is derived from the Slovene common noun žaba 'frog', referring to a settlement near a wetland where frogs live.

== Church ==
The parish church in the settlement is dedicated to Saint Florian and belongs to the Koper Diocese.
