= Malovše =

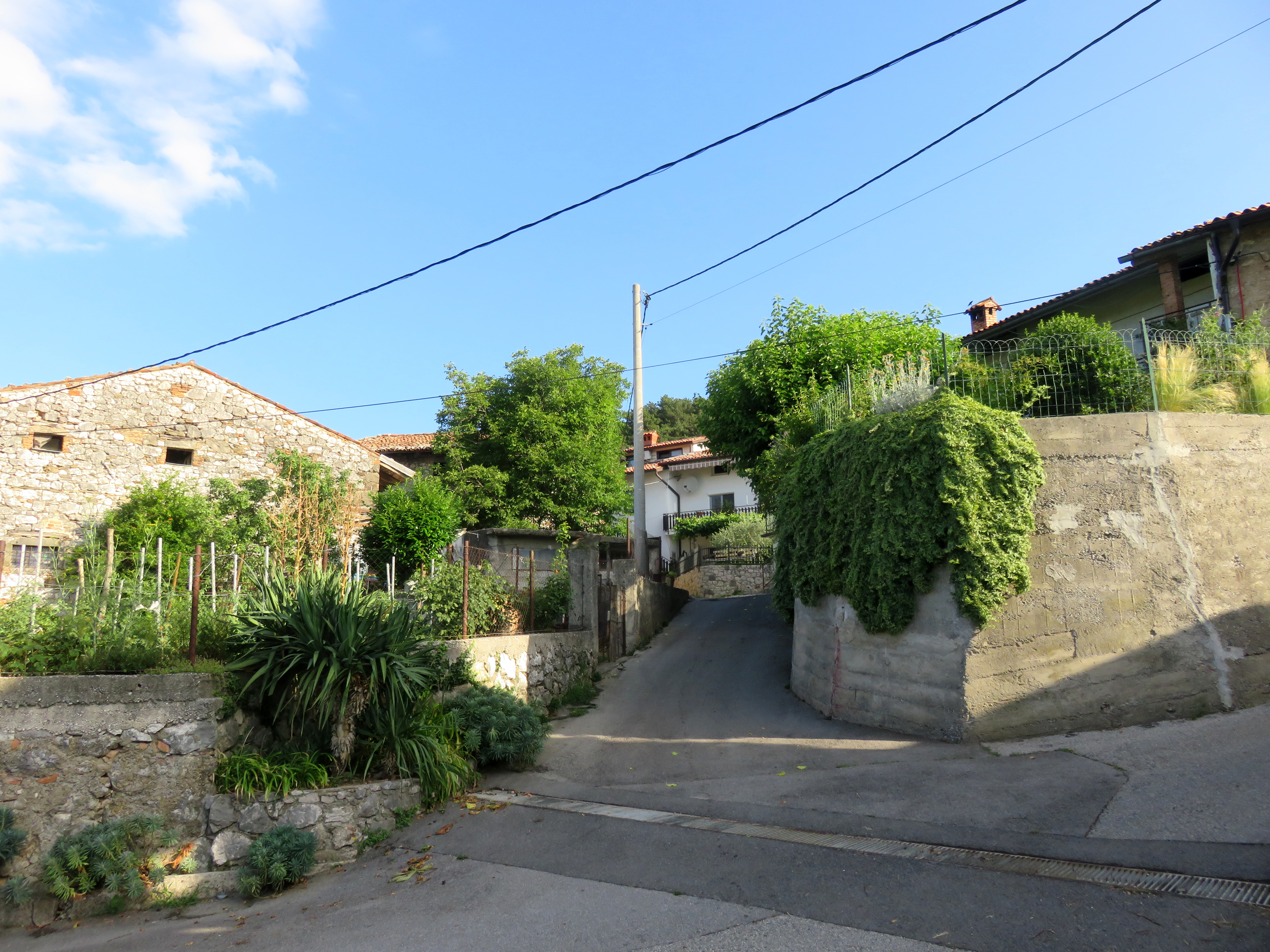

- Location in Slovenia
- Coordinates: 45°54′13.8″N 13°47′31.5″E
- Country: Slovenia
- Traditional region: Littoral
- Statistical region: Gorizia
- Municipality: Ajdovščina

Area
  - Total: 0.71 km^{2} (0.27 sq mi)
- Elevation: 187.8 m (616 ft)

Population (2020)
  - Total: 121

Malovše (pronounced [ˈmaːlɔu̯ʃɛ]) is a village on the northern edge of the Vipava Valley in the Municipality of Ajdovščina in the Littoral region of Slovenia.

== Church ==
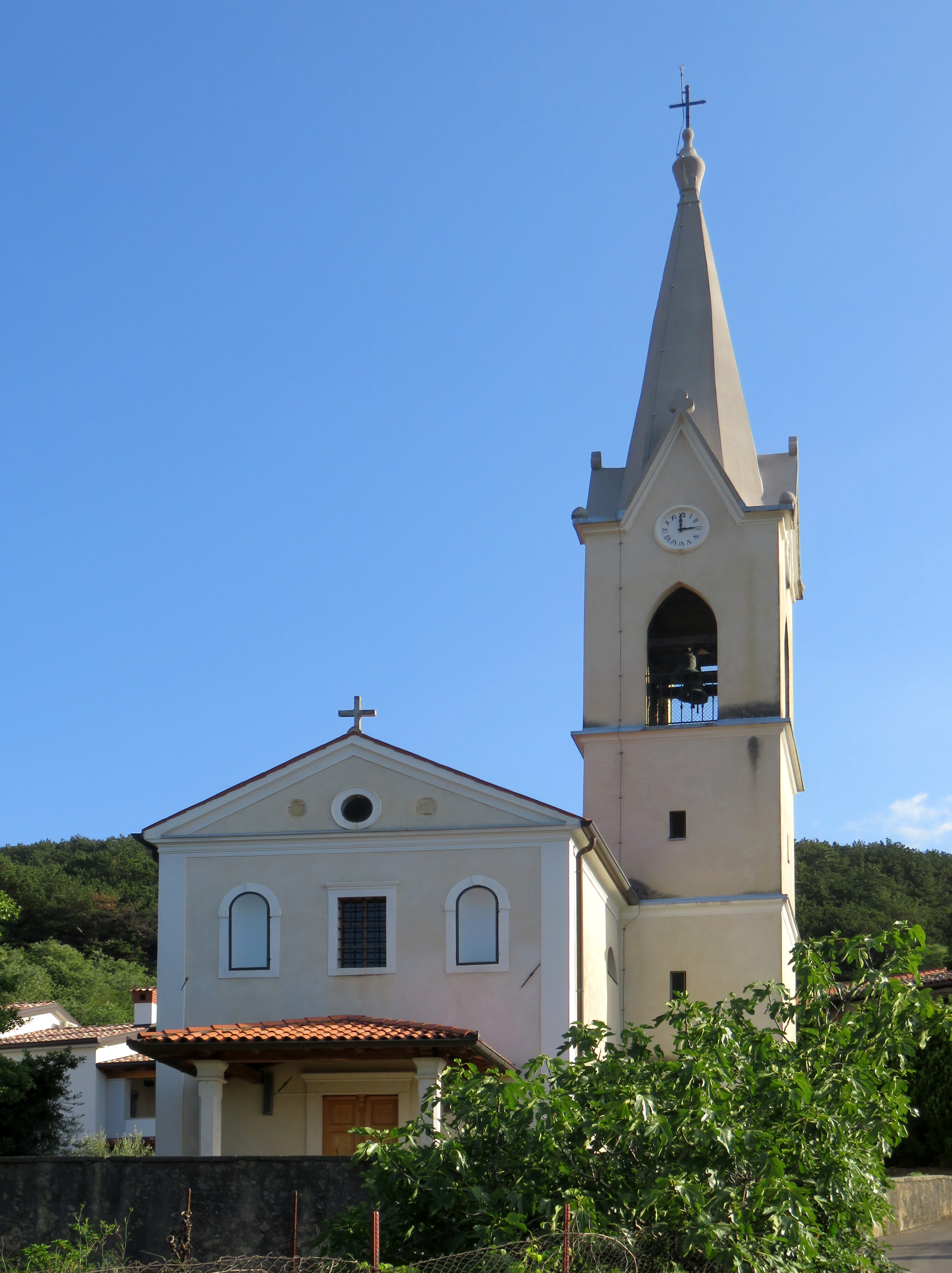
Saints Cosmas and Damian Church

The local church is dedicated to Saints Cosmas and Damian and belongs to the Parish of Črniče.
