= Bela, Ajdovščina =

Bela
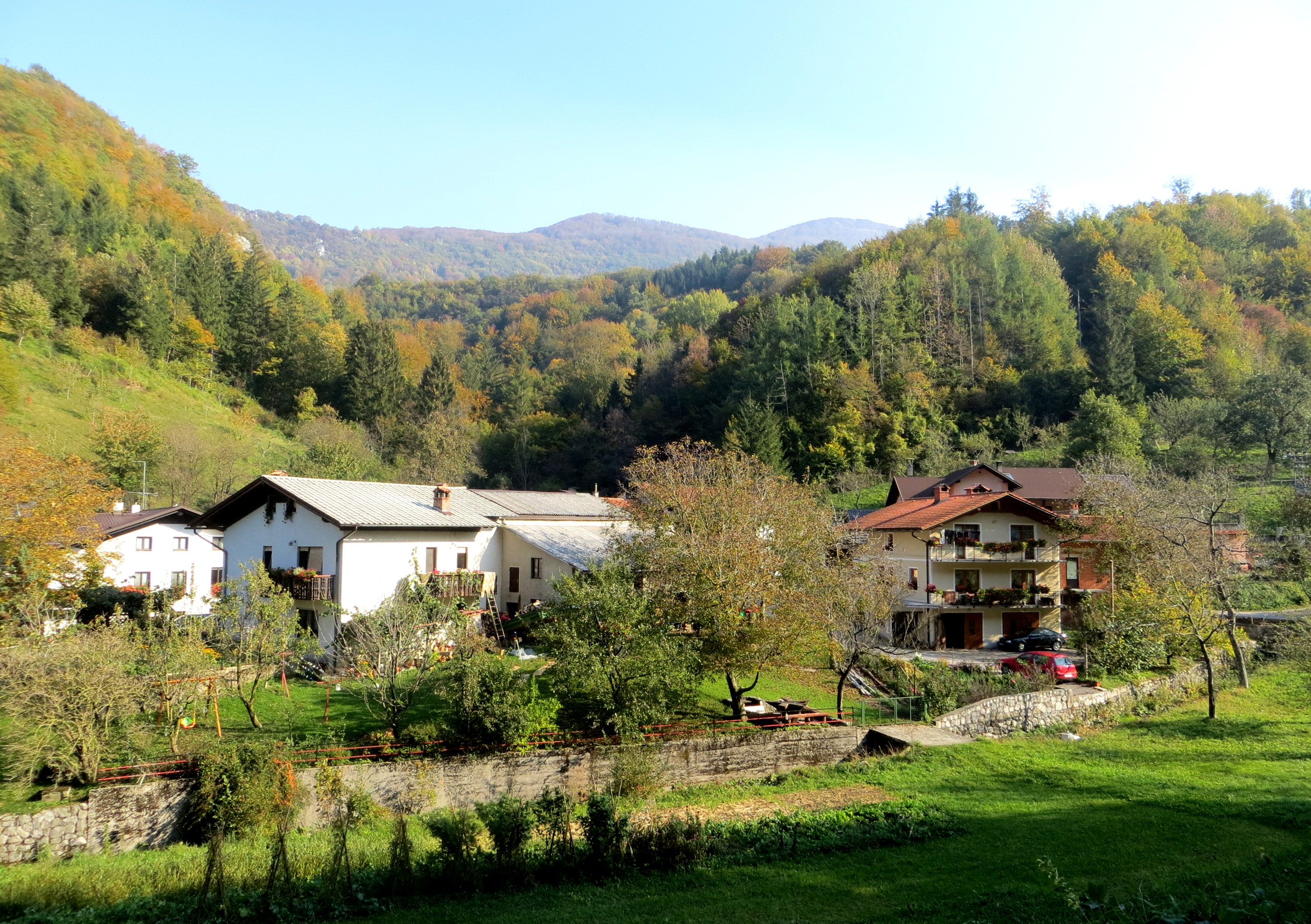

- Location in Slovenia
- Coordinates: 45°51′47.12″N 14°1′48.71″E
- Country: Slovenia
- Traditional region: Littoral
- Statistical region: Gorizia
- Municipality: Ajdovščina

Area
  - Total: 4.91 km^{2} (1.90 sq mi)
- Elevation: 541.8 m (1,778 ft)

Population (2020)
  - Total: 35
  - Density: 7.1/km^{2} (18/sq mi)

Bela (pronounced [ˈbeːla]; Italian: Bella di Vipacco) is a small settlement at the source of White Creek (Slovene: Bela), which is a tributary of the Vipava River in the Municipality of Ajdovščina in the Littoral region of Slovenia.
