= Vodice, Ajdovščina =

Vodice
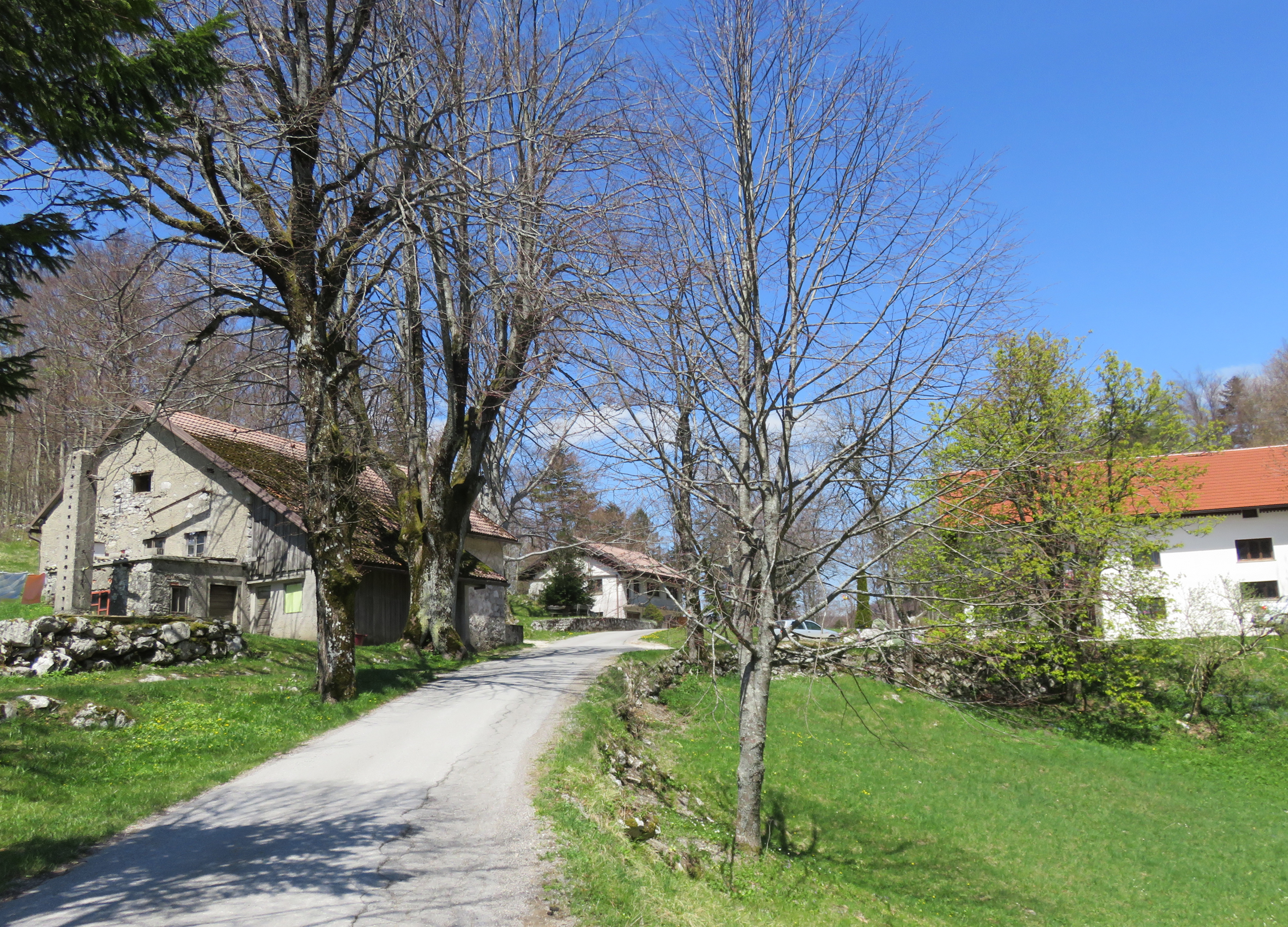
- The Koren farm in Vodice

- Location in Slovenia
- Coordinates: 45°52′45.29″N 14°4′48.11″E
- Country: Slovenia
- Traditional region: Littoral
- Statistical region: Gorizia
- Municipality: Ajdovščina

Area
  - Total: 7.01 km^{2} (2.71 sq mi)
- Elevation: 927.7 m (3,044 ft)

Population (2020)
  - Total: 66
  - Density: 9.4/km^{2} (24/sq mi)

Vodice (pronounced [ʋɔˈdiːtsɛ]) is a small dispersed settlement in the hills east of Col in the Municipality of Ajdovščina in the Littoral region of Slovenia.
