= Potoče, Ajdovščina =

Potoče
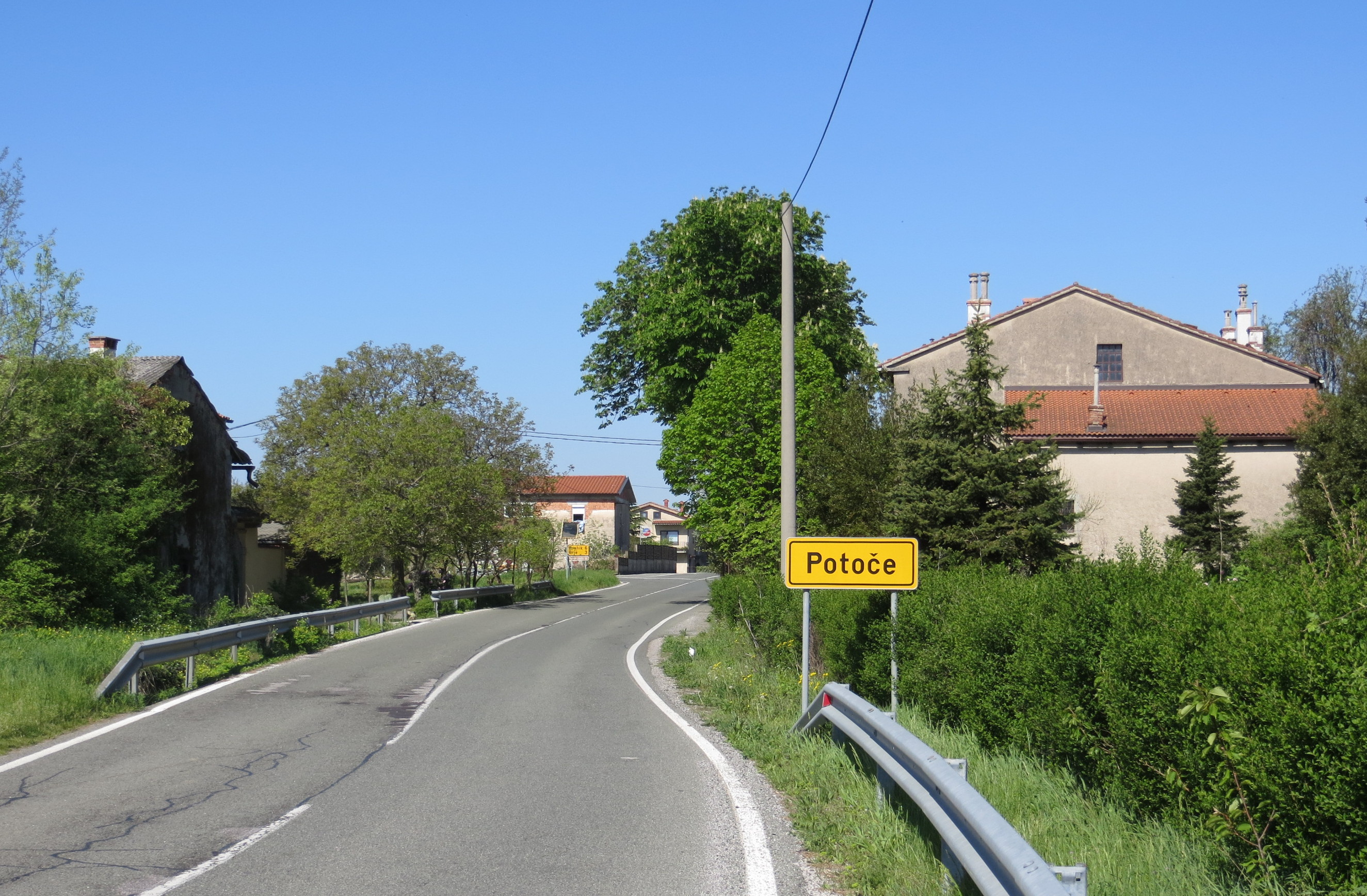

- Location in Slovenia
- Coordinates: 45°53′22.48″N 13°49′22.08″E
- Country: Slovenia
- Traditional region: Littoral
- Statistical region: Gorizia
- Municipality: Ajdovščina

Area
  - Total: 3.05 km^{2} (1.18 sq mi)
- Elevation: 120 m (390 ft)

Population (2020)
  - Total: 243
  - Density: 79.7/km^{2} (206/sq mi)

Potoče (pronounced [pɔˈtoːtʃɛ]) is a village in the Vipava Valley in the Municipality of Ajdovščina in the Littoral region of Slovenia.

== History ==
Potoče became a separate settlement in 1974, when it was administratively separated from Kamnje.
