= Plače =

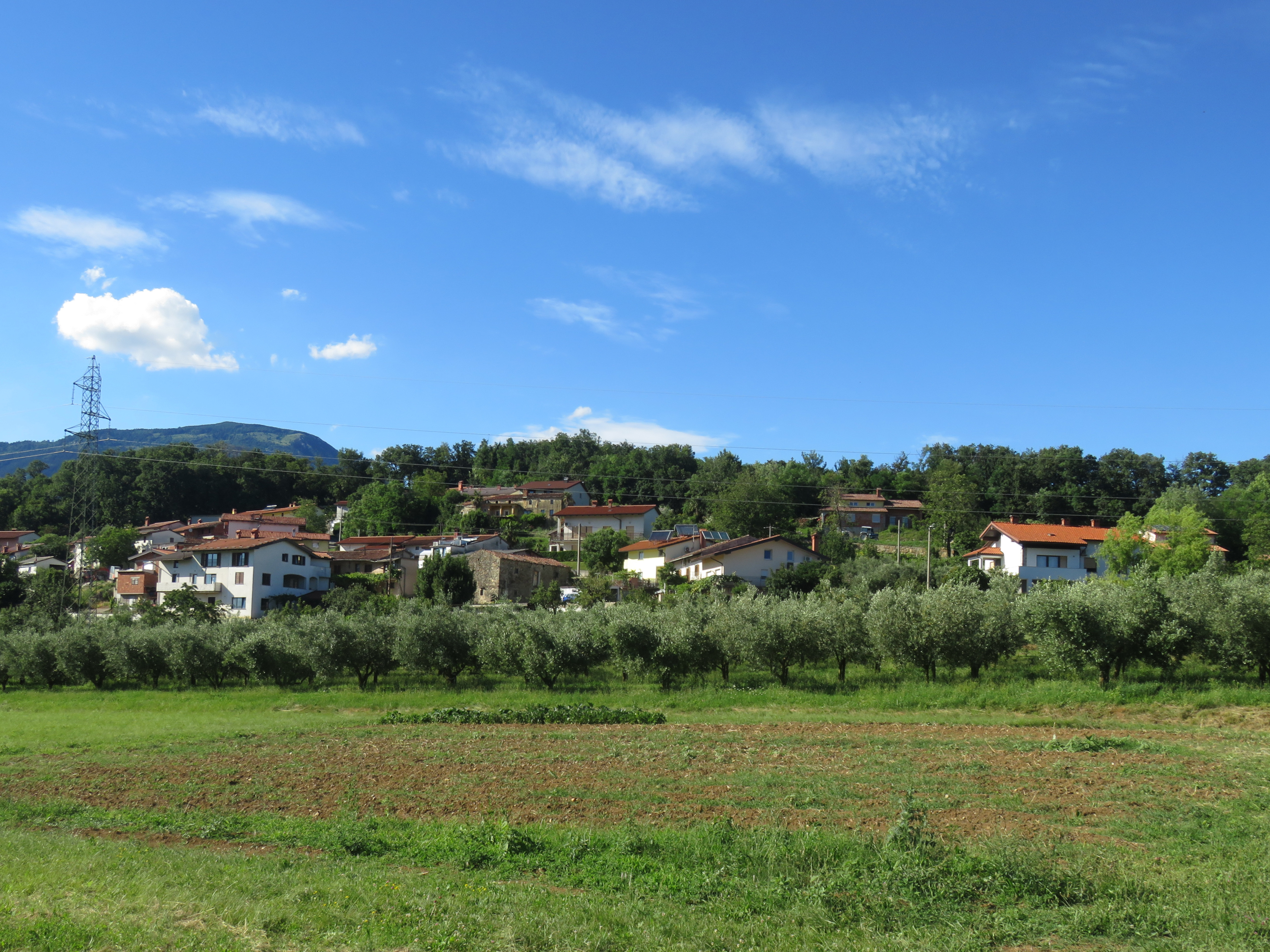
- Eastern part of the village

- Location in Slovenia
- Coordinates: 45°52′34.82″N 13°52′31.37″E
- Country: Slovenia
- Traditional region: Littoral
- Statistical region: Gorizia
- Municipality: Ajdovščina

Area
  - Total: 2.76 km^{2} (1.07 sq mi)
- Elevation: 143.7 m (471 ft)

Population (2020)
  - Total: 257
  - Density: 93.1/km^{2} (241/sq mi)

Plače (pronounced [ˈplaːtʃɛ]) is a small settlement in the Vipava Valley in the Municipality of Ajdovščina in the Littoral region of Slovenia. Together with the neighbouring villages of Male Žablje and Vipavski Križ it forms the local community of Vipavski Križ.
