= Da Col =

Da Col is an Italian surname. Notable people with the surname include:

- Alessandro da Col (born 1978), retired Italian tennis player
- Bruno Da Col (1913–1995), Italian ski jumper

== See also ==
- Col (disambiguation)
- De Col
