= Municipality of Ajdovščina =

Municipality of Slovenia

Municipality of Ajdovščina Občina Ajdovščina
- Municipality
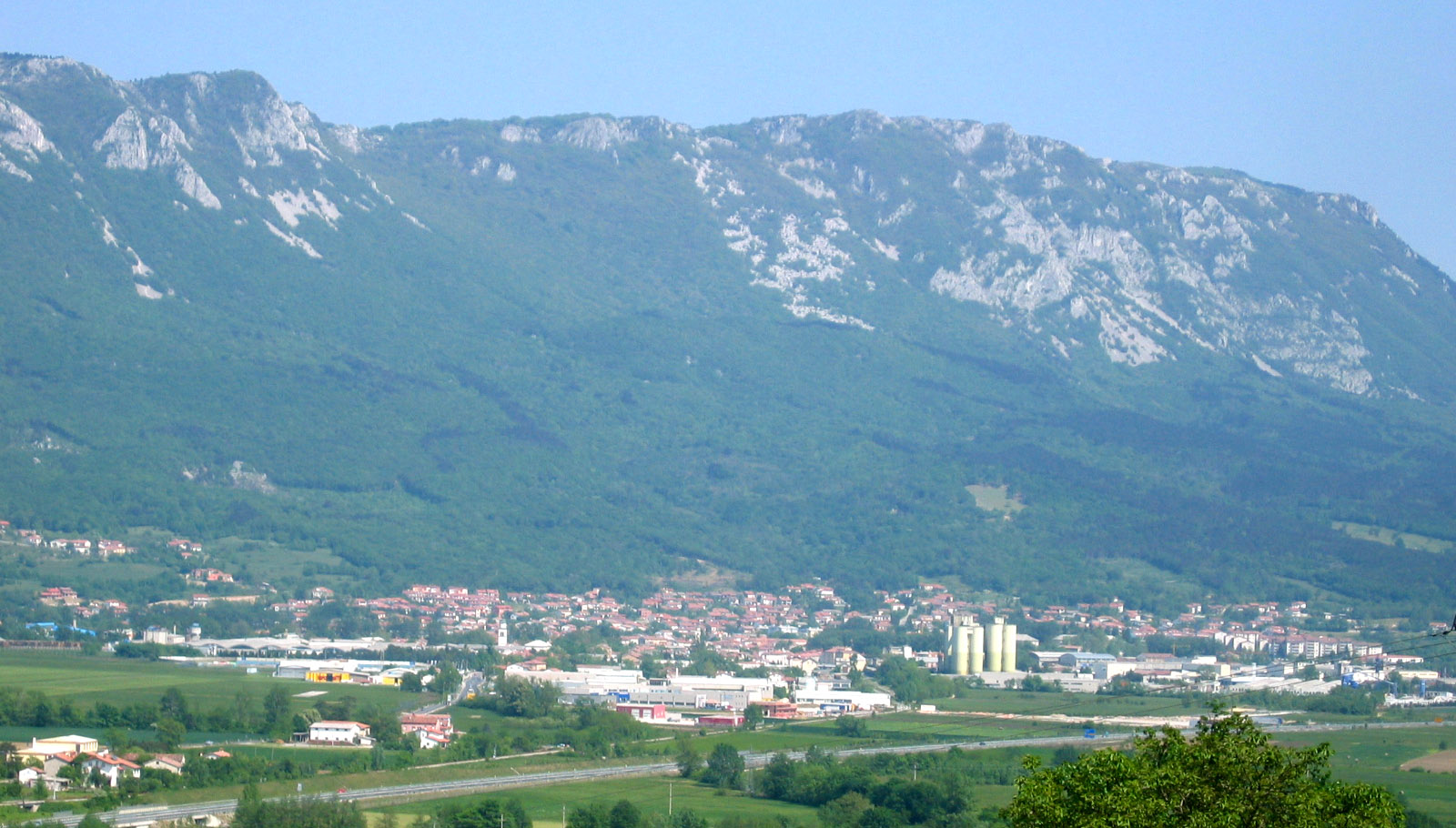

- Location of the Municipality of Ajdovščina in Slovenia
- Coordinates: 45°53′N 13°55′E
- Country: Slovenia

Government
  - Mayor: Tadej Beočanin (SD)

Area
  - Total: 245.2 km^{2} (94.7 sq mi)

Population (July 1, 2018)
  - Total: 19,154
  - Density: 77/km^{2} (200/sq mi)
- Time zone: UTC+01 (CET)
  - Summer (DST): UTC+02 (CEST)
- Vehicle registration: GO
- Website: ajdovscina.si

The Municipality of Ajdovščina (pronounced [ˈaːi̯dɔu̯ʃtʃina]; Slovene: Občina Ajdovščina) is a municipality with a population of a little over 19,000 located in the Vipava Valley, southwestern Slovenia. The municipality was established in 1994. Its seat is in the town of Ajdovščina. As of 2020, its mayor is Tadej Beočanin.

Ajdovščina is part of the Slovene Littoral traditional region as well as modern Gorizia statistical region.

The climate is influenced by the Mediterranean (minimum temperature in winter −1 °C (30 °F), maximum 17 °C (63 °F); in the summer time maximum temperature 39 °C (102 °F), minimum 20 °C (68 °F). Its characteristic is the bora wind, which may reach the speeds over 200 kilometres per hour (120 mph).

== Settlements ==
In addition to the municipal seat of Ajdovščina, the municipality includes the following settlements:

- Batuje
- Bela
- Brje
- Budanje
- Cesta
- Col
- Črniče
- Dobravlje
- Dolenje
- Dolga Poljana
- Gaberje
- Gojače
- Gozd
- Grivče
- Kamnje
- Kovk
- Kožmani
- Križna Gora
- Lokavec
- Male Žablje
- Malo Polje
- Malovše
- Otlica
- Plače
- Planina
- Podkraj
- Potoče
- Predmeja
- Ravne
- Selo
- Skrilje
- Šmarje
- Stomaž
- Tevče
- Ustje
- Velike Žablje
- Vipavski Križ
- Višnje
- Vodice
- Vrtovče
- Vrtovin
- Žagolič
- Žapuže
- Zavino

== Demographics ==
Population by native language, 2002 census:

- Slovene: 16,760
- Serbo-Croatian: 787
- Albanian: 164
- Macedonian: 40
- Italian: 16
- Hungarian: 7
- German: 3
- Others: 38
- Unknown: 380

== Notable residents ==
- Martin Baučer (1595–1668), historian
- Ivo Boscarol (born 1956), entrepreneur
- Anton Čebej (1722–1774), painter
- Miša Cigoj (born 1982), dancesport athlete
- Josip Križaj (1911–1948), aviator
- Tobia Lionelli (1647–1714), preacher
- Karel Lavrič (1818–1876), politician
- Danilo Lokar (1892–1989), author
- Veno Pilon (1896–1970), painter
- Marijan Poljšak (born 1945), politician
- Edi Šelhaus (1919–2011), photographer, photojournalist
- Avgust Žigon (1877–1941), literary historian
