= Križna Gora, Ajdovščina =

Križna Gora
- Location in Slovenia
- Coordinates: 45°54′20.95″N 13°59′51.43″E
- Country: Slovenia
- Traditional region: Littoral
- Statistical region: Gorizia
- Municipality: Ajdovščina

Area
  - Total: 8.13 km^{2} (3.14 sq mi)
- Elevation: 907.4 m (2,977 ft)

Population (2020)
  - Total: 7

Križna Gora (pronounced [ˈkɾiːʒna ˈɡɔːɾa]) is a dispersed settlement in the hills north of Col in the Municipality of Ajdovščina in the Littoral region of Slovenia.
