= Skrilje =

- Location in Slovenia
- Coordinates: 45°53′31.87″N 13°50′56.98″E
- Country: Slovenia
- Traditional region: Littoral
- Statistical region: Gorizia
- Municipality: Ajdovščina

Area
  - Total: 1.45 km^{2} (0.56 sq mi)
- Elevation: 150.8 m (495 ft)

Population (2020)
  - Total: 317
  - Density: 219/km^{2} (566/sq mi)

Skrilje (pronounced [ˈskɾiːljɛ]) is a village in the Vipava Valley in the Municipality of Ajdovščina in the Littoral region of Slovenia. It is divided into three smaller hamlets: Valiči, Ruštji, and Bajči.

The local church is dedicated to Saint Margaret of Antioch and belongs to the Parish of Kamnje.
