= Šmarje =

Šmarje may refer to the following settlements in Slovenia:

- Šmarje, Ajdovščina, a settlement in Littoral
- Šmarje, Grosuplje, a formerly independent settlement in Šmarje–Sap, Grosuplje, Lower Carniola
- Šmarje, Koper, a village in Littoral
- Šmarje, Šentjernej, a settlement in Lower Carniola
- Šmarje pri Jelšah, a town in Styria
