= Višnje, Ajdovščina =

Višnje
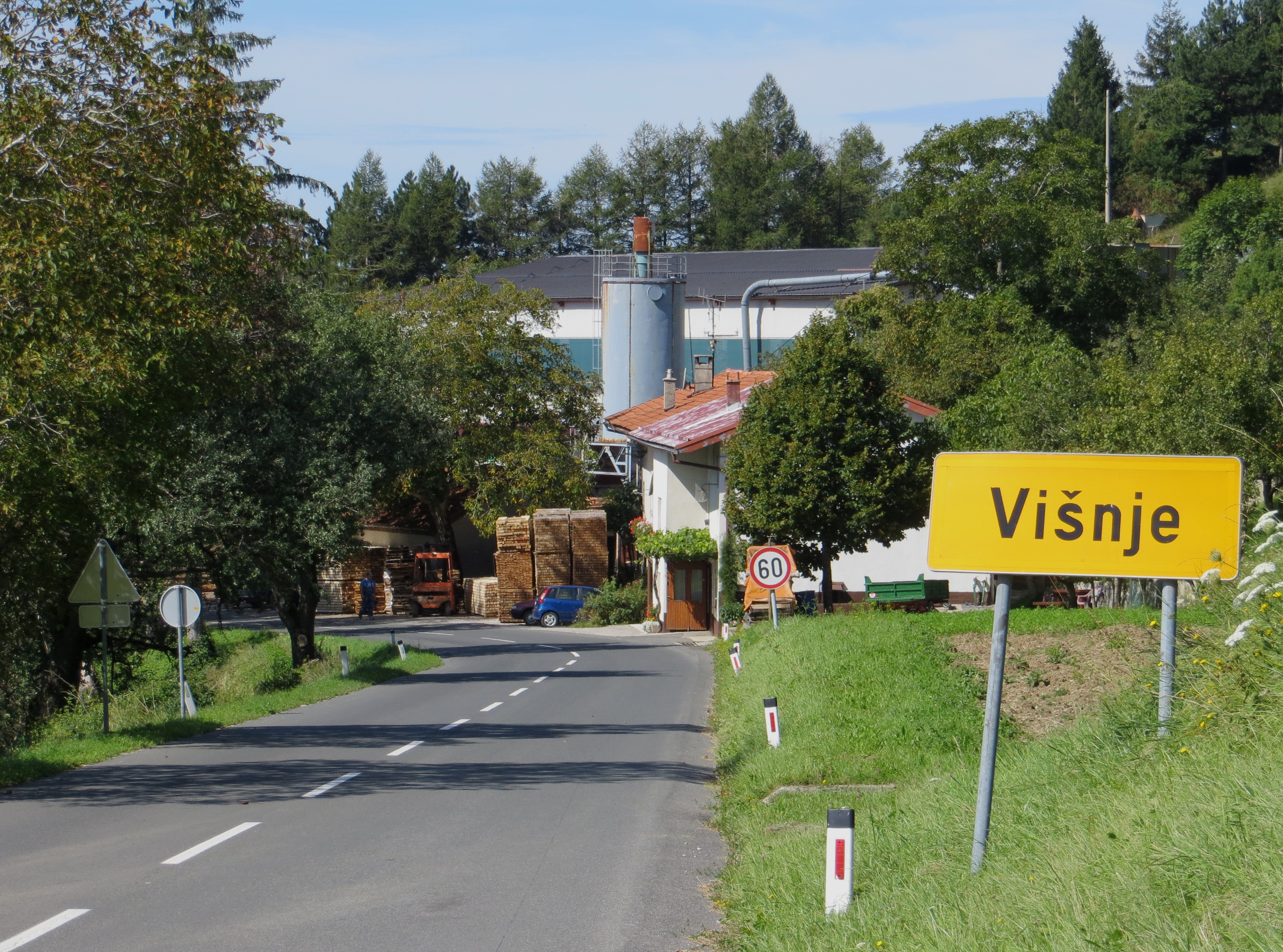

- Location in Slovenia
- Coordinates: 45°52′18.97″N 14°1′23.58″E
- Country: Slovenia
- Traditional region: Littoral
- Statistical region: Gorizia
- Municipality: Ajdovščina

Area
  - Total: 2.75 km^{2} (1.06 sq mi)
- Elevation: 713.4 m (2,341 ft)

Population (2020)
  - Total: 194
  - Density: 70.5/km^{2} (183/sq mi)

Višnje (pronounced [ˈʋiːʃnjɛ]; Italian: Visne) is a village southeast of Col in the Municipality of Ajdovščina in the Littoral region of Slovenia.
