= De Col =

De Col (or de Col) is a surname. Notable people with this surname include:

- Alessandro de Col, Italian double scull rower and medalist in team with Michelangelo Bernasconi
- Elettra de Col (born 1987), Italian curler
- Filippo De Col (born 1993), Italian football right defender

== See also ==
- Col (disambiguation)
- Da Col
