= Male Žablje =

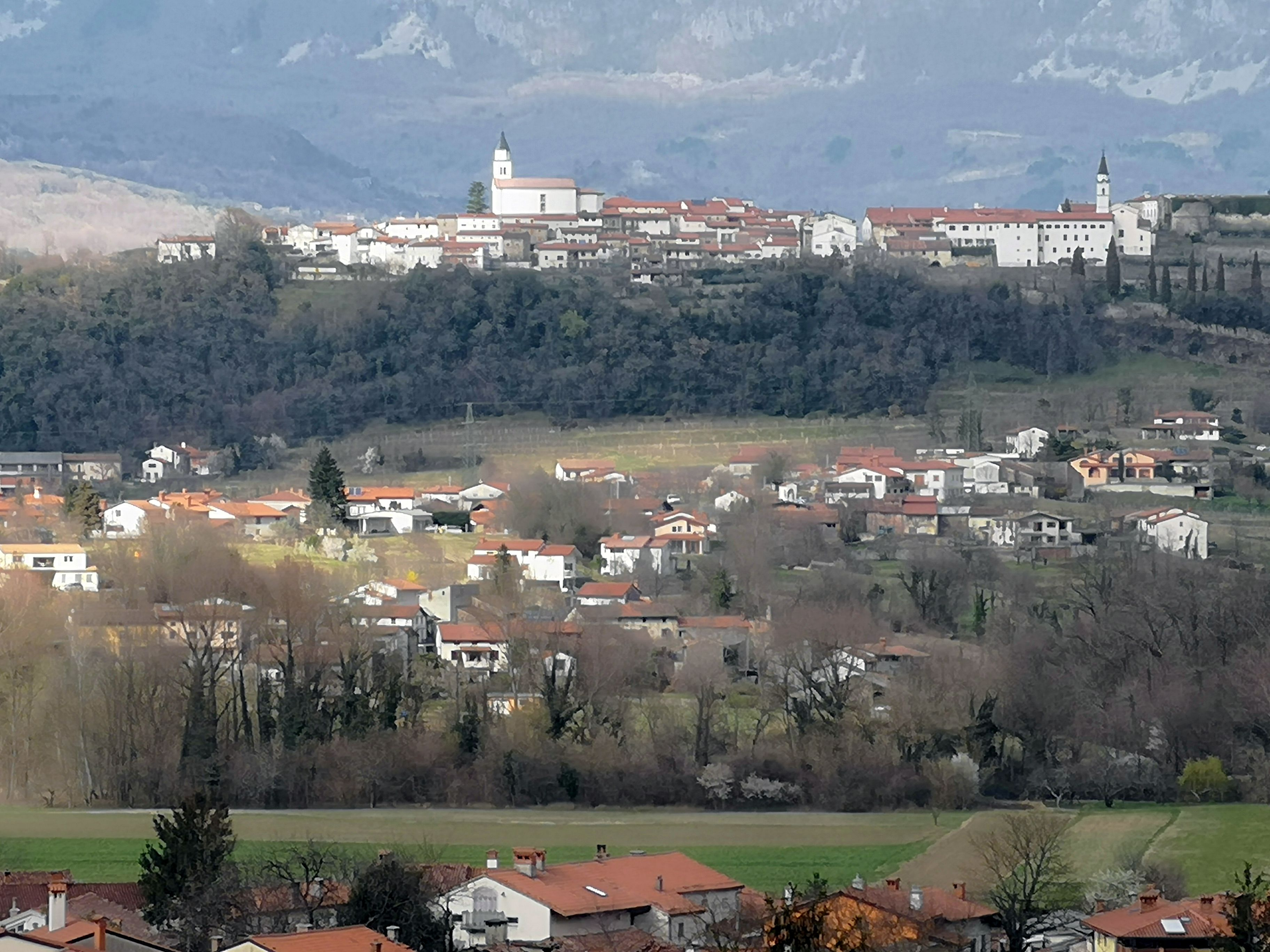
- Male Žablje in the front and Vipavski Križ in the back

- Location in Slovenia
- Coordinates: 45°52′35.53″N 13°51′29.26″E
- Country: Slovenia
- Traditional region: Littoral
- Statistical region: Gorizia
- Municipality: Ajdovščina

Area
  - Total: 1.15 km^{2} (0.44 sq mi)
- Elevation: 109.7 m (360 ft)

Population (2020)
  - Total: 337
  - Density: 293/km^{2} (759/sq mi)

Male Žablje (pronounced [ˈmaːlɛ ˈʒaːbljɛ]) is a settlement on the right bank of the Vipava River, south of Vipavski Križ, in the Municipality of Ajdovščina in the Littoral region of Slovenia.

== Name ==
The name Male Žablje literally means 'little Žablje', contrasting with neighboring Velike Žablje (literally, 'big Žablje'). Like related toponyms (e.g., Žabnica, Žabče, and Žablje), the name is derived from the Slovene common noun žaba 'frog', referring to a settlement near a wetland where frogs live.
