= Gojače =

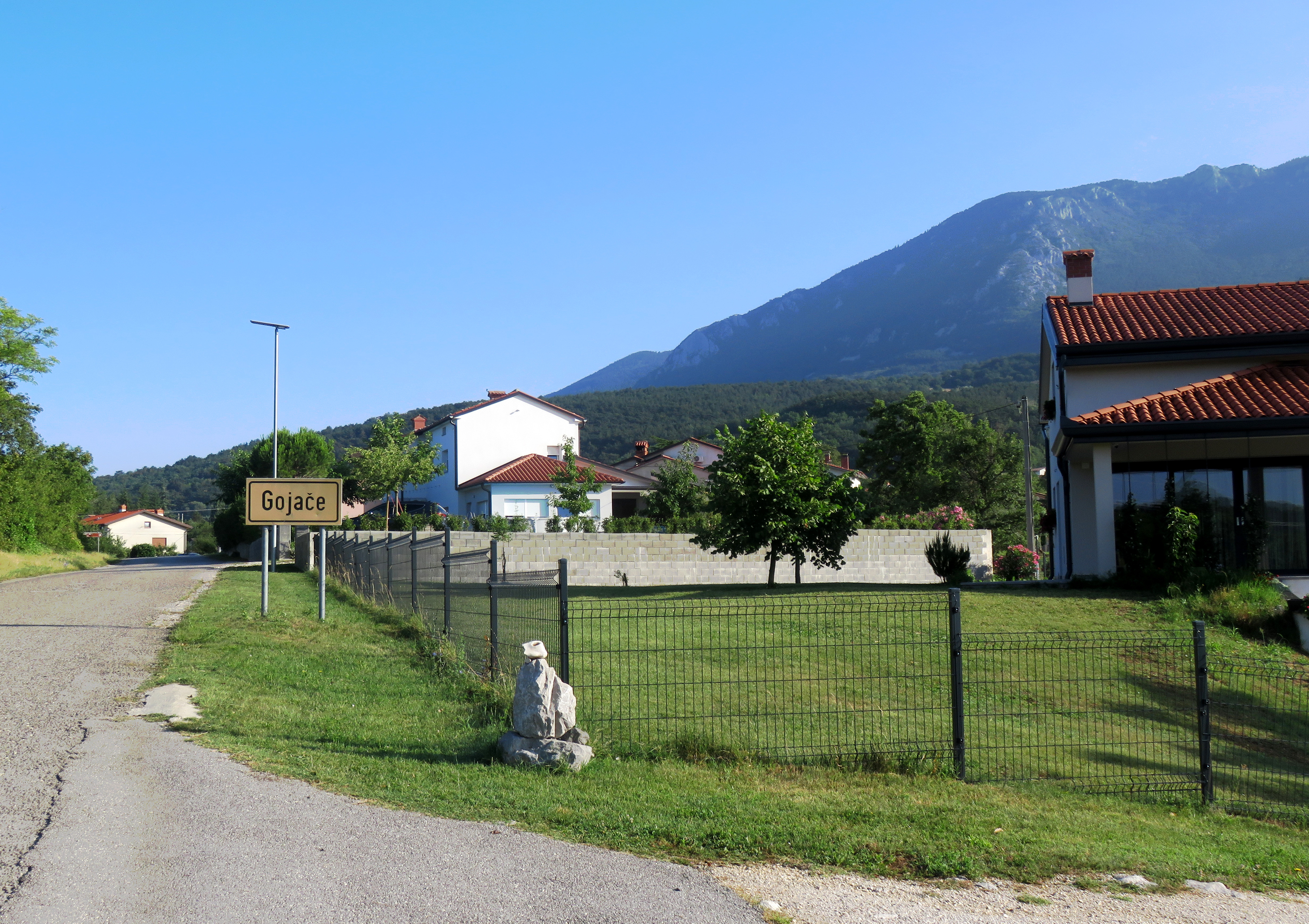

- Location in Slovenia
- Coordinates: 45°54′6.53″N 13°47′48.36″E
- Country: Slovenia
- Traditional region: Littoral
- Statistical region: Gorizia
- Municipality: Ajdovščina

Area
  - Total: 5 km^{2} (1.9 sq mi)
- Elevation: 180 m (590 ft)

Population (2020)
  - Total: 190

Gojače (pronounced [ɡɔˈjaːtʃɛ]; Italian: Goiaci) is a village on the edge of the Vipava Valley in the Municipality of Ajdovščina in the Littoral region of Slovenia.

== Church ==
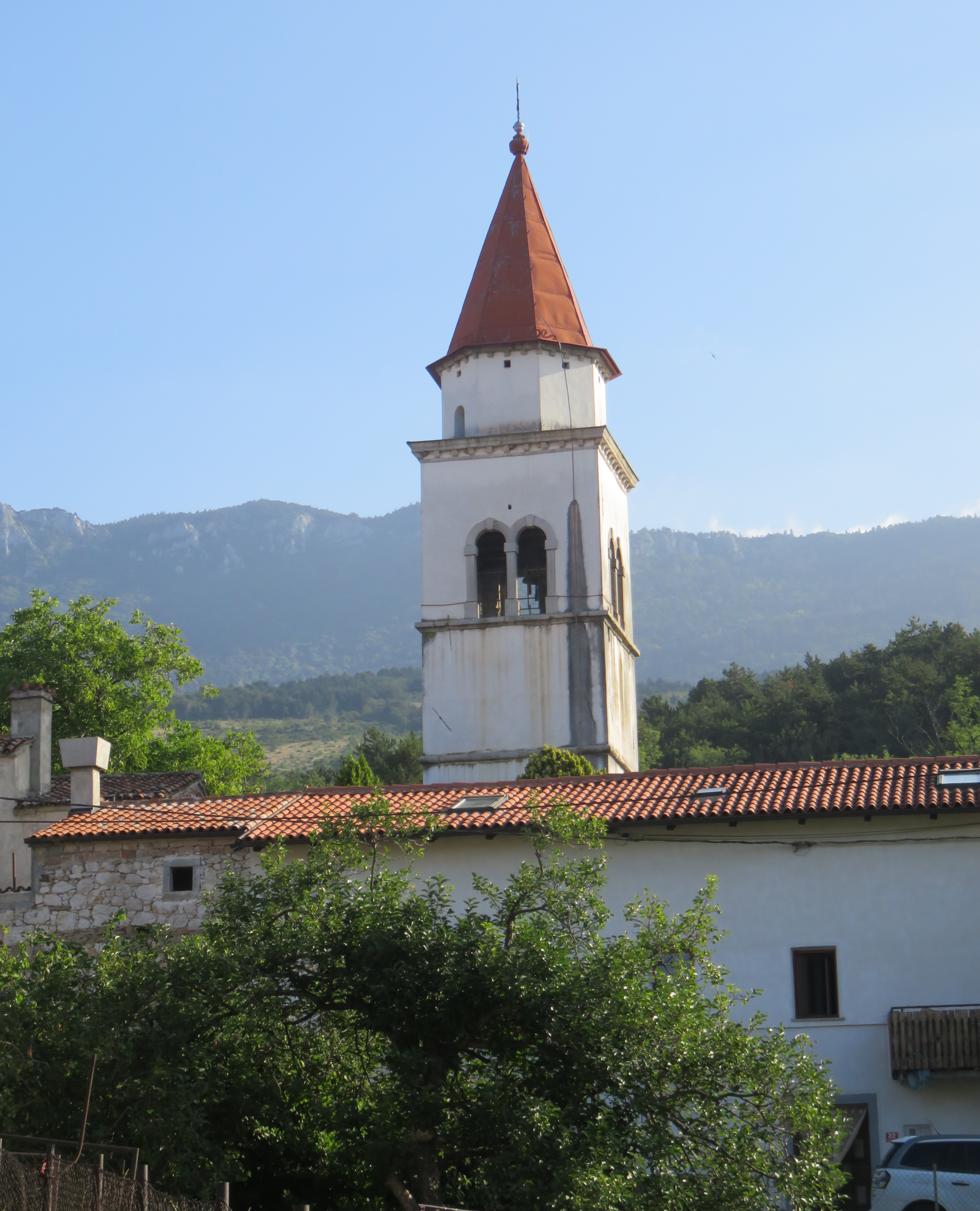
Saint Justus's Church

The church in the settlement is dedicated to Saint Justus and belongs to the Parish of Črniče. It contains paintings by the Baroque painter Anton Čebej.
