= Ravne, Ajdovščina =

Ravne
- Location in Slovenia
- Coordinates: 45°54′57.88″N 13°47′3.16″E
- Country: Slovenia
- Traditional region: Littoral
- Statistical region: Gorizia
- Municipality: Ajdovščina

Area
  - Total: 12.61 km^{2} (4.87 sq mi)
- Elevation: 311.5 m (1,022 ft)

Population (2020)
  - Total: 142
  - Density: 11.3/km^{2} (29.2/sq mi)

Ravne (pronounced [ˈɾáːwnɛ]) is a settlement in the Municipality of Ajdovščina in the Littoral region of Slovenia.

The local church is dedicated to Saints John and Paul and belongs to the Parish of Črniče.
