= Brje =

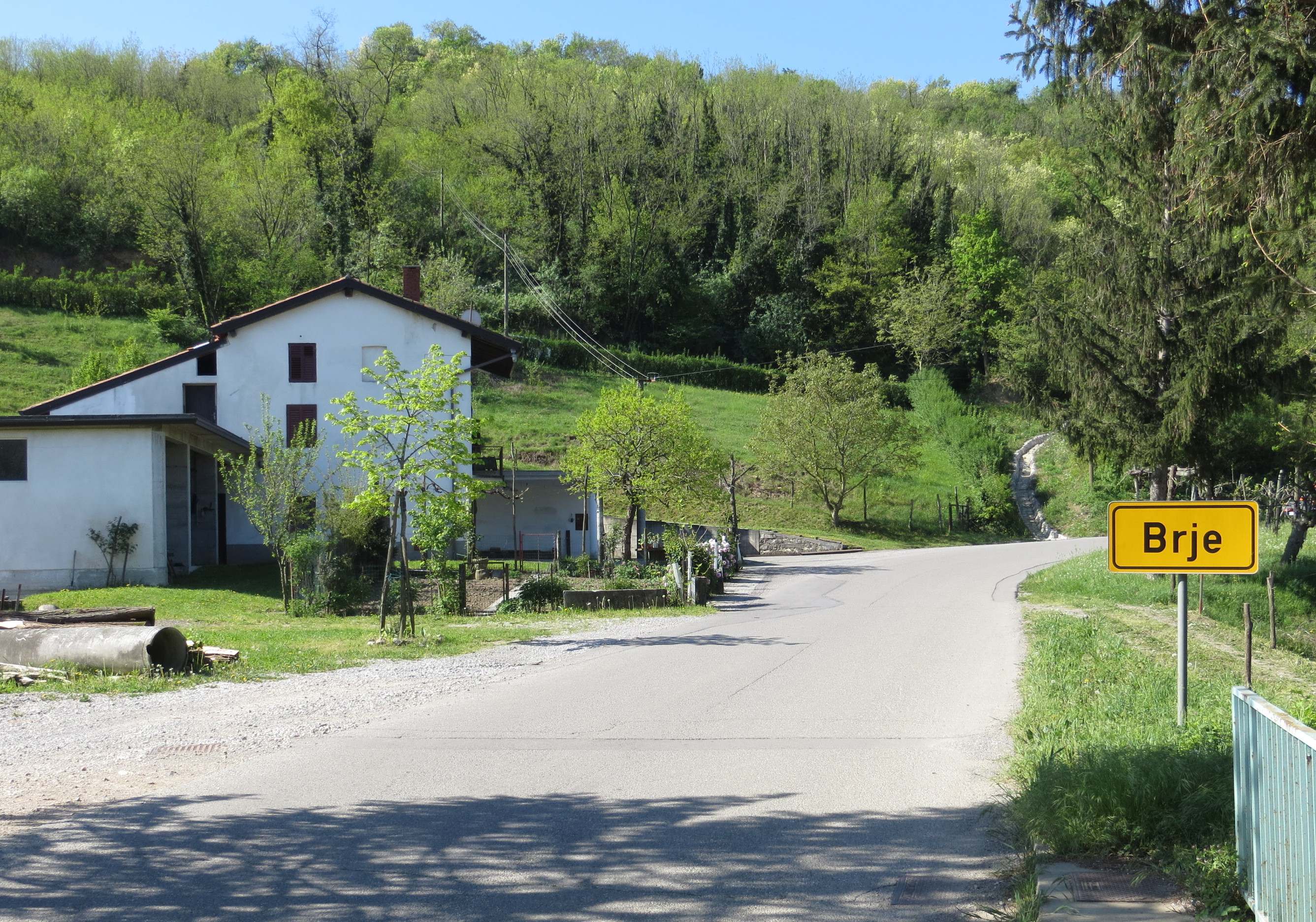

- Location in Slovenia
- Coordinates: 45°52′6.4″N 13°48′54.94″E
- Country: Slovenia
- Traditional region: Littoral
- Statistical region: Gorizia
- Municipality: Ajdovščina

Area
  - Total: 5.34 km^{2} (2.06 sq mi)
- Elevation: 167.3 m (549 ft)

Population (2020)
  - Total: 428
  - Density: 71/km^{2} (180/sq mi)

Brje (pronounced [ˈbəːɾjɛ]; Italian: Bria dei Furlani) is a settlement in the hills on the left bank of the Vipava River in the Municipality of Ajdovščina in the Littoral region of Slovenia. It is made up of eleven hamlets: Kasovlje, Nečilec, Most, Kodrovi, Pečenkovi, Martini, Mihelji, Žulji, Cinki, Furlani, and Sveti Martin.

== Churches ==
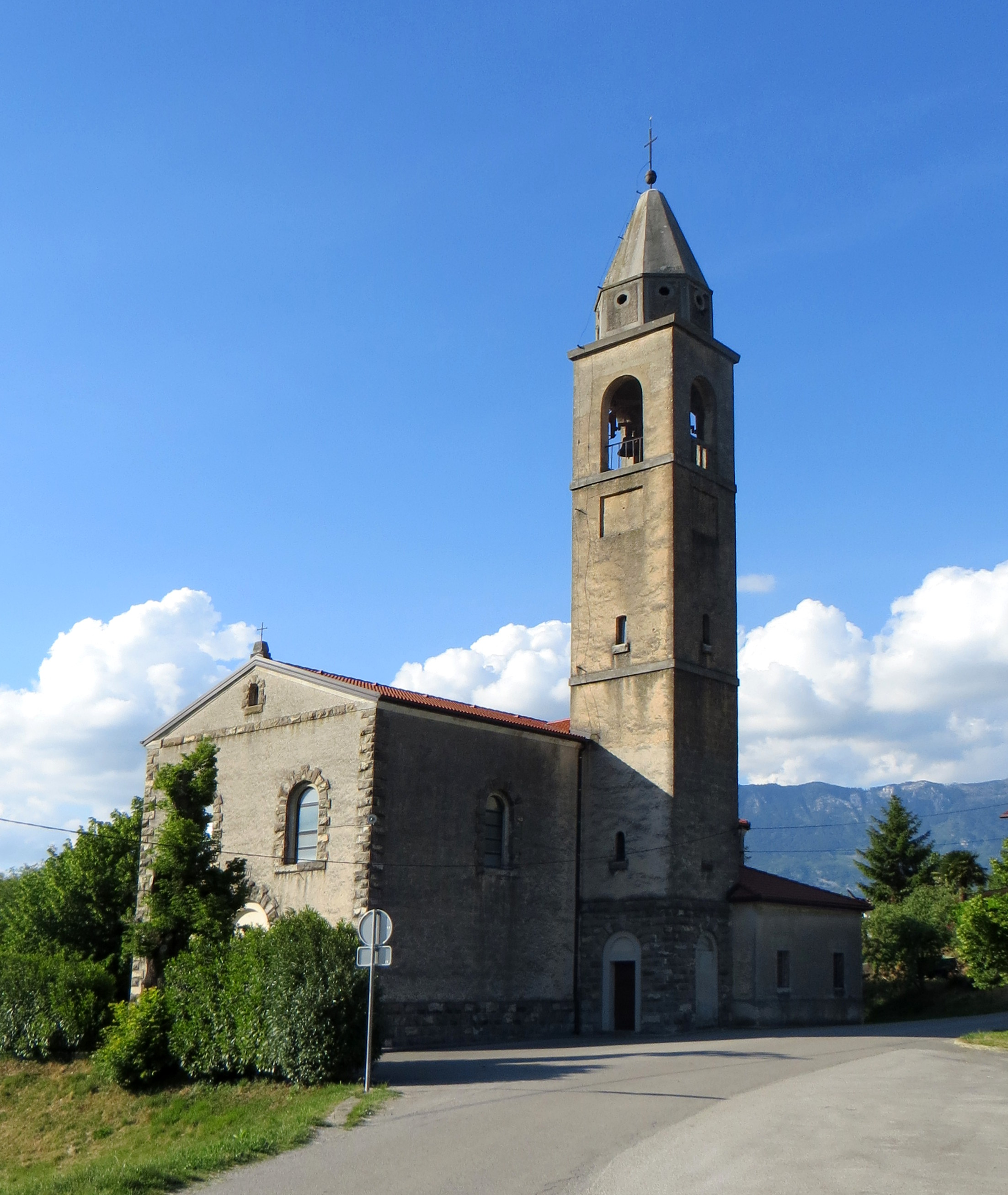
Saints Cyril and Methodius Church

The parish church in the settlement is dedicated to Saints Cyril and Methodius and belongs to the Koper Diocese. A second church belonging to the parish is dedicated to Saint Martin and is built on top of a hill in the hamlet of Sveti Martin, which gets its name from the church Saint Martin's Church contains ceramic artworks by Peter Černe.

=== Gallery ===
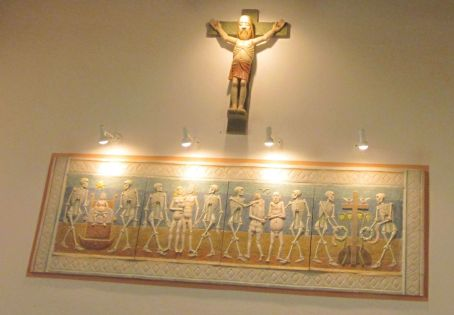
Ceramic by Peter Černe

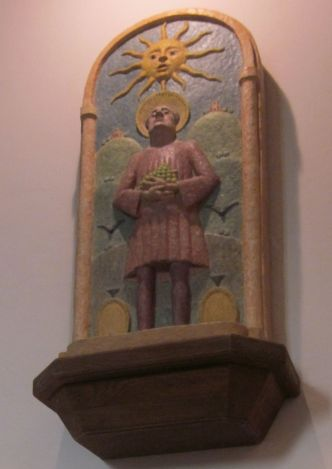
Ceramic by Peter Černe
