= Malo Polje, Ajdovščina =

Malo Polje
- Location in Slovenia
- Coordinates: 45°53′18.82″N 14°1′14.18″E
- Country: Slovenia
- Traditional region: Littoral
- Statistical region: Gorizia
- Municipality: Ajdovščina

Area
  - Total: 7.91 km^{2} (3.05 sq mi)
- Elevation: 786.2 m (2,579 ft)

Population (2020)
  - Total: 71

Malo Polje (pronounced [ˈmaːlɔ ˈpoːljɛ]) is a small settlement in the hills northeast of Col in the Municipality of Ajdovščina in the Littoral region of Slovenia.
