= Kožmani =

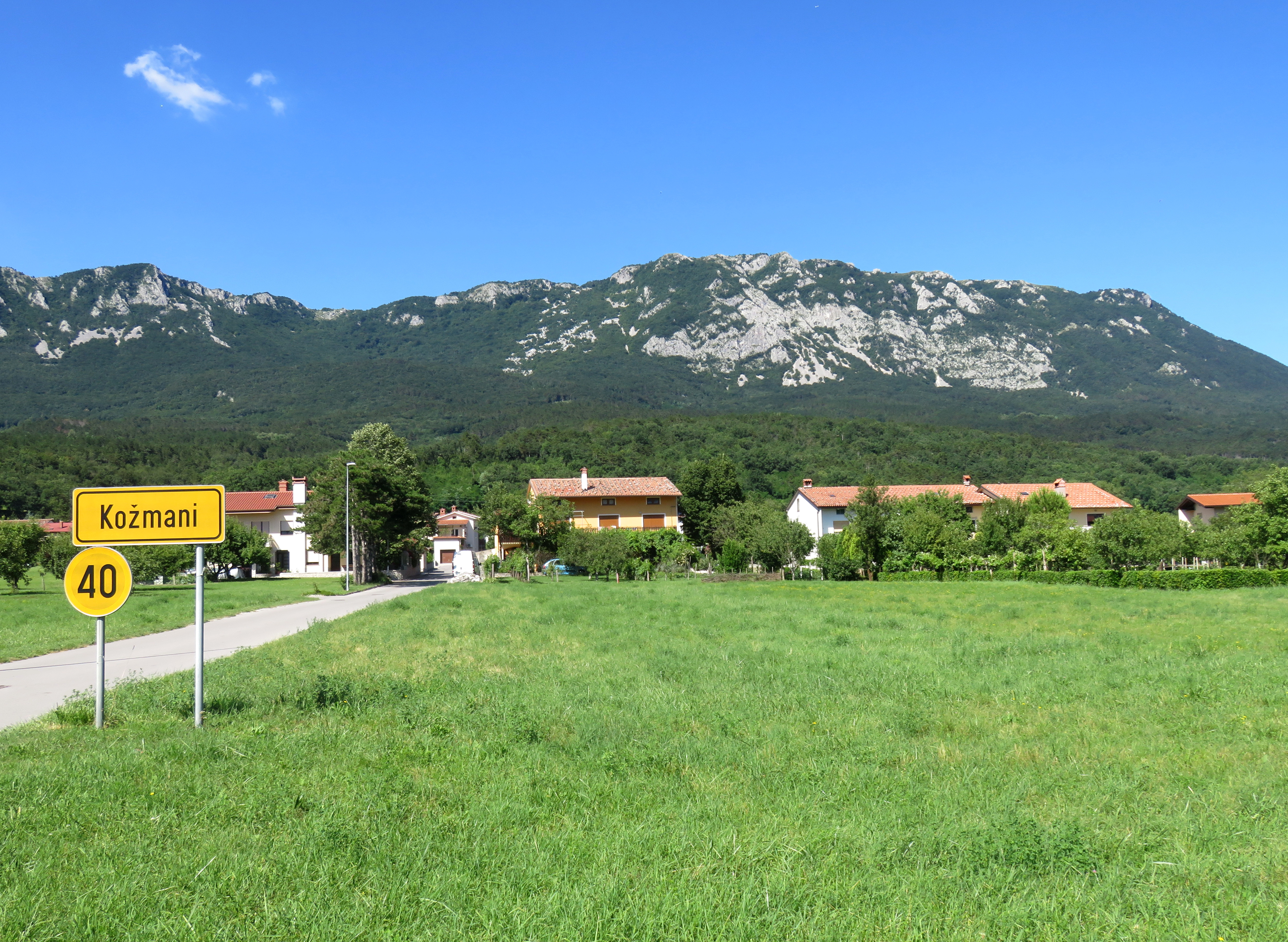

- Location in Slovenia
- Coordinates: 45°52′40.97″N 13°55′19.6″E
- Country: Slovenia
- Traditional region: Littoral
- Statistical region: Gorizia
- Municipality: Ajdovščina

Area
  - Total: 0.43 km^{2} (0.17 sq mi)
- Elevation: 113.6 m (373 ft)

Population (2020)
  - Total: 112

Kožmani (pronounced [ˈkoːʒmani]) is a settlement on the southeastern outskirts of Ajdovščina in the Littoral region of Slovenia.
