= Col (disambiguation) =

A col is the lowest point on a mountain ridge between two peaks; a mountain pass or saddle.

COL, CoL or col may also refer to:

== Computers ==
- Caldera OpenLinux, a defunct Linux distribution
- <col></col>, an HTML element specifying a column
- A collision signal in Ethernet

== Language ==
- Col language, a Malayan language of Sumatra
- Columbia-Wenatchi language (ISO 639-3: col)

== Organisations ==
- COL Group, Chinese company
- Commonwealth of Learning
- compLexity Gaming, eSports organization

== Places ==
- Col, Ajdovščina, Slovenia
- Col, Italy
- The Gaelic name for the village of Coll, Lewis, Scotland
- Colorado, United States
- Columbus, Ohio (station code: COL)
- CoL, City of London
- CoL, City of Leeds

== Other uses ==
- Colorado Avalanche, a National Hockey League team that uses this abbreviation for box scores and television scoring displays
- Colorado Rockies, a Major League Baseball team that uses this abbreviation for box scores and television scoring displays
- Col (game), a pencil and paper map-coloring game
- Col (meteorology), a trough of lower air pressure between two high-pressure areas in the weather
- City of license, in broadcasting
- Colac railway station, Australia
- Cost of living (disambiguation)
- Columba (constellation)
- Combined Construction and Operating License, for US nuclear power reactors
- Costa Oriental del Lago, Zulia, Venezuela
- Col., military rank of colonel
- Cartridge Overall Length, an abbreviation used in handloading of firearms
- Catalogue of Life

== See also ==
- Coll (disambiguation)
- Colle (disambiguation)
- Cole (disambiguation)
- Coal (disambiguation)
