= Coll (disambiguation) =

Coll is an island in the Inner Hebrides of Scotland.

Coll may also refer to:

== People ==
- Coll (surname)

== Places ==
- Coll, Lewis, a village on the island of Lewis and Harris in Scotland
- Cóll, a village in the municipality of Vall de Boí in Catalonia, Spain
- Coll de Nargó, a municipality in the comarca of the Alt Urgell in Catalonia, Spain
- El Coll, a neighbourhood of Barcelona, Catalonia, Spain

== Other uses ==
- Coll (letter), ninth letter of the Ogham alphabet
- Coll (character), character in The Chronicles of Prydain by Lloyd Alexander

== See also ==
- Col (disambiguation)
