= Budanje =

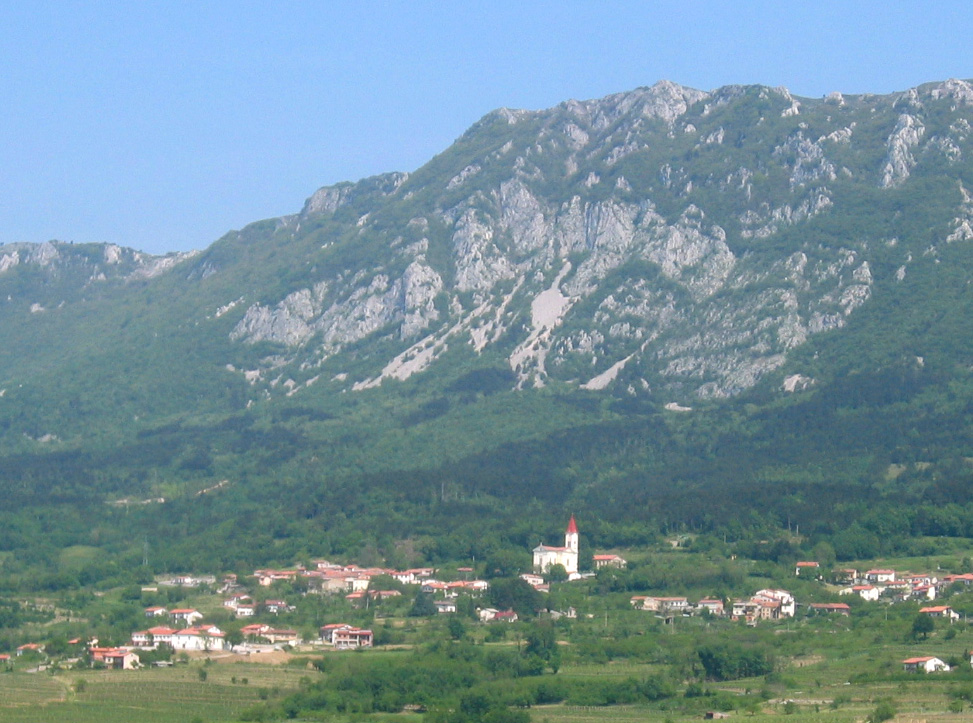

- Location in Slovenia
- Coordinates: 45°52′25.48″N 13°57′6.6″E
- Country: Slovenia
- Traditional region: Inner Carniola
- Statistical region: Gorizia
- Municipality: Ajdovščina

Area
  - Total: 5.28 km^{2} (2.04 sq mi)
- Elevation: 239.8 m (787 ft)

Population (2020)
  - Total: 842
  - Metro density: 154/km^{2} (400/sq mi)
- Postal code: 5271

Budanje (pronounced [buˈdaːnjɛ]; German: Budaine; Italian: Budagne) is a settlement in the upper Vipava Valley in the Municipality of Ajdovščina in the traditional Inner Carniola region of Slovenia. It is now generally regarded as part of the Slovenian Littoral. It includes the hamlets of Avžlak, Brith, Kodelska Vas, Žgavska Vas, Krašnovska Vas, Severska Vas, Kranjčevska Vas, Pirčevska Vas, Grapa, Žaga, Perovce, Šumljak, and Log.

== Name ==
Budanje was attested in written sources in 1763–87 as Bdanije, Bedanije, and Bedanje. The name is probably derived from the hypocorism Budan; if so, the name is originally a plural demonym meaning 'inhabitants of Budan's village'.

== History ==
Budanje annexed the formerly independent settlement of Severska Vas in 1952.

== Churches ==
There are three churches in Budanje. The parish church in the settlement is dedicated to Saint Nicholas and belongs to the Koper Diocese. A second church belonging to the parish is built on a small hill above the main village and is dedicated to Saint Acacius. A church in the hamlet of Log is dedicated to Our Lady Comforter of the Afflicted and belongs to the Parish of Vipava.

== Notable people ==
Notable people that were born or lived in Budanje include the following:

- Janko Barle (1869–1941), historian, writer, and ethnobotanist
