= Vrtovče =

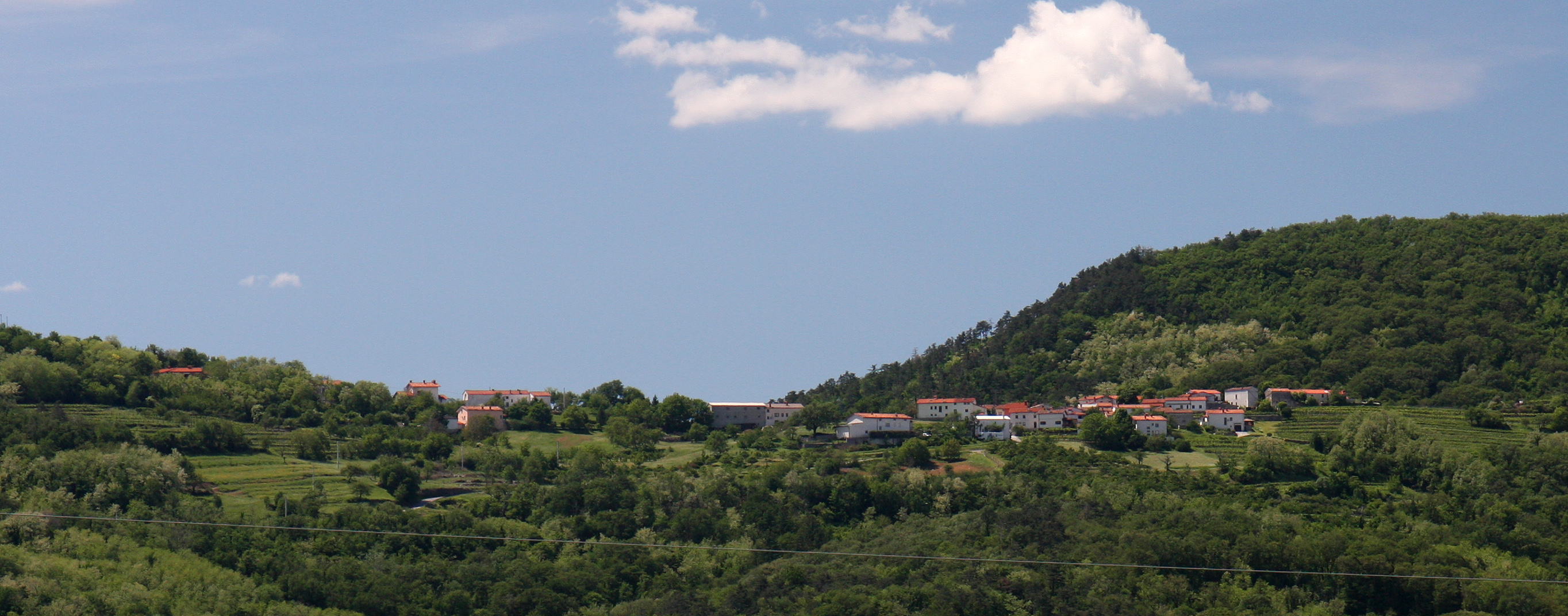

- Location in Slovenia
- Coordinates: 45°51′20.08″N 13°51′34.93″E
- Country: Slovenia
- Traditional region: Littoral
- Statistical region: Gorizia
- Municipality: Ajdovščina

Area
  - Total: 1.81 km^{2} (0.70 sq mi)
- Elevation: 287.9 m (945 ft)

Population (2020)
  - Total: 122
  - Density: 67.4/km^{2} (175/sq mi)

Vrtovče (pronounced [ˈʋəɾtɔu̯tʃɛ]) is a small village in the hills south of the Vipava Valley in the Municipality of Ajdovščina in the Littoral region of Slovenia.

== Geography ==
Vrtovče consists of the main village core and the smaller hamlet of Lisjaki (also known as Lisjaki na Hribu) to the southeast. Nearby elevations include Školj Hill (418 meters or 1,371 feet) to the west, Sharp Peak (Ostri vrh, 422 meters or 1,385 feet) to the southeast, and Tibot Hill (392 meters or 1,286 feet) to the south. Pralo Creek is fed by a spring south of Vrtovče; the site is known as Pri Studencu (literally, 'at the spring'). The name Pralo comes from the verb prati 'to wash' because the clean water of the creek was used for laundering.

== Cultural heritage ==
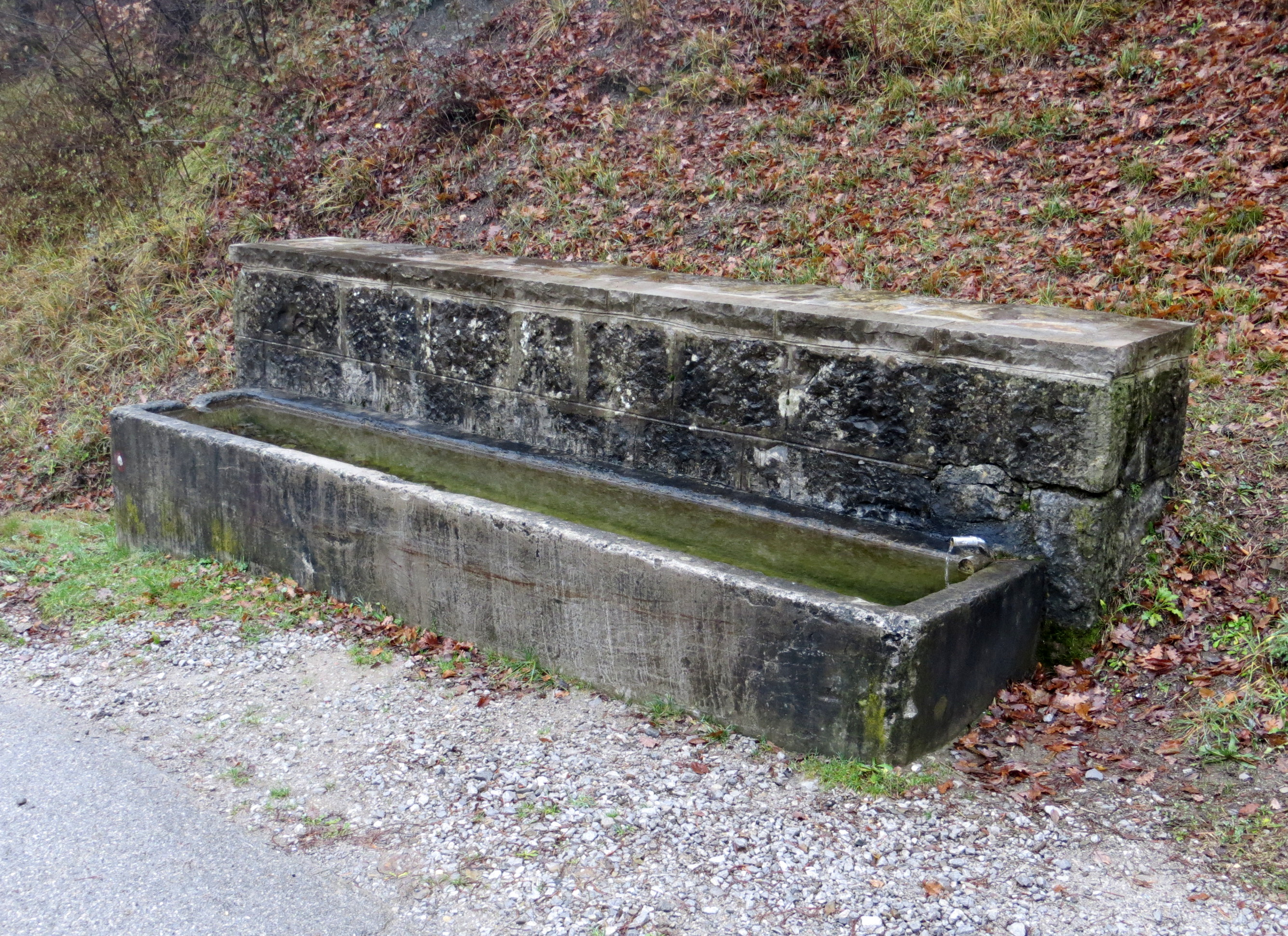
Water trough south of Vrtovče

A reservoir and water trough were built at Pri Studencu in 1903 to supply workers building the section of the Bohinj Railway between Dornberk and Štanjel. Tibot Hill is named after Saint Theobald; there are ruins of a church dedicated to saint on the hill.
