= Selo, Ajdovščina =

Selo
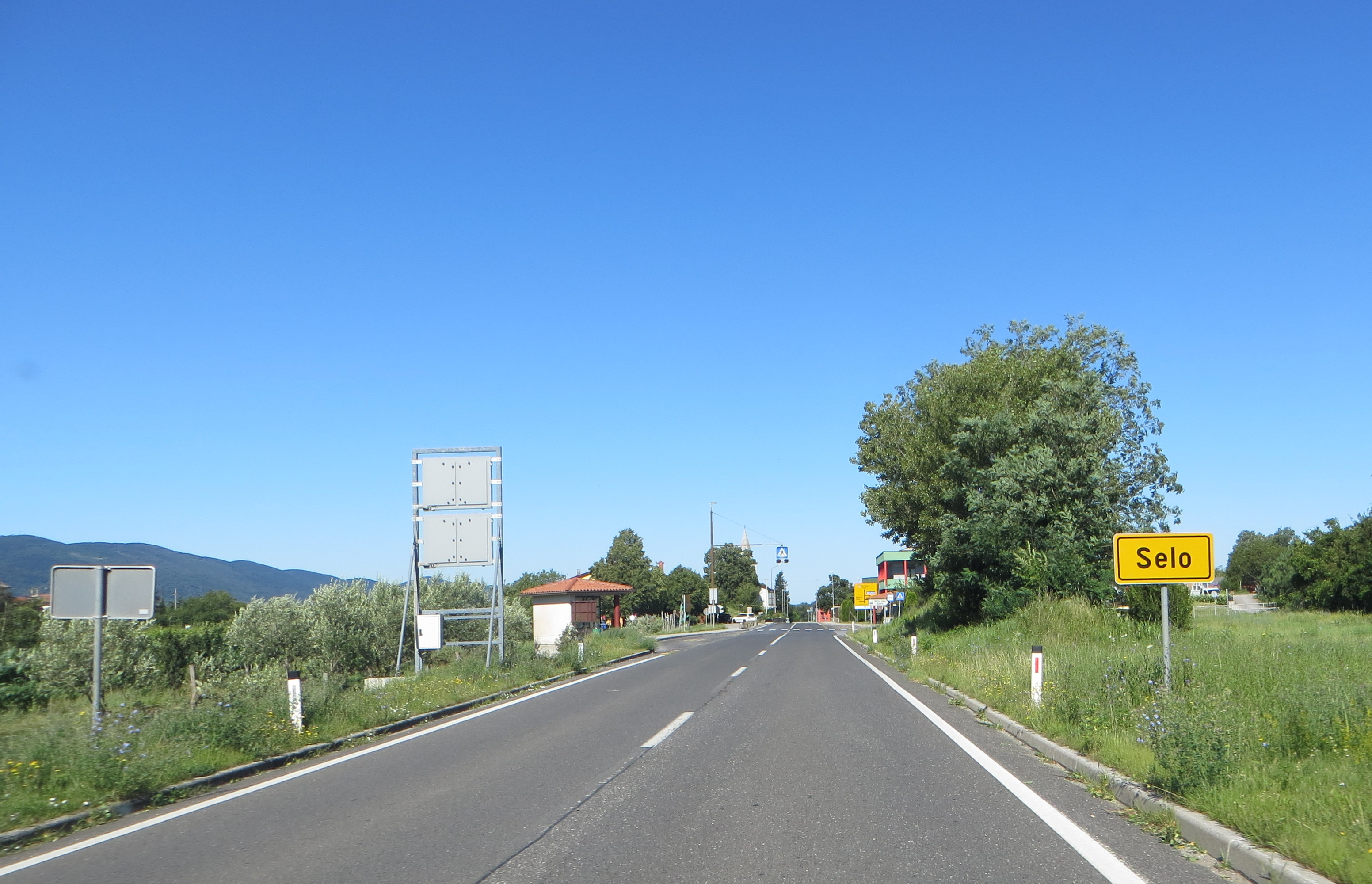

- Location in Slovenia
- Coordinates: 45°53′22.15″N 13°47′17.31″E
- Country: Slovenia
- Traditional region: Littoral
- Statistical region: Gorizia
- Municipality: Ajdovščina

Area
  - Total: 3.98 km^{2} (1.54 sq mi)
- Elevation: 153.3 m (503 ft)

Population (2020)
  - Total: 483
  - Density: 121/km^{2} (314/sq mi)

Selo (pronounced [ˈsɛːlɔ]; Italian: Sella del Bivio Vertovino) is a village in the Vipava Valley in the Municipality of Ajdovščina in the Littoral region of Slovenia.

It is made up of smaller clusters of the hamlets of Britih, Barkula, Mandrija, Na Vasi/Na Gorici, Bauč, Gornji Konc, and Maitov Hrib.

== Church ==
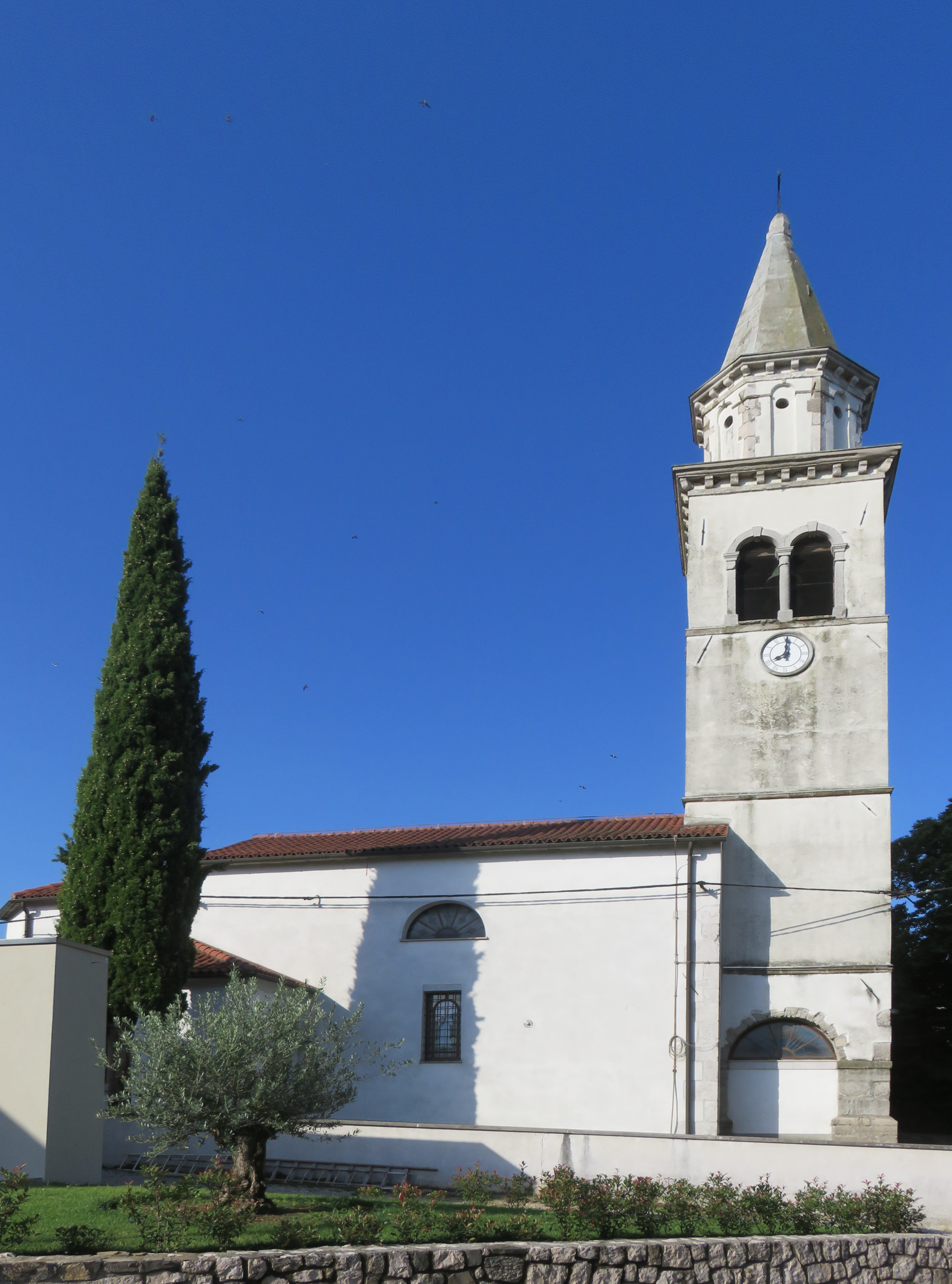
Archangel Michael Church

The local church is dedicated to the Archangel Michael and belongs to the Parish of Batuje.
