= Martin Bauzer =

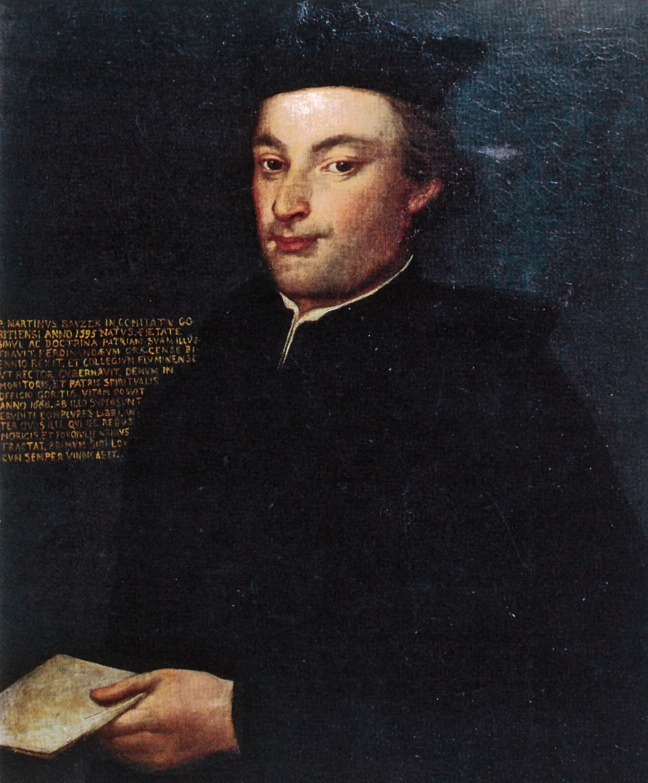

Martin Bauzer (11 November 1595 – 23 December 1668), also known as Martin Bavčer (other spellings: Martin Baučer, Martin Bavčar), was a historian from Gorizia who wrote in Latin.

Bauzer was born in the village of Selo near Ajdovščina in the Vipava Valley, in what was then the County of Gorizia, a part of the Holy Roman Empire (from 1918-1943 the Friuli-Venezia Giulia region of northeastern Italy), now the Ajdovščina municipality in Slovenia. He studied philosophy and graduated from it in the Moravian town of Brno, where he also joined the Jesuit order. He then studied theology before being ordained a Catholic priest.

Bauzer's most important work is The History of Noricum and Friuli (Historia rerum Noricarum et Forojuliensium; 1663), written in Latin in ten books and comprising a period going from the Deluge to the coronation of Frederick III, Holy Roman Emperor. In its original language, it has never been published, but it was published in the Slovene translation in 1975 and in 1991. His other important works include a Chronicle of Contemporary Events and a comprehensive biography of the Counts of Gorizia.

Bauzer died in Gorizia in 1668.

According to the Slovene historian Bogo Grafenauer, Bauzer's descriptions of earlier periods are of little worth, while his accounts of contemporary events are an important source for the history of the 17th century.
