= Grivče =

- Location in Slovenia
- Coordinates: 45°53′38.98″N 13°54′47.86″E
- Country: Slovenia
- Traditional region: Littoral
- Statistical region: Gorizia
- Municipality: Ajdovščina

Area
  - Total: 3.5 km^{2} (1.4 sq mi)
- Elevation: 187 m (614 ft)

Population (2020)
  - Total: 81
  - Density: 23/km^{2} (60/sq mi)

Grivče (pronounced [ˈɡɾiːu̯tʃɛ]) is a settlement on the northern outskirts of Ajdovščina in the Littoral region of Slovenia.
