= Šmarje, Ajdovščina =

Šmarje
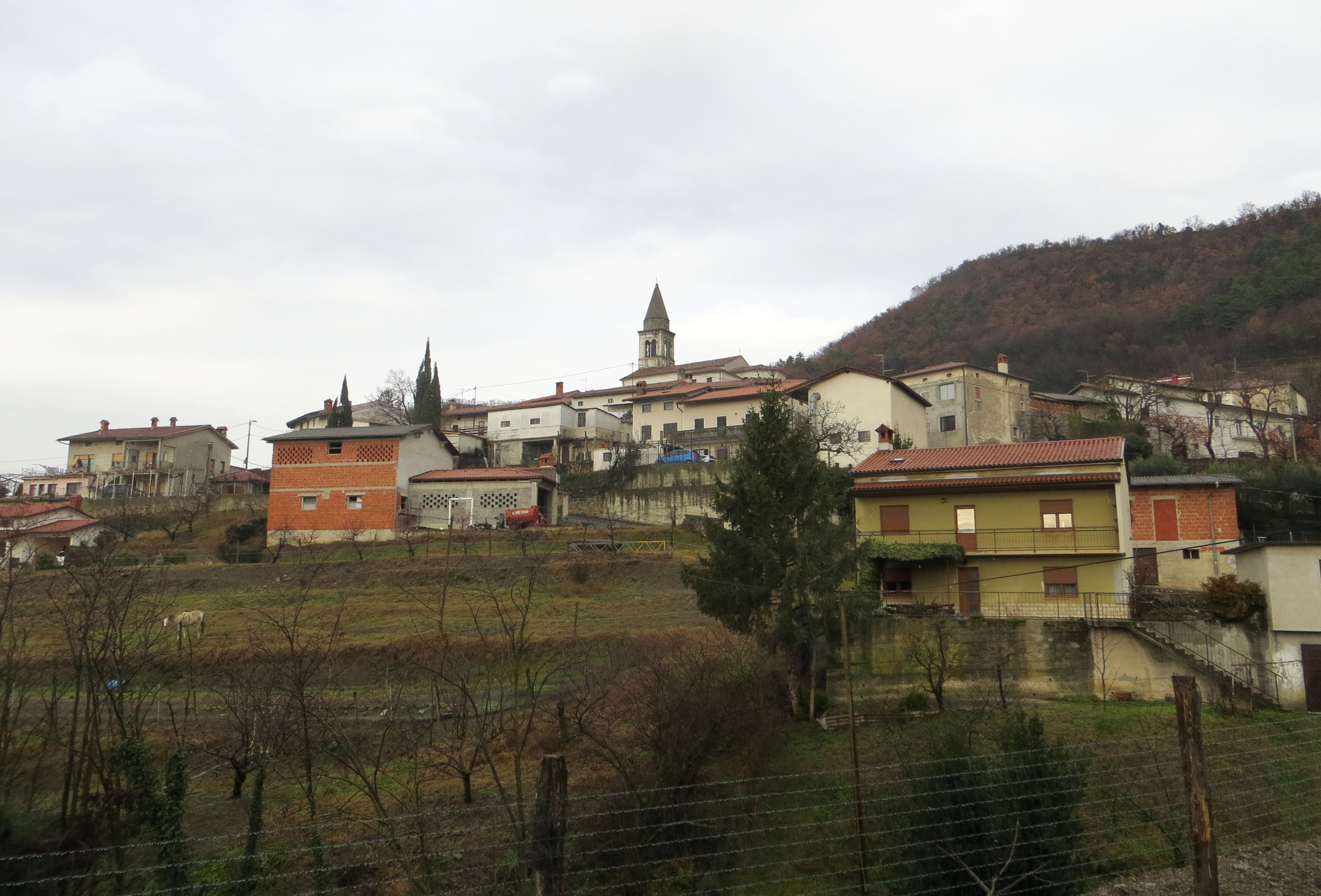

- Location in Slovenia
- Coordinates: 45°50′53.89″N 13°51′6.73″E
- Country: Slovenia
- Traditional region: Littoral
- Statistical region: Gorizia
- Municipality: Ajdovščina

Area
  - Total: 5.81 km^{2} (2.24 sq mi)
- Elevation: 215.3 m (706 ft)

Population (2020)
  - Total: 197
  - Density: 33.9/km^{2} (87.8/sq mi)

Šmarje (pronounced [ˈʃmaːɾjɛ]) is a settlement in the hills southwest of Ajdovščina in the Littoral region of Slovenia. As well as the main village of Šmarje, it includes three smaller hamlets: Potok, Hrastje, and Jakulini.

The parish church, from which the settlement gets its name, is dedicated to the Holy Name of Mary and belongs to the Koper Diocese.
