= Cost of living (disambiguation) =

Cost of living is an economic concept.

Cost of living may also refer to:

== Books ==
- The Cost of Living, a 1999 book by Arundhati Roy
- The Cost of Living: A Working Autobiography, a 2018 book by Deborah Levy
- Cost of Living (play), a 2016 play by Martyna Majok

== Film, television and radio ==
- The Cost of Living (2004 film), a film by DV8
- The Cost of Living (2003 film), a French film
- "Cost of Living" (Star Trek: The Next Generation), a 1992 episode of Star Trek: The Next Generation
- "The Cost of Living" (Lost), a 2006 episode of Lost
- "The Cost of Living" (CSI: NY episode)
- The Cost of Living (radio show), a business/economics news radio show on the CBC Radio One network beginning in 2019.

== Music ==
- The Cost of Living, a 1980s band that included Matthew Caws and Daniel Lorca, who would later form Nada Surf

=== Albums ===
- The Cost of Living (EP), a 1979 EP by the Clash
- Cost of Living (Downtown Boys album) (2017)
- The Cost of Living (The Static Age album)
- Cost of Living (Rick Wakeman album) (1983)
- The Cost of Living (Jason Webley album) (2007)
- Cost of Living, a 2005 album by Delbert McClinton
- The Cost of Living, a song by jazz pianist Don Grolnick, on Michael Brecker's first album Michael Brecker (album)

=== Songs ===
- "Cost of Livin'", a 2011 song by Ronnie Dunn
- "The Cost of Living", a 1966 song by The Downliners Sect

== See also ==
- ACCRA Cost of Living Index, a measure of cost of living differences among urban areas in the United States, published quarterly
- Cost-of-living index, an economic measure of the change in cost of living
