= Batuje =

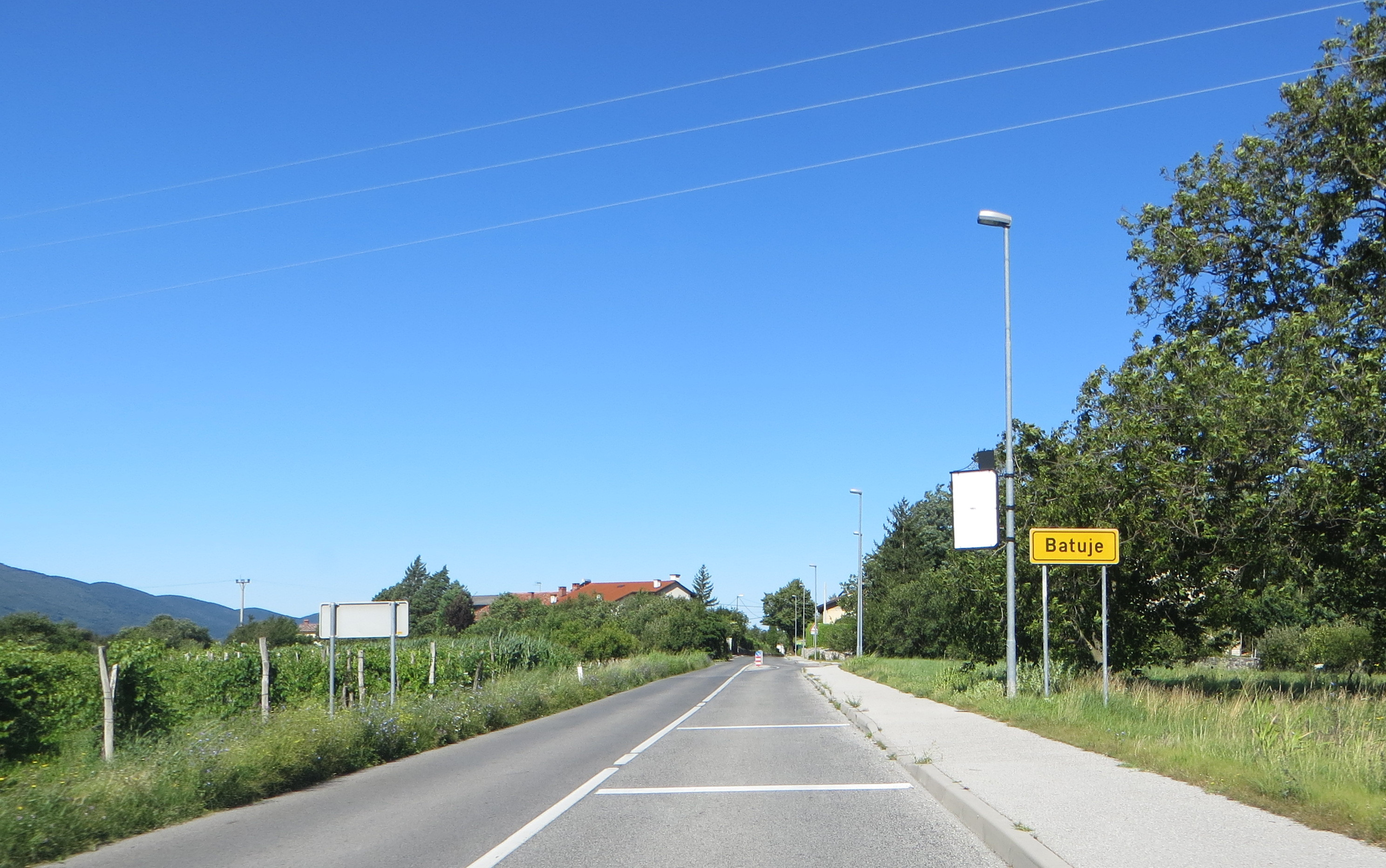

- Location in Slovenia
- Coordinates: 45°53′37.27″N 13°46′37.09″E
- Country: Slovenia
- Traditional region: Littoral
- Statistical region: Gorizia
- Municipality: Ajdovščina

Area
  - Total: 2.82 km^{2} (1.09 sq mi)
- Elevation: 128.1 m (420 ft)

Population (January 1, 2020)
  - Total: 369
  - Density: 131/km^{2} (339/sq mi)
- Climate: Cfa

Batuje (pronounced [baˈtuːjɛ]; Italian: Battùglia) is a settlement in the Vipava Valley in the Municipality of Ajdovščina in the Littoral region of Slovenia.

== Name ==
Batuje was attested in written sources in 1060–83 as Batauia (and as Buttavia after 1086, ze Butinach and ze Wutinach in 1389, and Watuiach in 1523). The name is of pre-Slavic origin, and the earliest attestations indicate that it is based on the Romance name Batavia, which is of unclear origin.

== Church ==
The parish church in the settlement is dedicated to Saint Anne and belongs to the Koper Diocese.
