= Žablje =

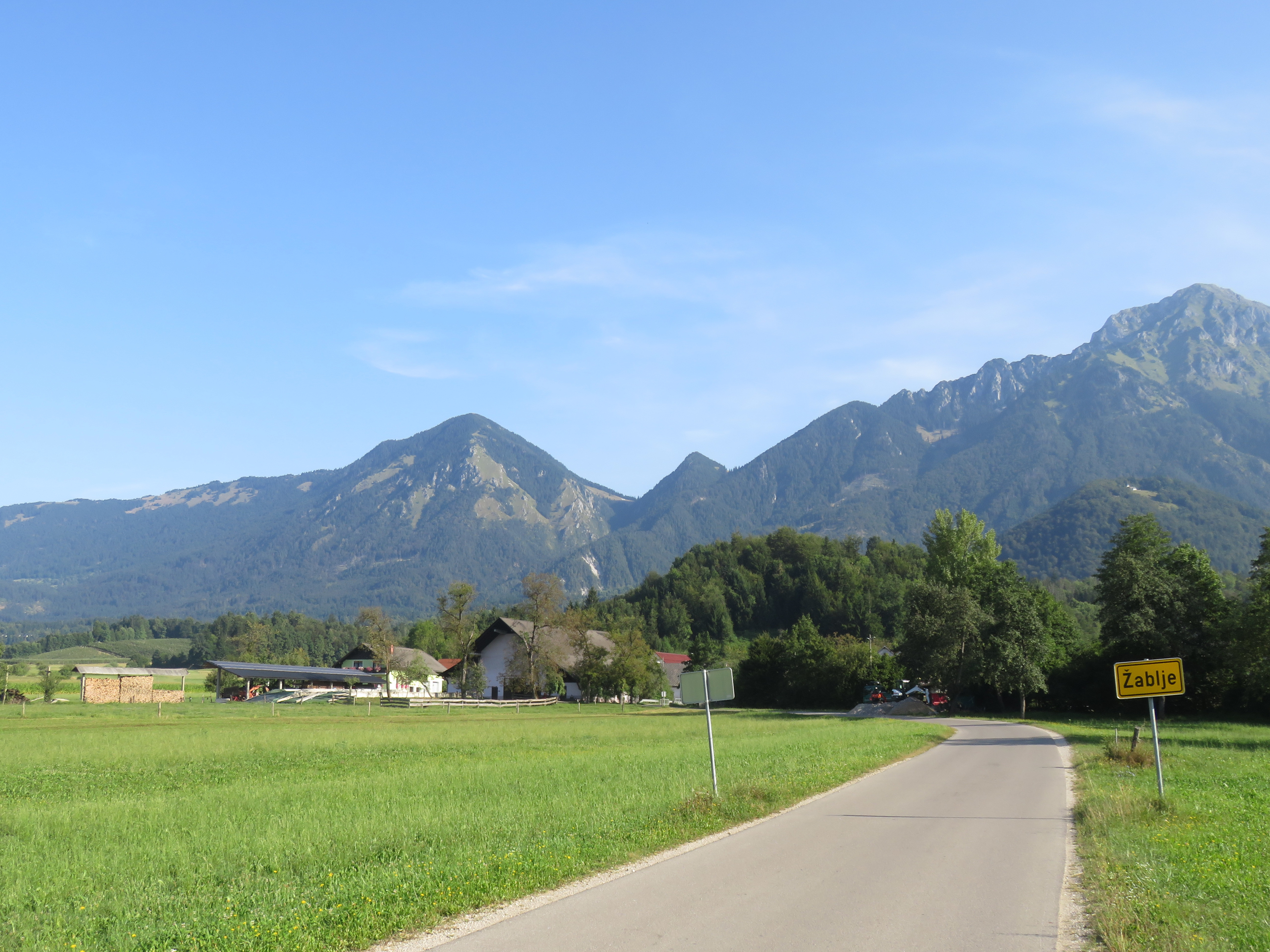

- Location in Slovenia
- Coordinates: 46°18′23.77″N 14°23′3.72″E
- Country: Slovenia
- Traditional region: Upper Carniola
- Statistical region: Upper Carniola
- Municipality: Kranj

Area
  - Total: 0.97 km^{2} (0.37 sq mi)
- Elevation: 466.1 m (1,529 ft)

Population (2002)
  - Total: 32

Žablje (pronounced [ˈʒaːbljɛ]) is a small settlement in the hills north of Kranj in the Upper Carniola region of Slovenia.
