= Kamnje, Ajdovščina =

Kamnje
- Village
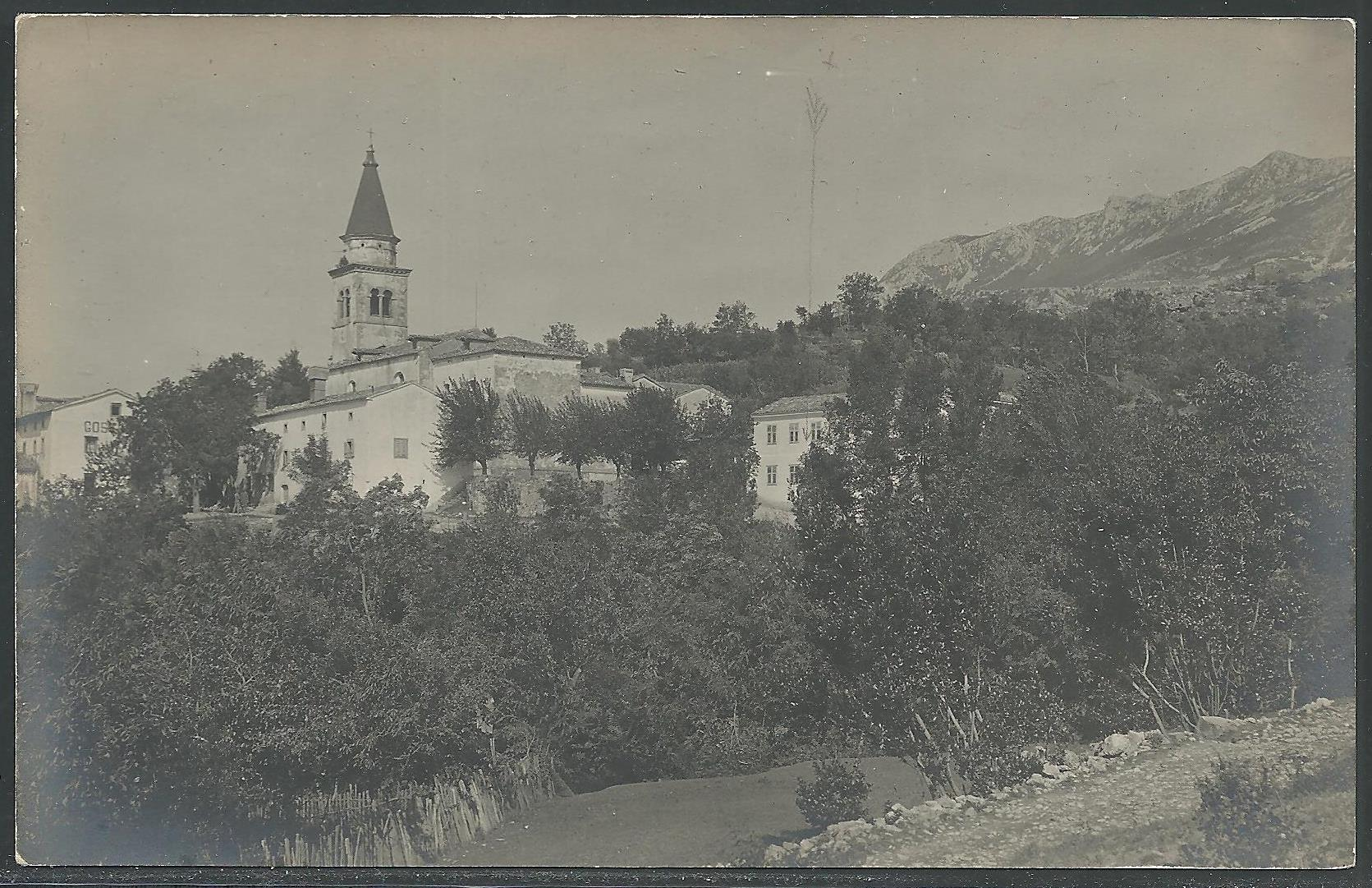
- 1930 postcard of Kamnje

- Location in Slovenia
- Coordinates: 45°53′57.12″N 13°49′51.51″E
- Country: Slovenia
- Traditional region: Littoral
- Statistical region: Gorizia
- Municipality: Ajdovščina

Area
  - Total: 4.41 km^{2} (1.70 sq mi)
- Elevation: 222.5 m (730 ft)

Population (2020)
  - Total: 206

Kamnje (pronounced [ˈkaːmnjɛ]) is a village on the northern edge of the Vipava Valley in the Municipality of Ajdovščina in the Littoral region of Slovenia.

The parish church in the settlement is dedicated to Saint Michael and belongs to the Koper Diocese.
