= Črniče =

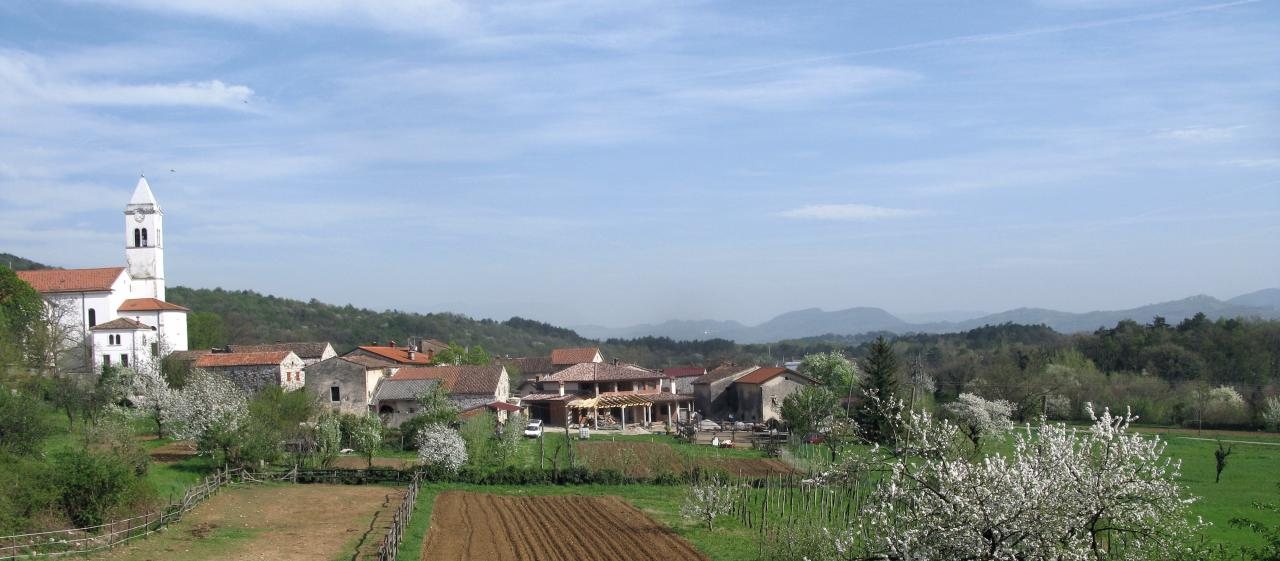

- Location in Slovenia
- Coordinates: 45°54′37.46″N 13°46′31.59″E
- Country: Slovenia
- Traditional region: Littoral
- Statistical region: Gorizia
- Municipality: Ajdovščina

Area
  - Total: 5.35 km^{2} (2.07 sq mi)
- Elevation: 192.8 m (633 ft)

Population (2020)
  - Total: 411

Črniče (pronounced [tʃəɾˈniːtʃɛ]; Italian: Cernizza Goriziana) is a village in the Vipava Valley in the Municipality of Ajdovščina in the Littoral region of Slovenia.

The parish church in the settlement is dedicated to Saint Vitus and belongs to the Koper Diocese.
