= Vipava (river) =

River in Italy and Slovenia

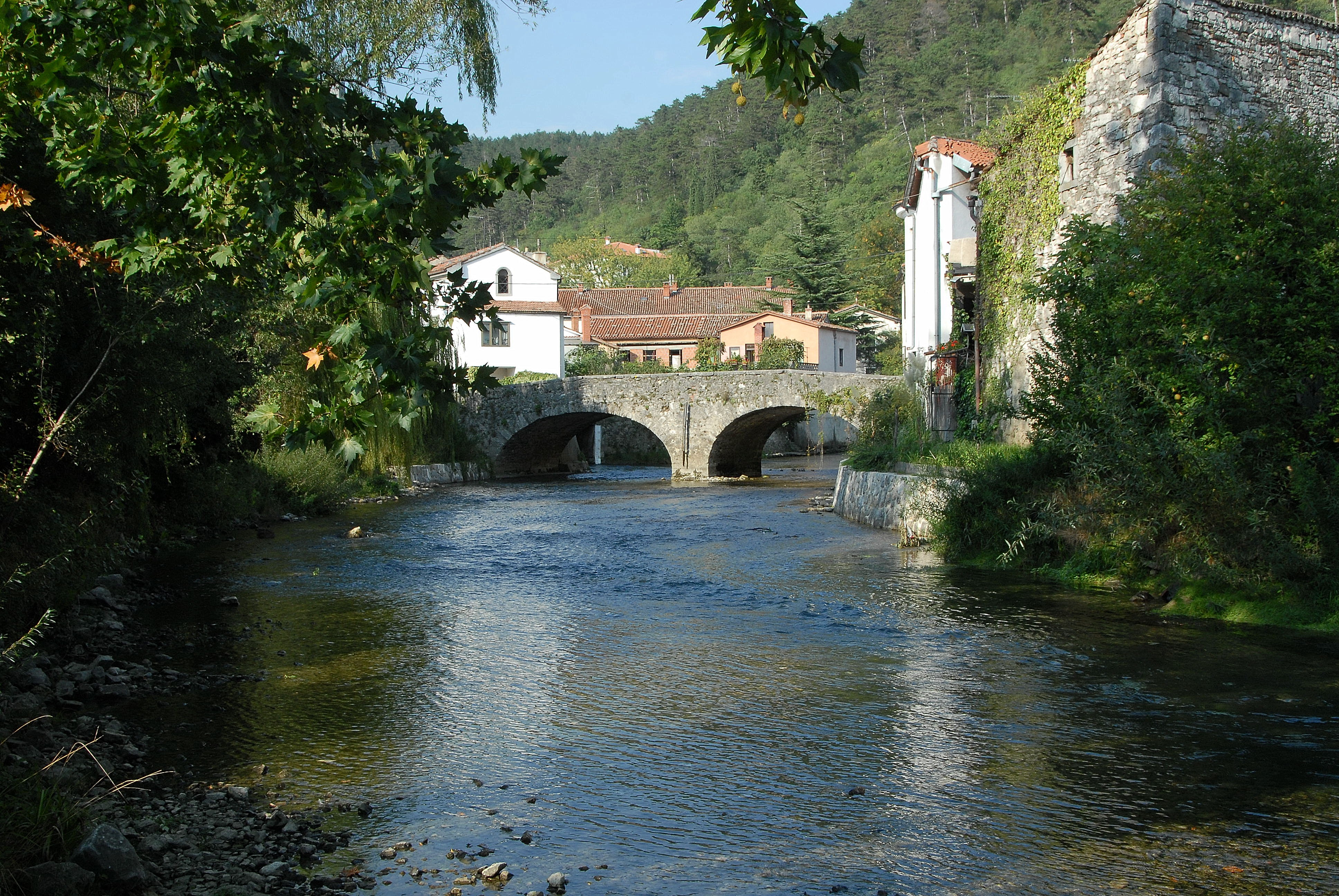
- The Vipava in Vipava, flowing under the Tabor Bridge

Location
- Country: Italy, Slovenia

Physical characteristics
- Source
  - location: Vipava (in Slovenia)
  - elevation: 110 m (360 ft)
- Mouth
  - location: The Soča (in Italy)
  - coordinates: 45.8990°N 13.5533°E
  - elevation: 35 m (115 ft)
- Length: 49 km (30 mi)
- Basin size: 760 km^{2} (290 sq mi)
- Discharge
  - average: 17.31 m^{3} (611 cu ft)

Basin features
- Progression: Soča→ Adriatic Sea

The Vipava (Italian: Vipacco; German: Wipbach or Wippach) is a river that flows through western Slovenia and north-eastern Italy. The river is 49 kilometres (30 mi) in length, of which 45 km in Slovenia. After entering Italy it joins the Isonzo/Soča in the Municipality of Savogna d'Isonzo. This is a rare river with a delta source, formed by nine main springs. The Battle of the Frigidus was fought near the river, which was named Frigidus ('cold') by the Romans. It has a pluvial-nival regime in its upper course and a pluvial regime in its lower course.

== Description ==
Rising from nine karst springs that bubble out of delta-like vents around the town of Vipava, the river threads the fertile Vipava Valley before crossing the Italian border to meet the Soča at Savogna d'Isonzo. The 760 km^{2} catchment is hemmed in by the limestone Trnovo Forest Plateau to the north and the flysch hills of the Karst Rim to the south; both flanks drain invisibly through swallow holes, so the main channel shoulders the valley's entire surface runoff plus substantial karst inflow. Farther downstream the river winds past the towns of Ajdovščina, Dornberk, and Miren, where orchards and vineyards depend on regulated abstractions and on releases from the Vogršček Reservoir. The basin's Mediterranean foothill climate is dominated by the downslope bora wind that scours soils in winter and can gust above 200 km/h, yet the valley still ranks among Slovenia's sunniest areas, averaging more than 2,100 sunshine hours a year. These contrasts—abundant spring water, wind-pruned terraces, and quick routes to the Adriatic—have shaped the valley's history from Roman times (the Battle of the Frigidus, 394 CE) through the Habsburg frontier era to its present cross-border agri-food economy.

== Hydrology ==
Hydrologically, the Vipava shows a mixed pluvial-nival discharge regime: spring snow-melt on the Trnovo Forest Plateau and autumn Atlantic fronts produce twin discharge peaks, while dry summers drop flows below 2 cubic metres per second (m³ s⁻¹) at the Vipava gauge. Long-term mean flow at Miren is 17 m³ s⁻¹, but the channel can swing from a 95-percentile low of 0.9 m³ s⁻¹ to flood crests exceeding 550 m³ s⁻¹, as the 2010 event demonstrated. Hydraulic modelling for the VISFRIM project shows that overtopping hazards concentrate on the meander belt between Dornberk and Miren; proposed countermeasures include new flood walls at Grabec and set-back embankments at Prvačina. At the same time, the BeWater adaptation plan flags chronic low-flow stress driven by irrigation demand, recommending tighter ecological-flow limits, a modernised gauge network and restoration of cutoff meanders to boost habitat quality. Together these studies portray the Vipava as a short, karst-fed river whose hydrology is highly sensitive to both Mediterranean cloudbursts and Balkan droughts—a natural laboratory for water-management experiments at the interface of alpine and Adriatic climates.

== See also ==
- List of rivers of Slovenia
