= Col, Ajdovščina =

Col Podvelb (archaic)
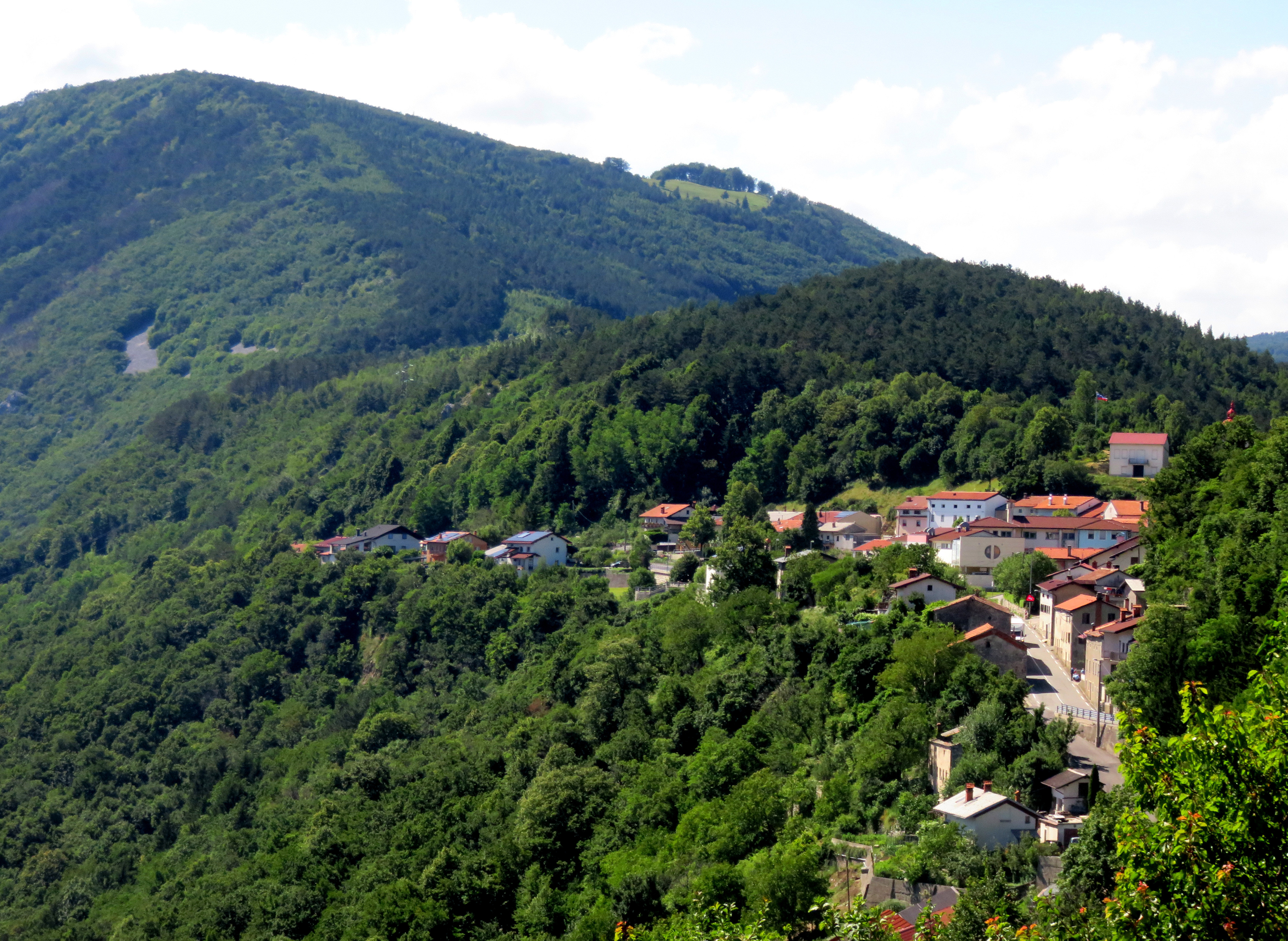

- Location in Slovenia
- Coordinates: 45°52′48.44″N 14°0′7″E
- Country: Slovenia
- Traditional region: Inner Carniola
- Statistical region: Gorizia
- Municipality: Ajdovščina

Area
  - Total: 2.62 km^{2} (1.01 sq mi)
- Elevation: 611.3 m (2,006 ft)

Population (2020)
  - Total: 504

Col (pronounced [ˈtsɔu̯]; archaic Podvelb, Italian: Zolla, German: Zoll) is a settlement on the edge of a karst plateau overlooking the Vipava Valley in the Municipality of Ajdovščina in the traditional Inner Carniola region of Slovenia. It is now generally regarded as part of the Slovenian Littoral. A Roman road led through the settlement. Its location overlooking the valley on the main route leading inland was used in the Middle Ages and later as a checkpoint between the Littoral region and Carniola. Trilek Castle is located on the eastern outskirts of the village.

== Name ==
The settlement was first attested in written sources as Zoll oder Podgweld and Zoll oder Podgwelb in 1763–1787. The Slovene name Col is borrowed from Middle High German zol (modern German Zoll) 'toll' or 'customs duty'. Col is located on the border between the historical Habsburg crown lands of Carniola and Gorizia and was a collection point for tolls. Col was originally known as Podvelb (German: Podgwelb; literally, 'below the arch') in reference to a castle that formerly stood near Saint Leonard's Church.

== Trilek Castle ==
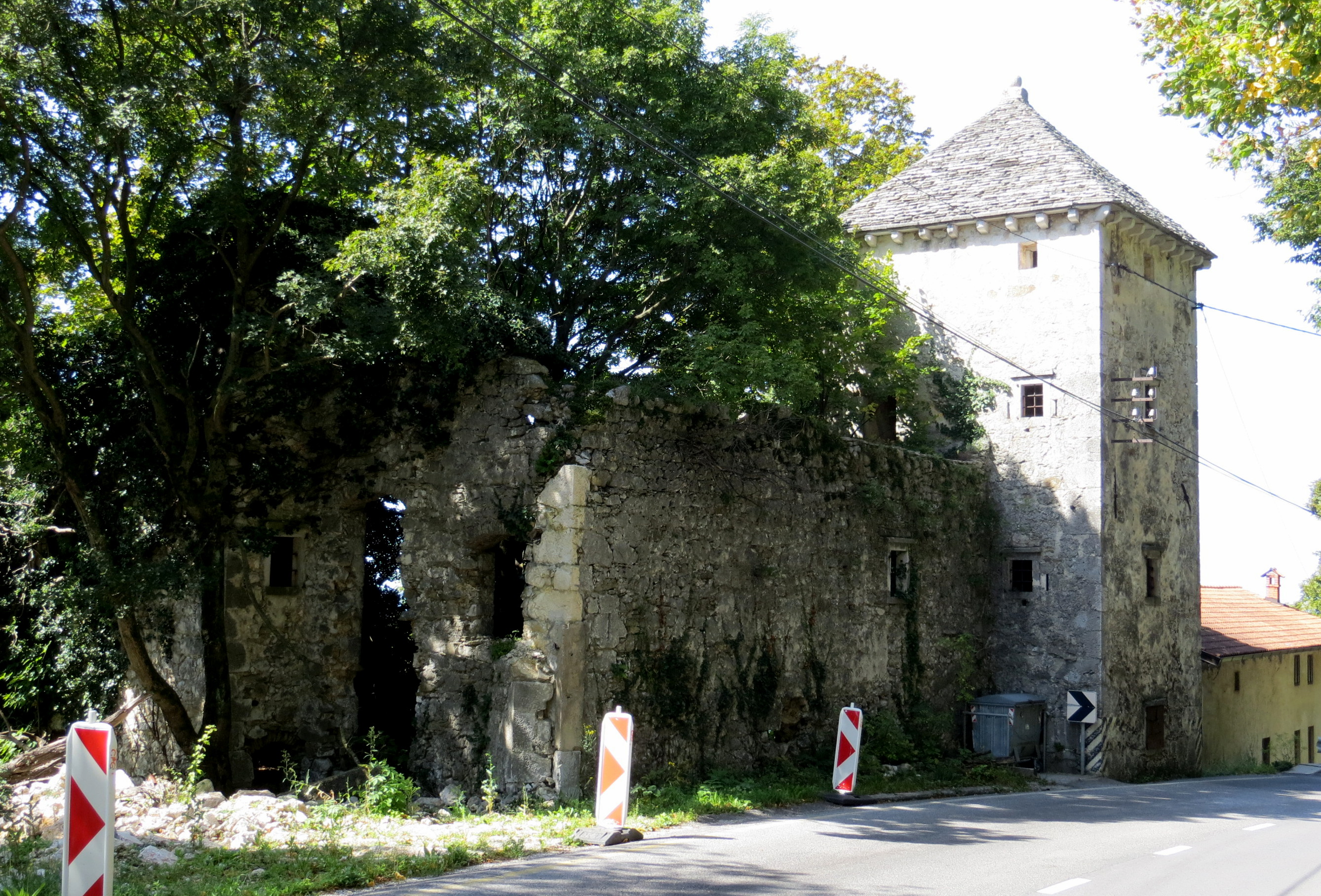
Trilek Castle

Trilek Castle stands west of the center of Col. It was used for defensive purposes against Ottoman attacks, and it was owned by the Abramsberg noble family, resident in Šturje. The castle is now in ruins dating from the 16th century, and only the tower is preserved. Archaeological finds at Trilek Castle include a Roman milestone that was found in the 19th century; it bears a dedication to Julian the Apostate and is held by the National Museum of Slovenia. Roman coins dating from the second century AD have also been found at the castle.

== Church ==
The parish church in the settlement is dedicated to Saint Leonard and belongs to the Diocese of Koper.
