= Hrušica =

Hrušica may refer to a number of places in Slovenia:

- Hrušica, Jesenice, a settlement 3 km west of Jesenice
- Hrušica, Ilirska Bistrica, a village northwest of Podgrad
- Hrušica, Novo Mesto, a settlement in the foothills of the Gorjanci
- Hrušica, a hamlet of Podkraj, Ajdovščina in the Municipality of Ajdovščina
- Hrušica (plateau), a limestone plateau
- Hrušica Peak
