= Gradišče, Ajdovščina =

Gradišče
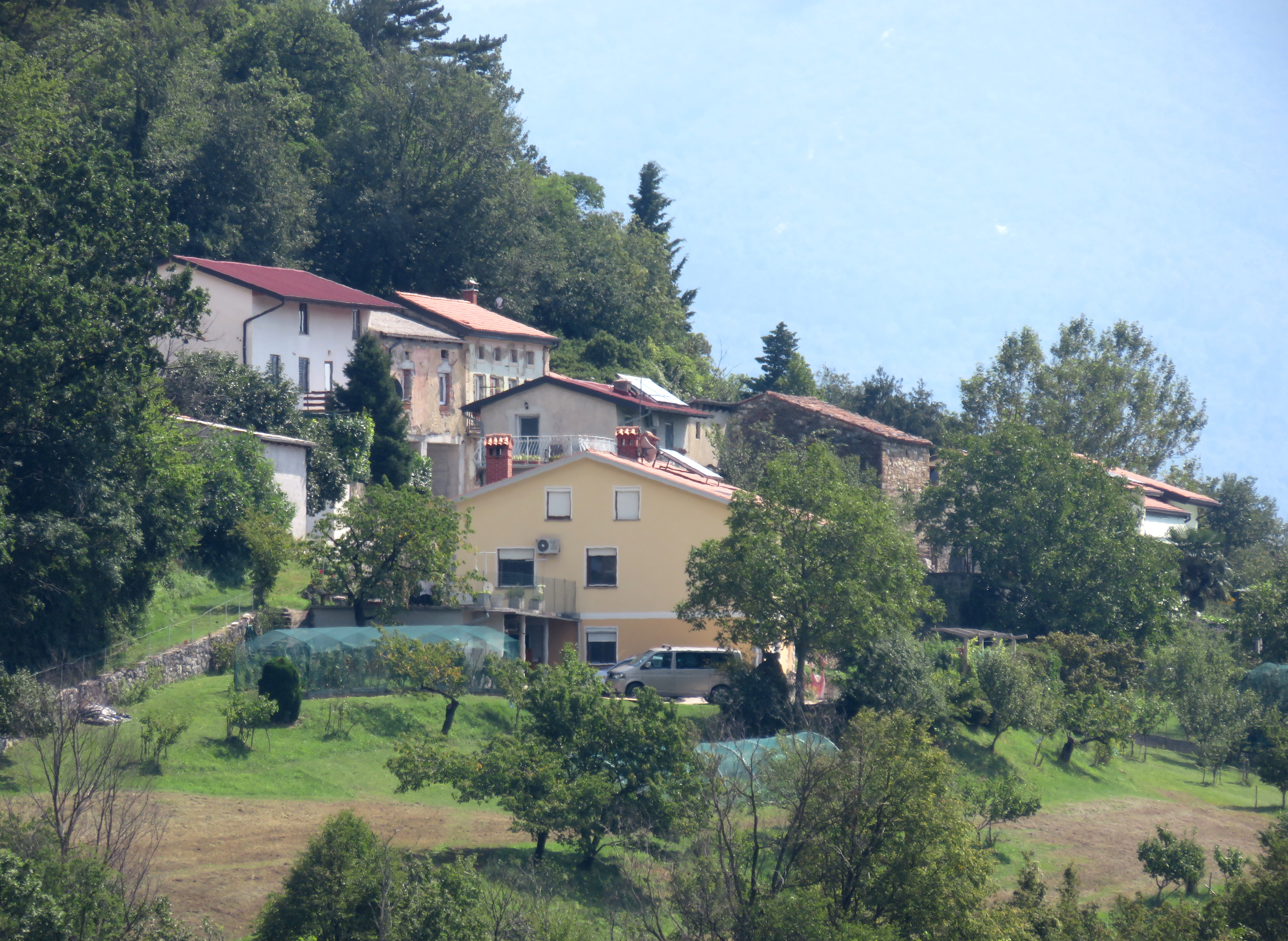

- Location in Slovenia
- Coordinates: 45°53′44″N 13°53′47″E
- Country: Slovenia
- Traditional region: Littoral
- Statistical region: Gorizia
- Municipality: Ajdovščina
- Elevation: 180 m (590 ft)

Gradišče (pronounced [ɡɾaˈdiːʃtʃɛ]; in older sources also Gradiše, Italian: Gradischie) is a formerly independent settlement in the Municipality of Ajdovščina in southwestern Slovenia. It is now part of the town of Ajdovščina. It is part of the traditional region of the Littoral and is now included with the rest of the municipality in the Gorizia Statistical Region.

== Geography ==
Gradišče lies northwest of Ajdovščina, on the southwest slope of Gradišče Commons Hill (Slovene: Gradiška gmajna, elevation: 215 meters or 705 feet).

== Name ==
Gradišče is known locally as Gradiše. The name Gradišče means 'hill fort', referring to an Iron Age fortification at the top of Gradišče Commons Hill. Gradišče is a relatively frequent toponym in Slovenia, referring to locations where such fortifications and similar structures stood. The same sematic motivation is found in related toponyms of Slavic origin: Italian Gradisca d'Isonzo, Romanian Horodiște, Russian Gorodishche, Serbian Gradište, and Ukrainian Horodyshche.

== History ==
Gradišče had a population of 40 people living in seven houses in 1880, 34 in seven houses in 1890, and 33 in seven houses in 1900. Gradišče was annexed by Ajdovščina in 1953, ending its existence as an independent settlement.
