= Postojna Gate =

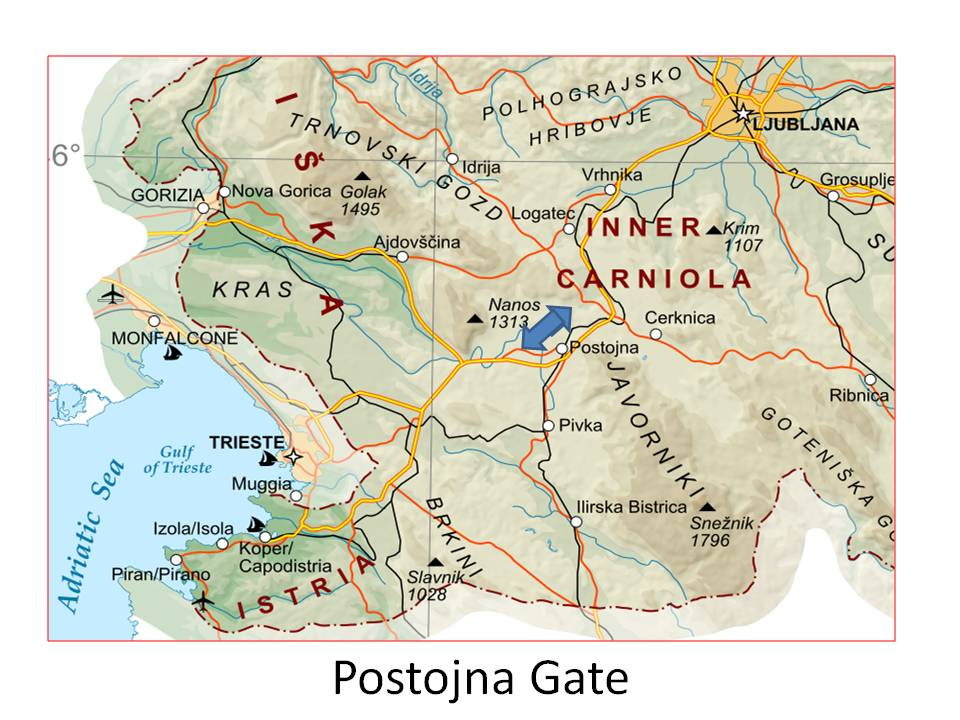

- Location within Alps
- Elevation: 610 metres (2,000 ft)
- Traversed by: Slovenian A1 freeway, Austrian Southern Railway

Third Approach
- Location: Inner Carniola, Slovenia
- Range: Dinaric Alps
- Coordinates: 45°47′N 14°13′E

The Postojna Gate, less often the Postojna Gap (Slovene: Postojnska vrata), named after the local town of Postojna, is a major mountain pass of the Dinaric Alps. It lies in southwestern Slovenia, between the Hrušica Plateau to the north and the Javornik Hills to the south, at an elevation of 610 metres (2,000 ft). It formed due to tectonic subsidence and fluvial erosion by the Pivka River, which in the Pliocene flew superficially in this section. The terrain is significantly karstified. This relatively wide pass enables for the easiest passage from northeastern Italy and northwestern Adriatic Sea to the Pannonian Plain, and had a very important strategic role in the past. Today, a rail line and the Slovenian A1 freeway traverse it.

== History ==
The gate was used by a section of the Amber Road that connected the Baltic lands with the Adriatic. It has been proposed that the voyage of the Argonauts is based on the possibility to travel the Danube, the Sava, and the Ljubljanica rivers upstream, cross the Postojna Gate, and come to the Adriatic Sea downstream on the western side.

It was the central part of the ancient Illyro-Italic (or Italo-Illyrian) Gate between the southeastern Alps and the Kvarner Gulf, connecting northern Italy to the west and the Pannonian Plain to the east. The Romans were well aware that their core territory was threatened by easy access through the Postojna Gate and they created a network of strategic roads, fortifications, and walls, the Claustra Alpium Iuliarum, to stop possible invaders. At the center of these fortifications was the fortress of Castra ad Fluvium Frigidum in the Vipava Valley controlling the Roman road between Aquileia and Emona.

The Illyro-Italic Gate was nonetheless crossed by the Alemanni, the Goths, and the Huns. By about 600, Slavs populated the area and crossed the gate to enter the Istrian peninsula. In the Middle Ages several castles were built in vicinity, including Predjama Castle, Prem Castle, and Sovič Castle.

In modern times, the gap was crossed by the Austrian Southern Railway (Südbahn), the railway that was built between 1839 and 1857 to connect Vienna via Ljubljana to Trieste.

== See also ==
- Ljubljana Gap
