= Lokar =

Lokar may refer to:

- Lokar (surname), a family name
- Lokar, a villain from Space Ghost
- Lokar, a villain from the Power Rangers franchise
- Lokar, a villain from Redakai: Conquer the Kairu
