= Claustra Alpium Iuliarum =

Roman Region

Coordinates: 45°51′49″N 14°6′42″E

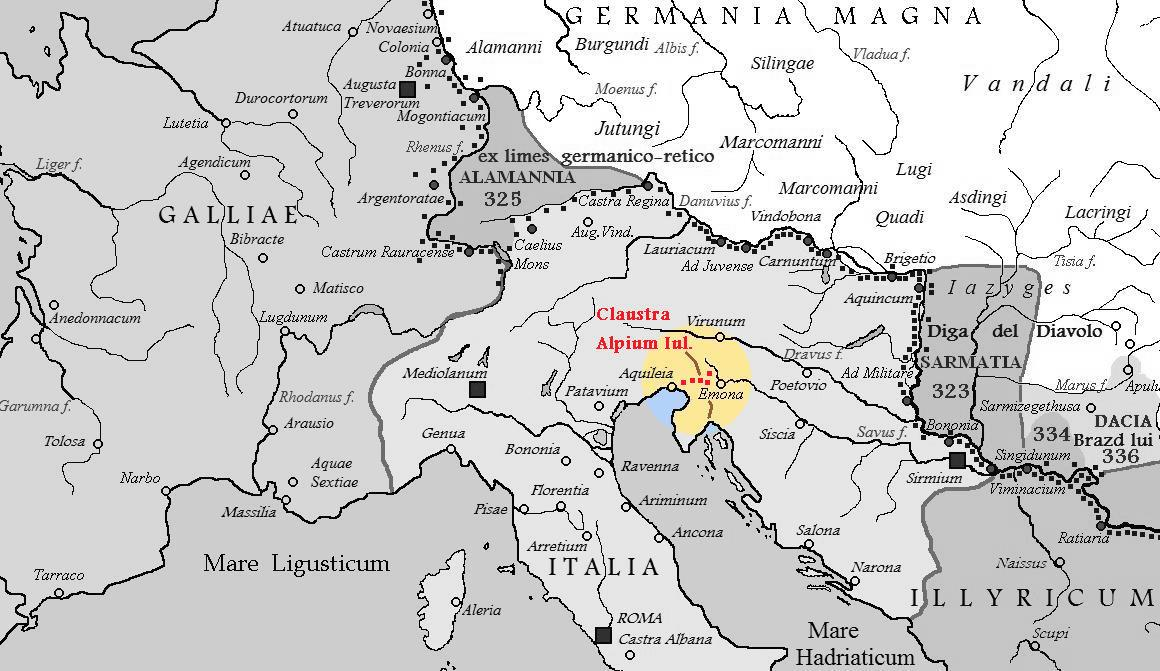
Claustra Alpium Iuliarum highlighted on a map of the Roman Empire

Location of Claustra Alpium Iuliarum outposts with modern national borders of Slovenia and neighbouring countries.

Claustra Alpium Iuliarum (Latin for 'Barrier of the Julian Alps'; hereby, the term Julian Alps refers to the wider mountainous and hilly region from the Julian Alps to the Kvarner Gulf) was a defense system within the Roman Empire between Italia and Pannonia that protected Italy from possible invasions from the East. It secured the Postojna Gate, the land link between the eastern and western part of the empire, and thus the Claustra represented an inner border defense of the empire. Unlike a linear rampart, the Claustra consisted of a series of interconnected fortifications with its center at Castra ad Fluvium Frigidum (in the area of today's town of Ajdovščina, the Vipava Valley); other important fortresses were Ad Pirum on today's Hrušica Plateau and Tarsatica, now a part of the city of Rijeka. They had been governed from the town of Aquileia.

== Development ==
In the year 6 AD the Great Illyrian Revolt took place threatening the Roman heartland. Subsequently, in order to protect Italy, a series of walls and fortifications were gradually erected around the area of the strategic Postojna Gate. Most of the construction was done after 284 under Diocletian and Constantine I. Although this development was done subsequent to a major invasion of Northern Italy by the Alemanni in 271, Whittaker indicates that inner fortification lines were primarily aimed to secure the internal stability of the empire rather than keeping barbarians out. The fortification system included Forum Iulii (in the area of today's Cividale del Friuli), Tarsatica (in the area of today's Rijeka) and followed the valley of the Idrijca river. It stretched over the Postojna Gate to the hills south of Emona (in the area of today's Ljubljana). In-depth fortifications along the Roman road Via Gemina started at the fortress of Castra ad Fluvio Frigido (the remains of which are today still visible in Ajdovščina), which was the centre of the system, and ended at Nauportus (in the area of today's Vrhnika). The hill fortress of Ad Pirum was typically manned with 500 soldiers but could keep up to 100,000 soldiers. Ad Pirum’s walls were unearthed by Austrian and Italian archeologists and shown to be at a height of 8 m and a thickness of 2 m; the wall towers were 10 m high.

== Battles ==
Claustra Alpium Iuliarum saw a number of battles. Early fortifications may have been useful in 169 when the Marcomanni attempted to enter Italy but proved inadequate when the Alemanni invaded Italy in 271. In 351 Constantius II took Ad Pirum during his fight against his challenger Magnentius. Most importantly, the Battle of the Frigidus took place in 394 between Castra and Ad Pirum. In this battle the eastern emperor Theodosius I prevailed over his western rival Eugenius and by his victory secured Christianity as the main religion of the empire.

After the 5th century the Roman fortifications fell into disrepair. Today selected sections have been restored by archeologists.
