= Inner Carniola =

Traditional region of Slovenia

Coordinates: 45°43′00″N 14°25′00″E

Inner Carniola Notranjska
- Traditional region
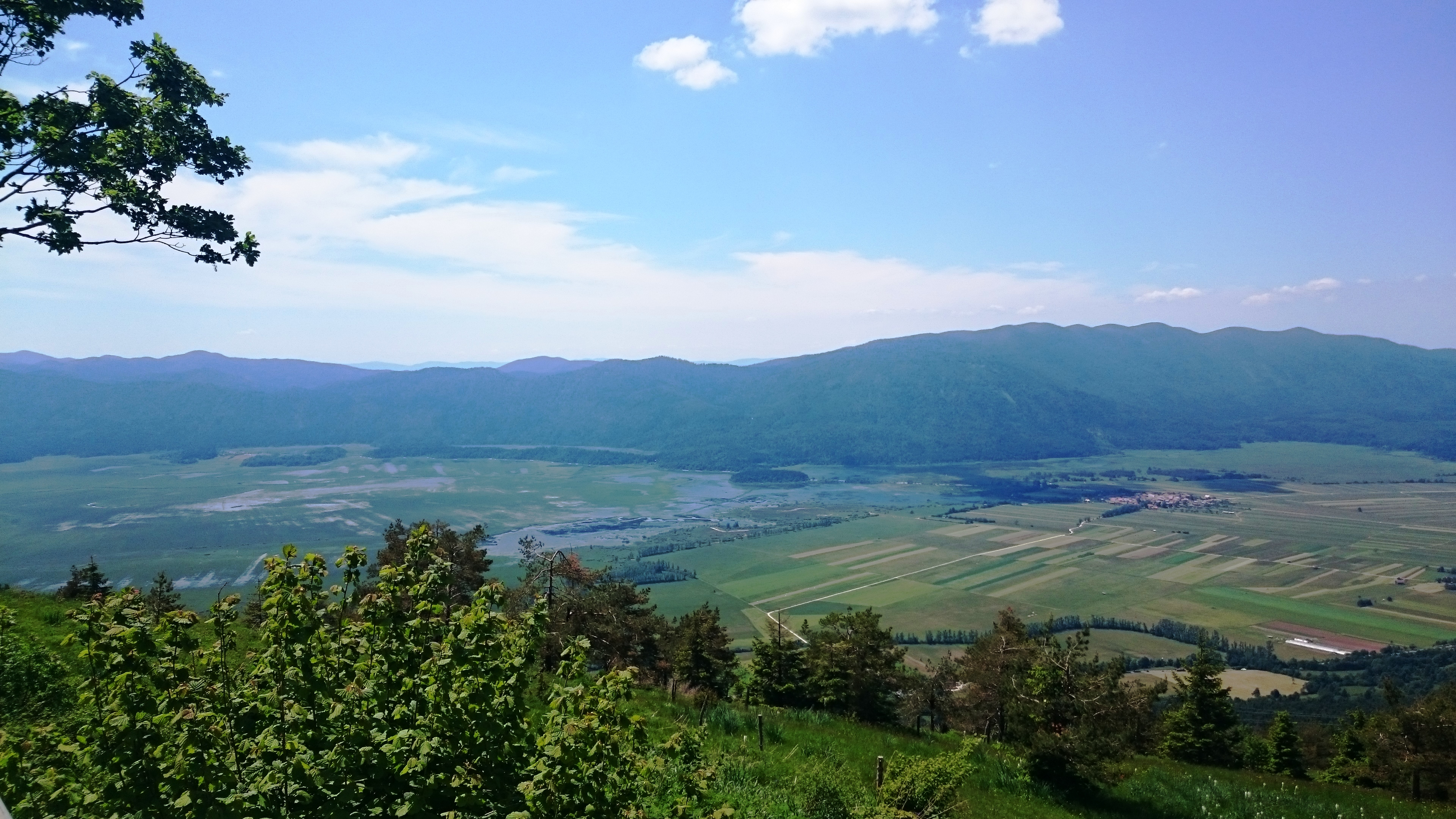
- Typical Inner Carniolan rural landscape at Lake Cerknica
- Interactive map of Inner Carniola
- Country: Slovenia
- Demonym: Inner Carniolan

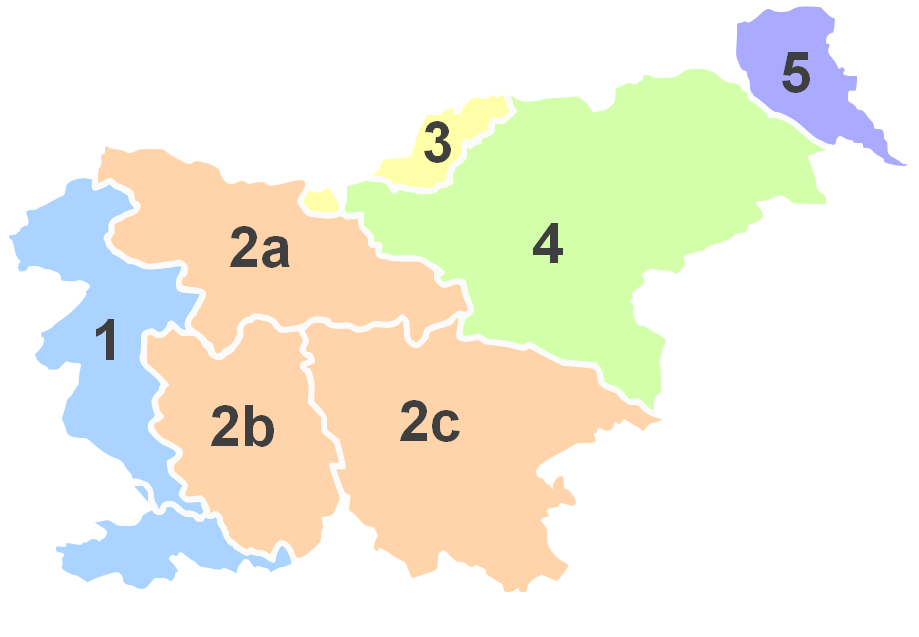
Traditional regions of Slovenia.: 1. Littoral; 2. Carniola: 2a Upper, 2b Inner, 2c Lower; 3. Carinthia; 4. Styria; 5. Prekmurje

Inner Carniola (Slovene: Notranjska pronounced [ˈnòːtɾanska]; German: Innerkrain) is a traditional region of Slovenia, the southwestern part of the larger Carniola region. It comprises the Hrušica karst plateau up to Postojna Gate, bordering the Slovenian Littoral (the Gorizia region) in the west. Its administrative and economic center of the region is Postojna, and other minor centers include Vrhnika, Logatec, Cerknica, Pivka, and Ilirska Bistrica.

== Name ==
The English name Inner Carniola, like the Slovene name Notranjska, is a translation of German Innerkrain, referring to the southwest part of Carniola. The name was created by analogy with Inner Austria (German: Innerösterreich), referring to the southwestern Habsburg hereditary lands.

== History ==
Inner Carniola or Postojna District, late 18th-century map

Inner Carniola was a kreis of the Duchy of Carniola, ruled by the archducal House of Habsburg within the Inner Austrian lands starting in the 14th century. The territorial arrangement was described by the scholar Johann Weikhard von Valvasor (1641–1693) in his 1689 work The Glory of the Duchy of Carniola. Part of the Napoleonic Illyrian Provinces from 1809, Carniola returned to the Austrian Empire by the 1814 Treaty of Paris. First administrated within the Austrian Kingdom of Illyria, the Carniolan duchy again became a Habsburg crown land from 1849 until 1919.

=== Part of Italy ===
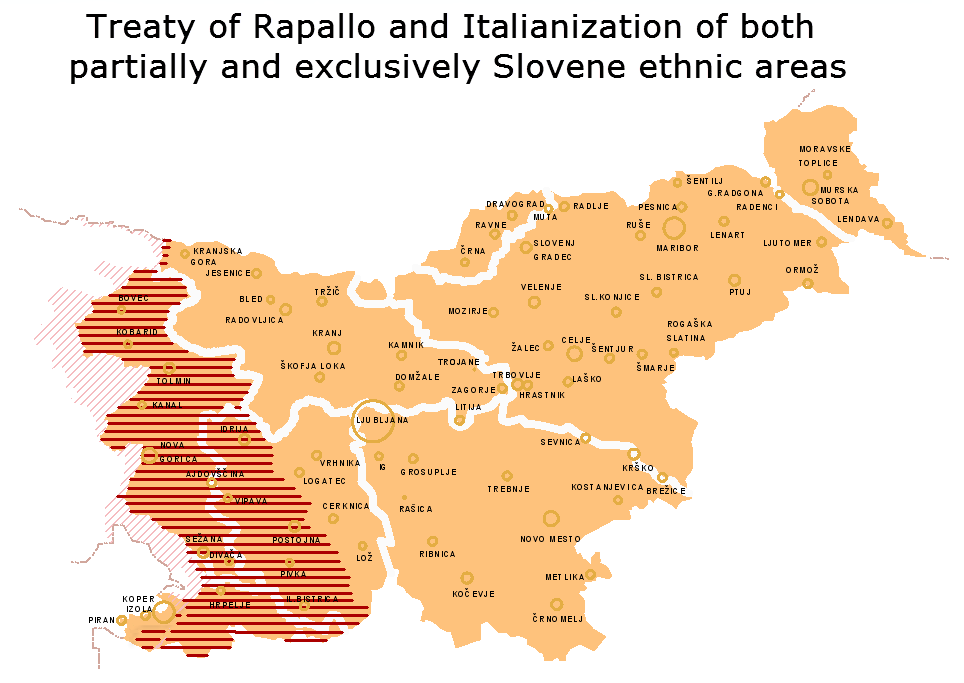
The annexed western quarter of Slovene ethnic territory, and approximately 327,000 out of the total population of 1.3 million Slovenes, were subjected to forced Fascist Italianization. On the map of present-day Slovenia with its traditional regions' boundaries.

After World War I, the western part of the region was occupied by the Italian military. In 1920, the Treaty of Rapallo transferred the western part of the region (with around two-thirds of the population) to the Kingdom of Italy. The eastern third was included into the Kingdom of Serbs, Croats and Slovenes (later renamed Yugoslavia).

Italy was given the districts of Vipava, Postojna, Ilirska Bistrica, Senožeče, and Idrija. The region was divided among the provinces of Gorizia, Trieste, and Fiume (Rijeka). With the rise of Fascism, it was subjected to a policy of violent Italianization until the downfall of Fascism in Italy. In 1947, it was transferred to Yugoslavia, which had occupied it since 1945.

An effect of the nearly three decades of Italian administration of the area is that the western part of Inner Carniola is now popularly perceived as being part of the Littoral.

== Images ==
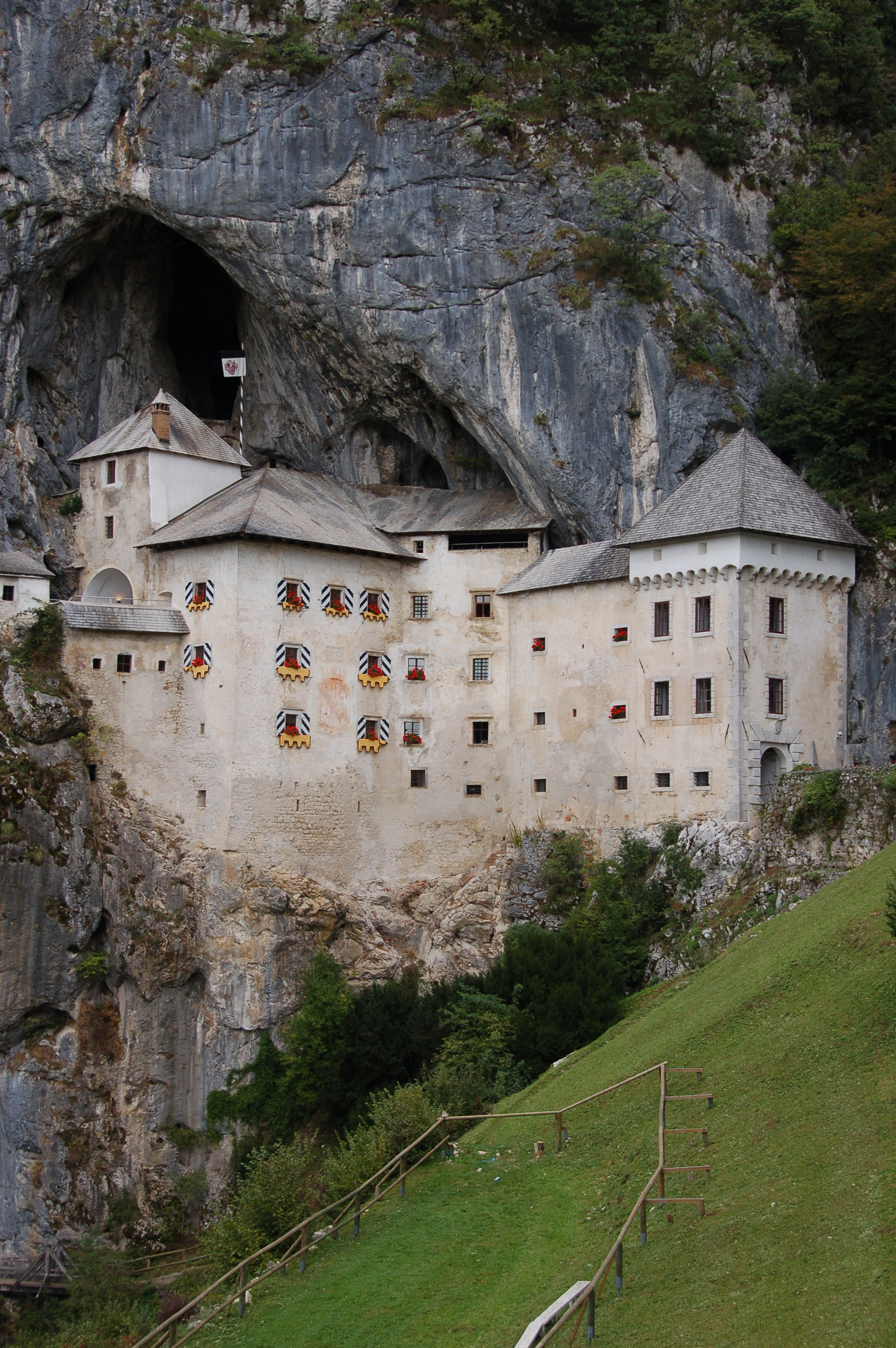
Predjama Castle

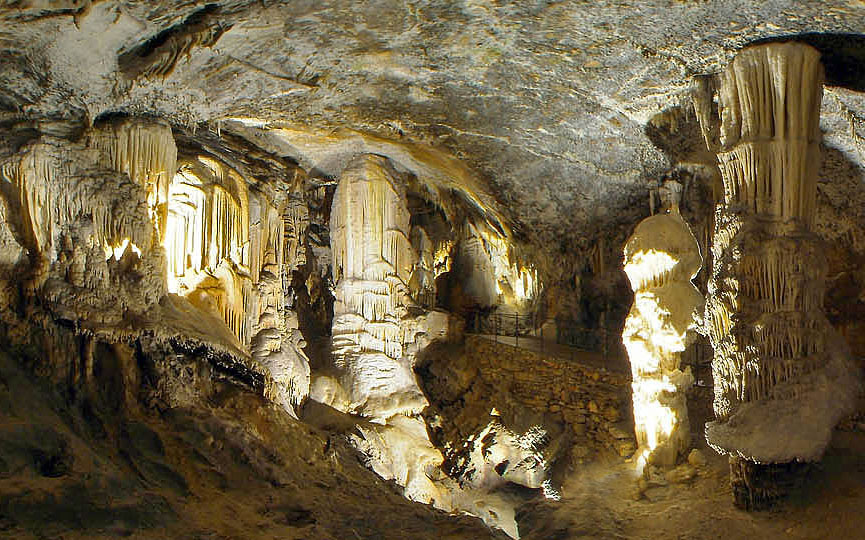
Postojna Cave

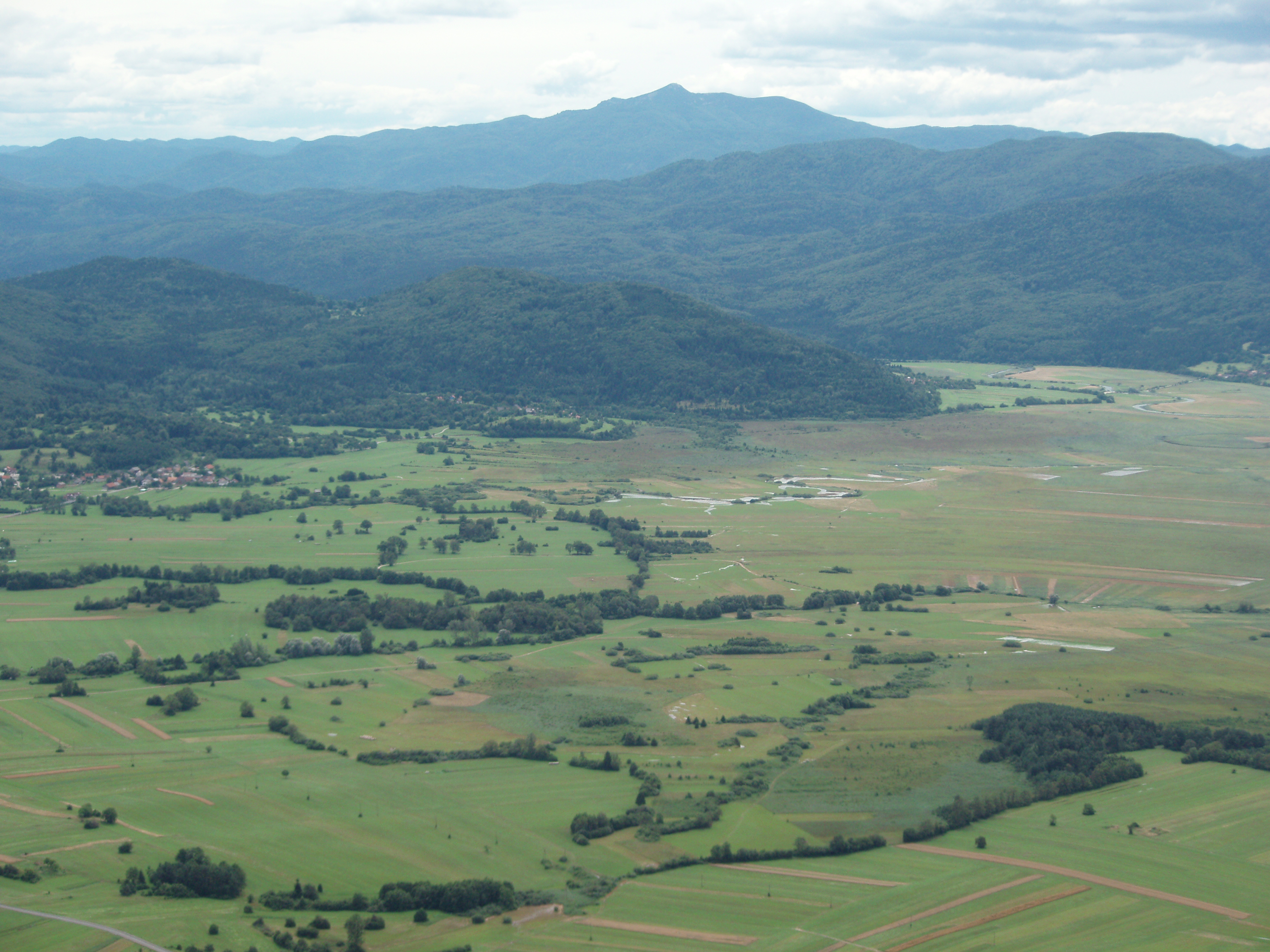
Lake Cerknica

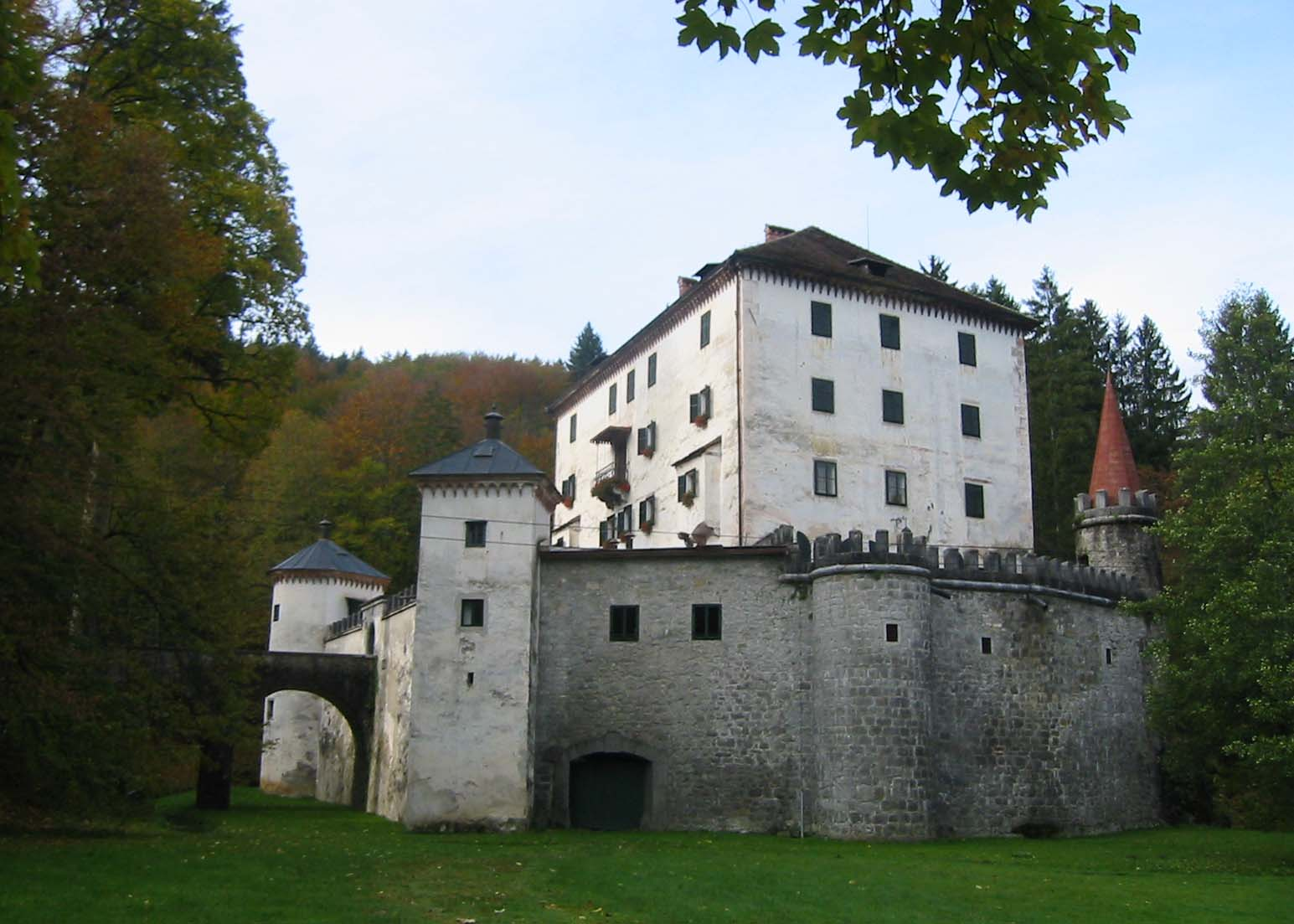
Snežnik Castle

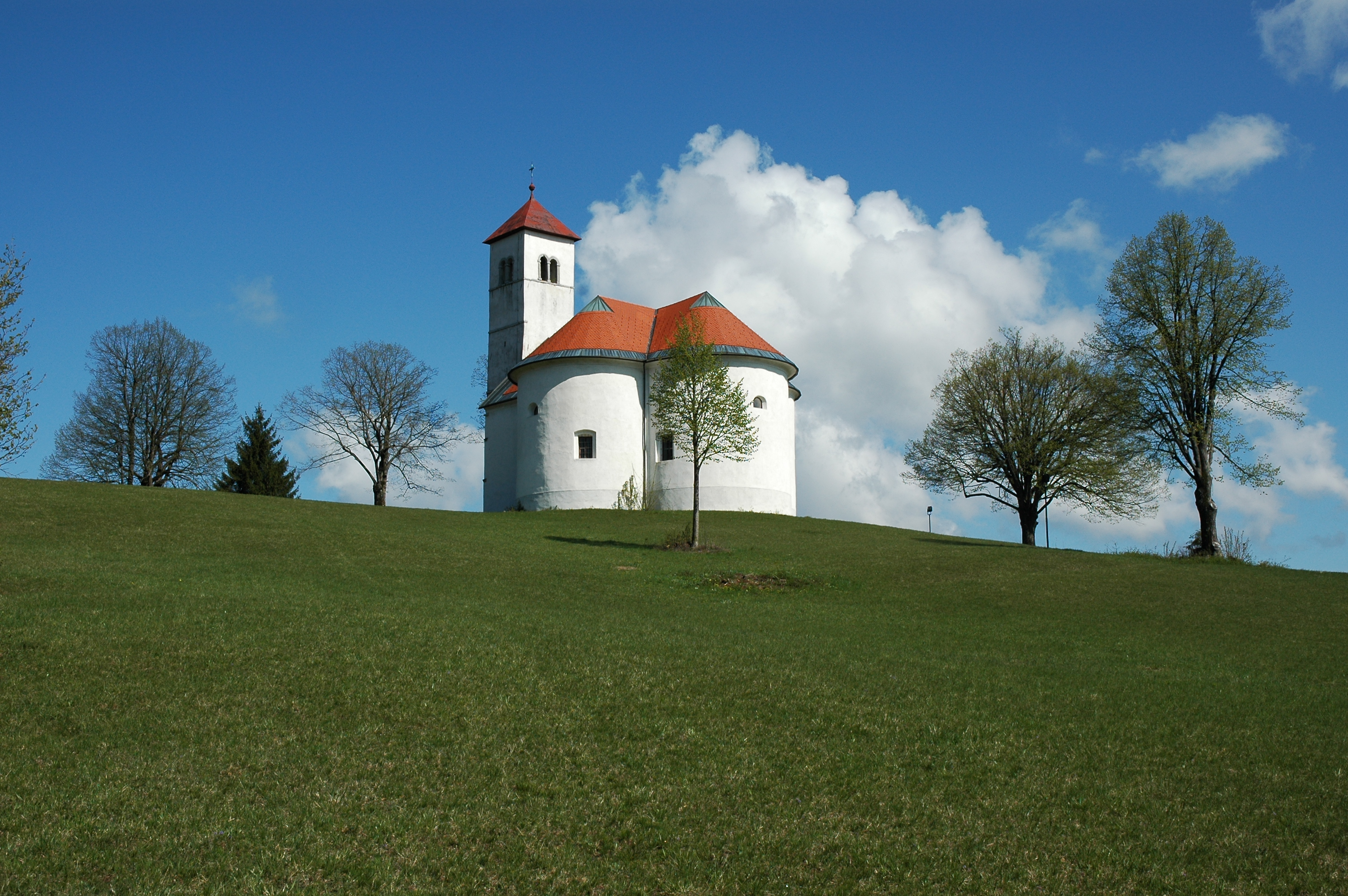
St. Wolfgang's Church in Zelše

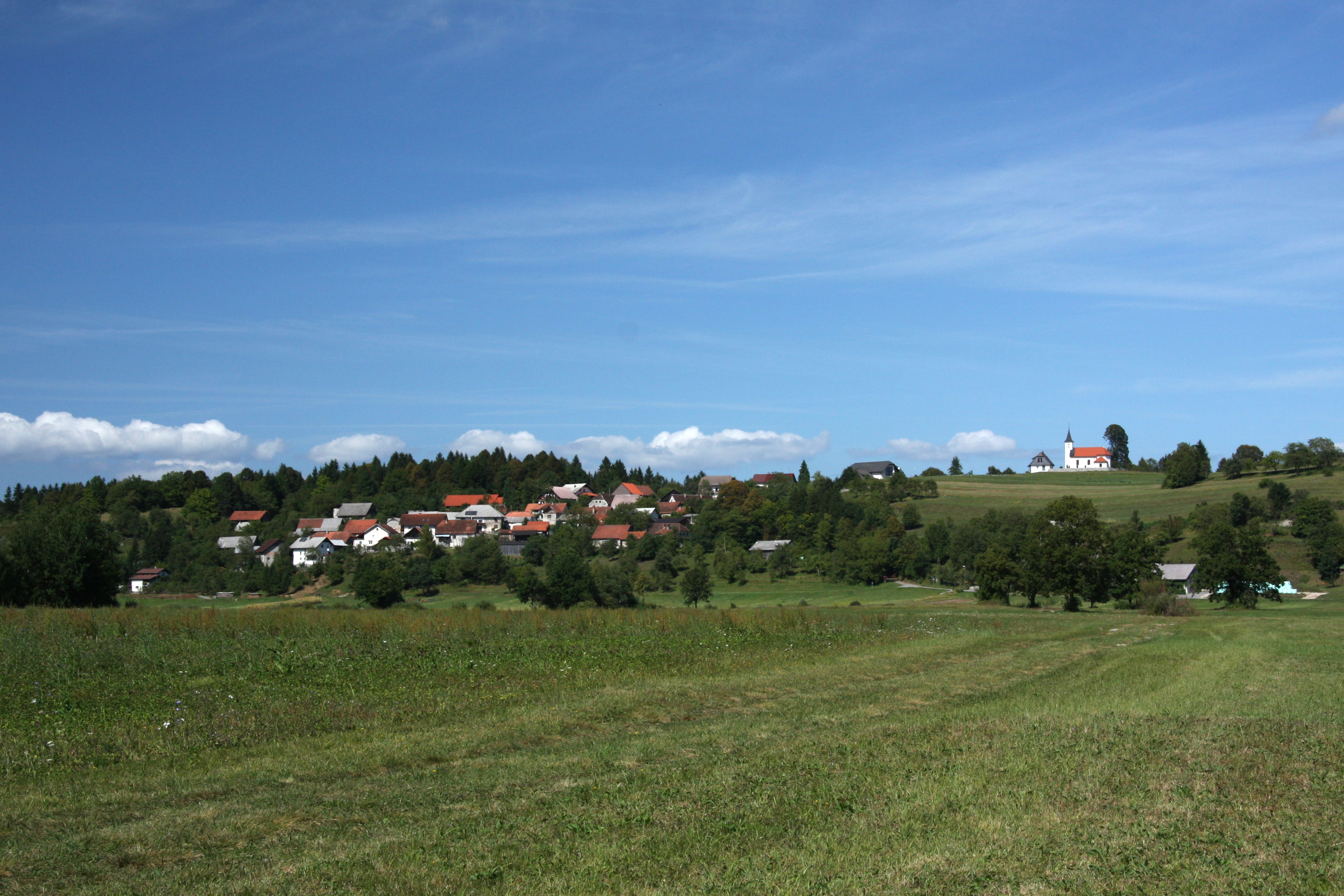
Rural landscape near Planina

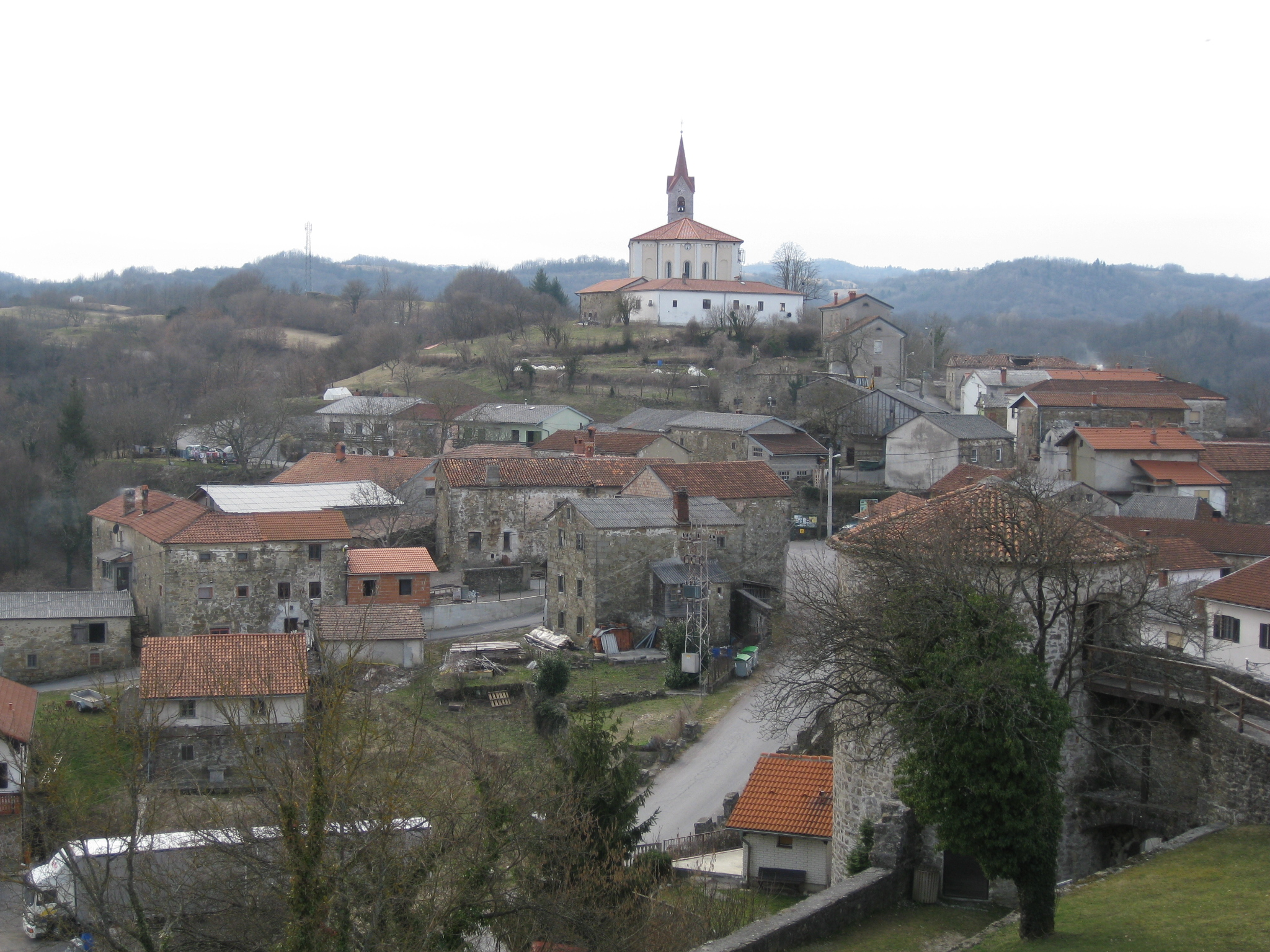
Village of Prem
