= Ajdovščina =

- Town
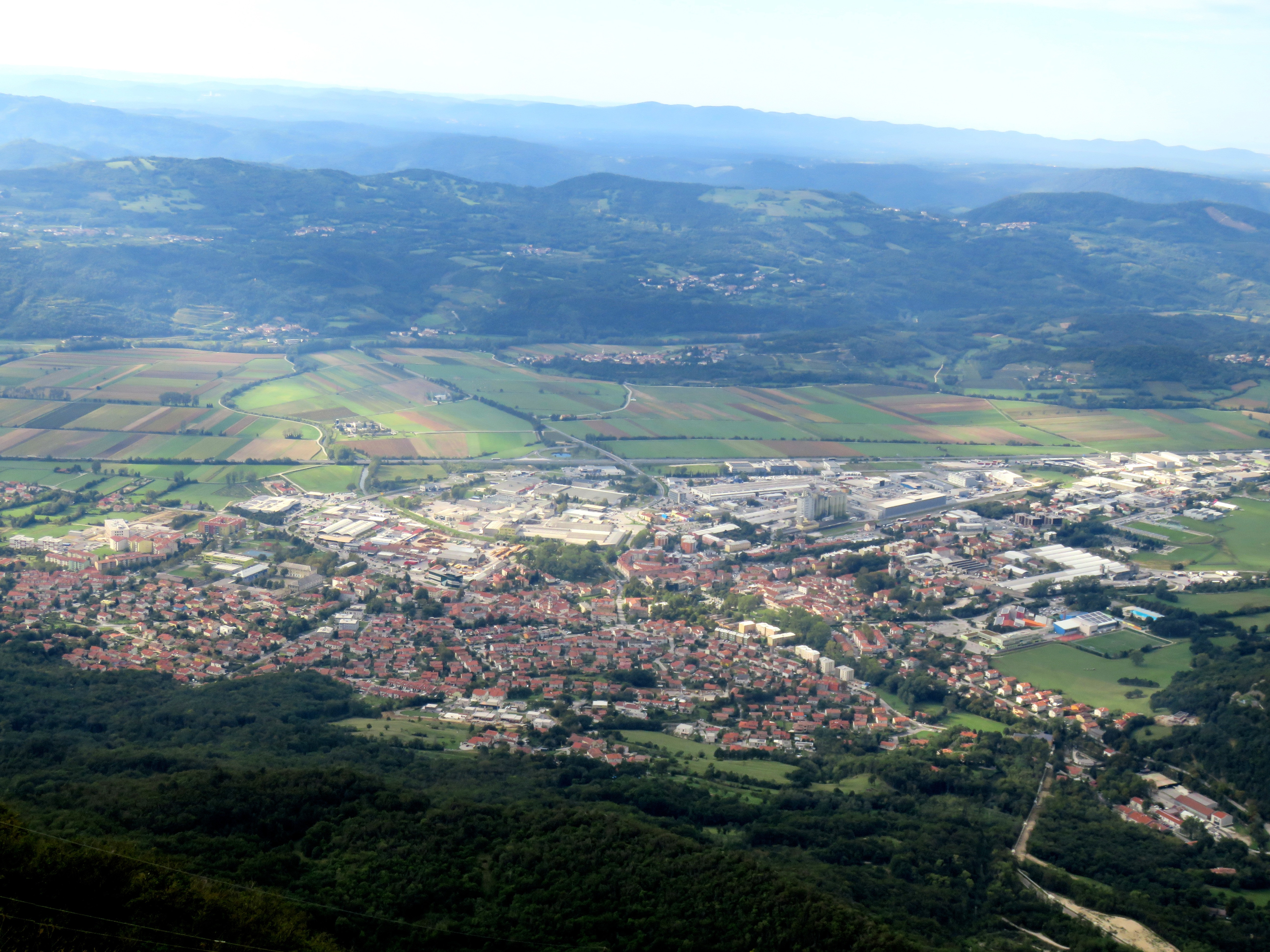
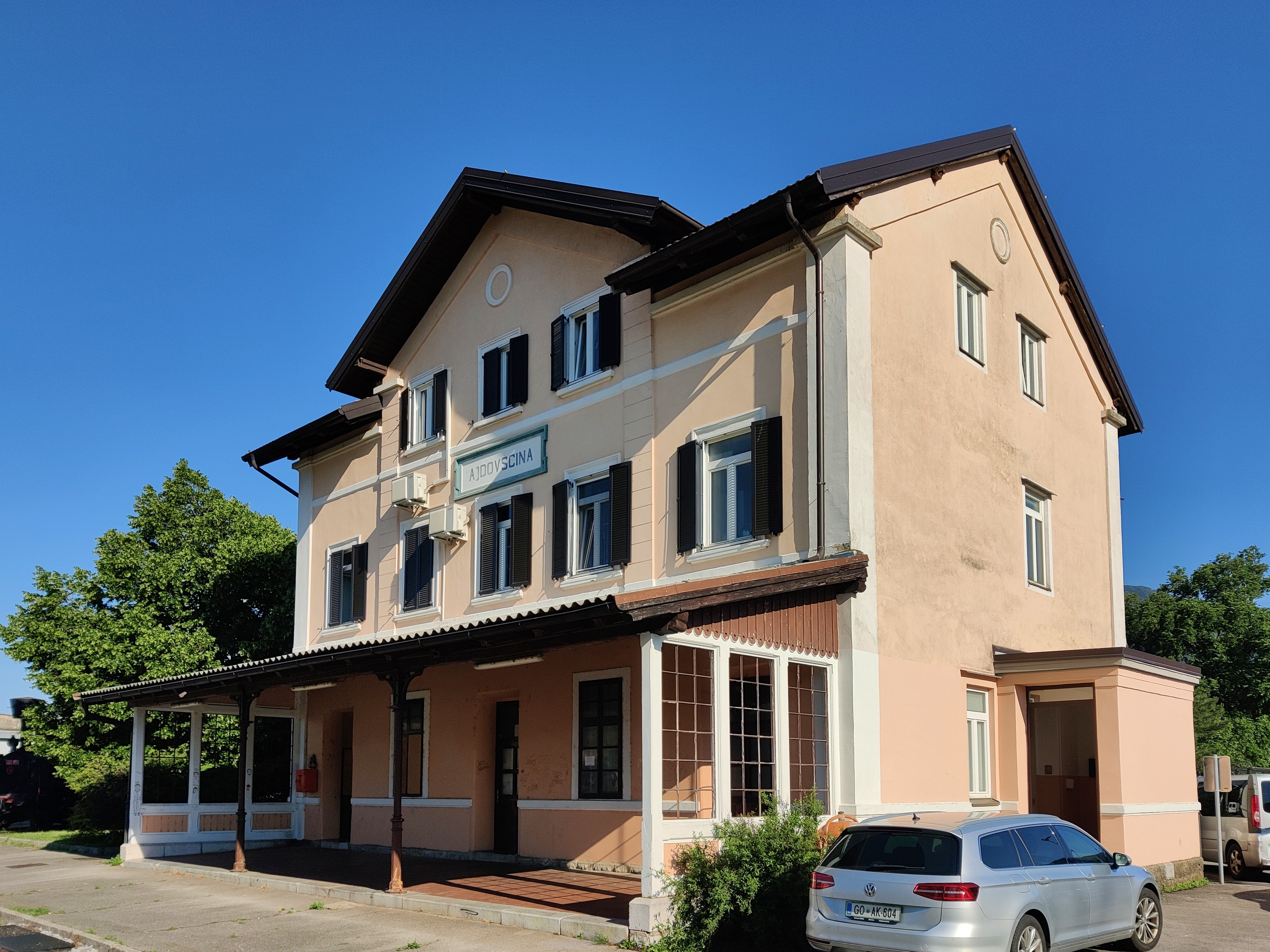
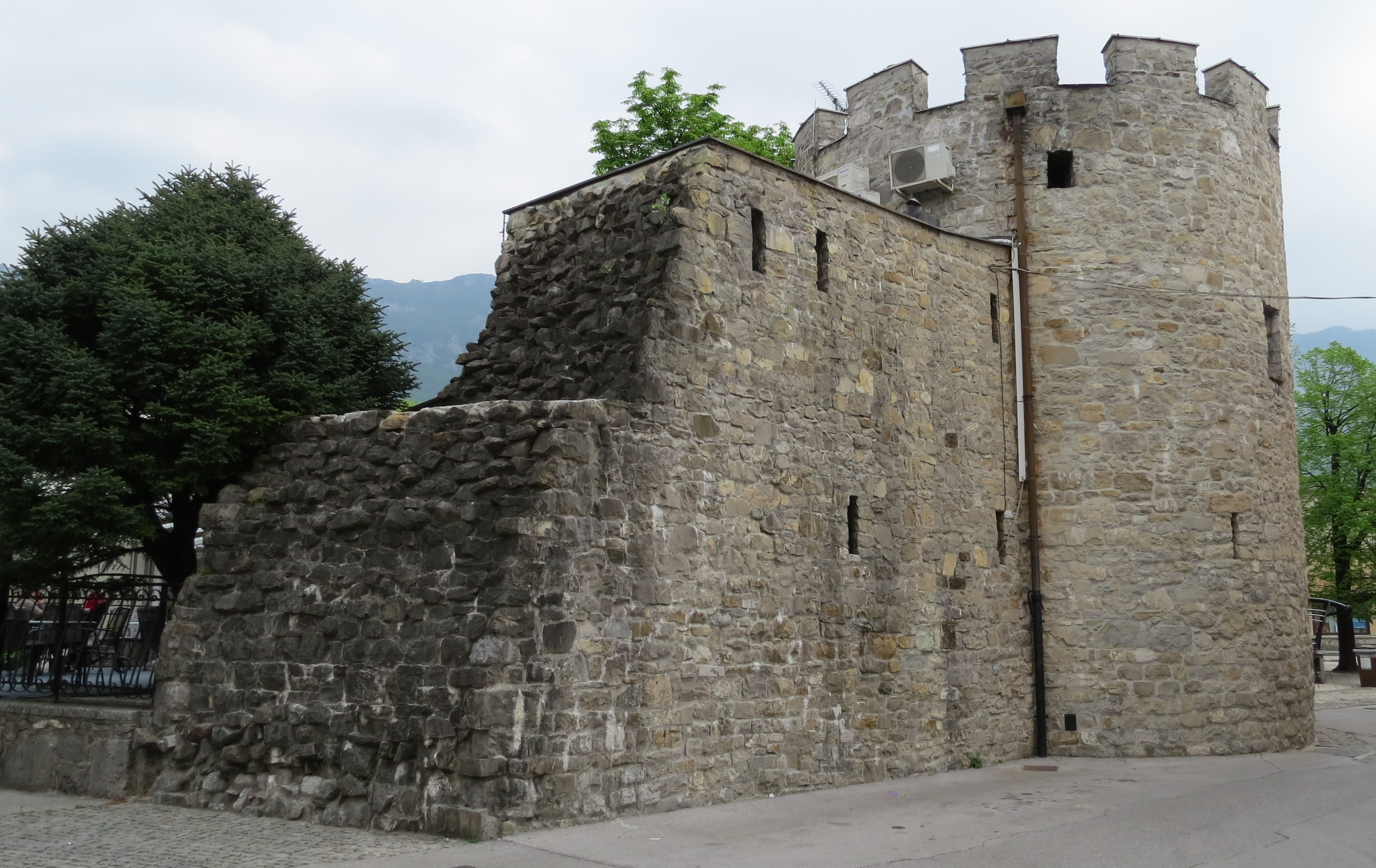
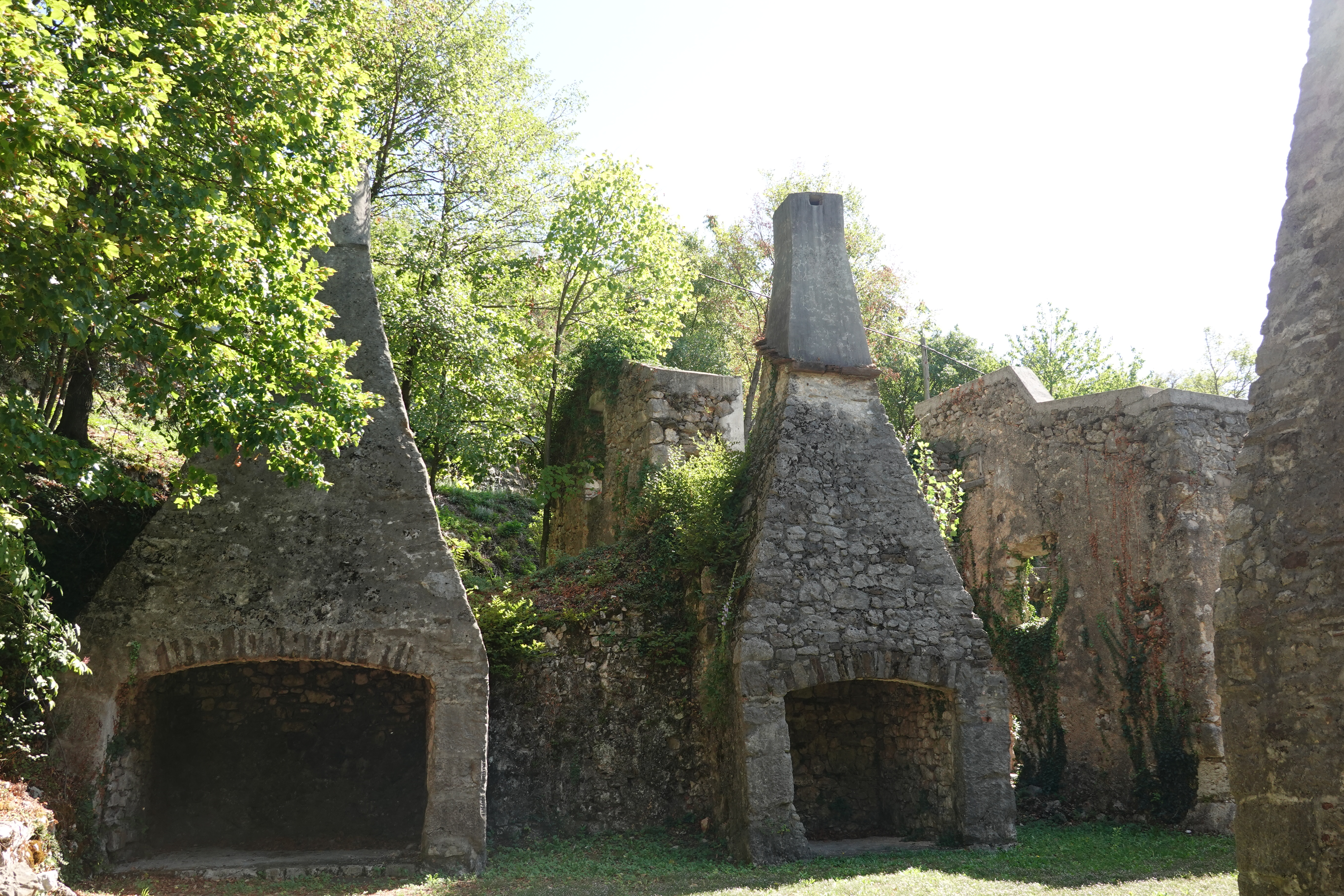
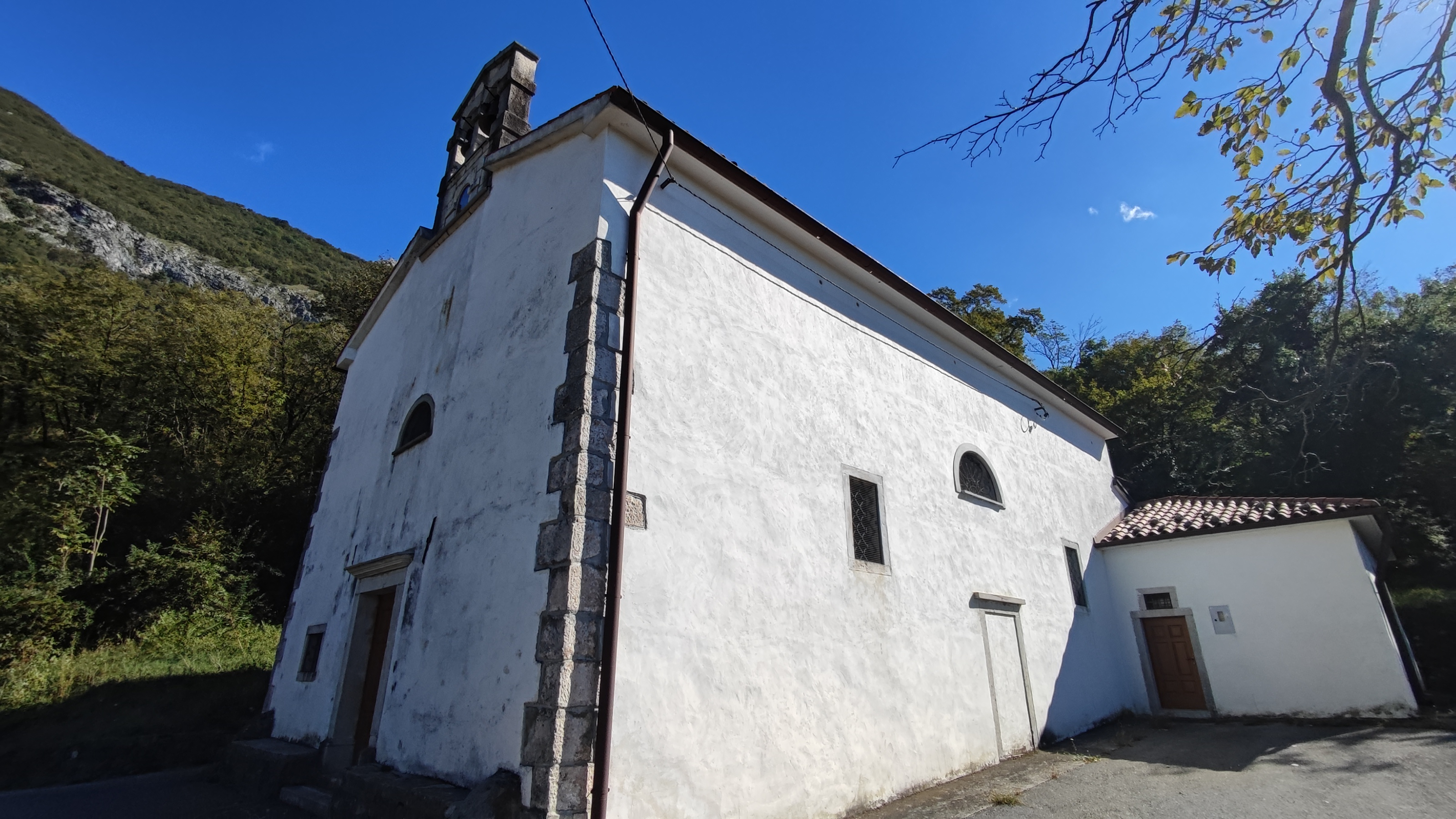
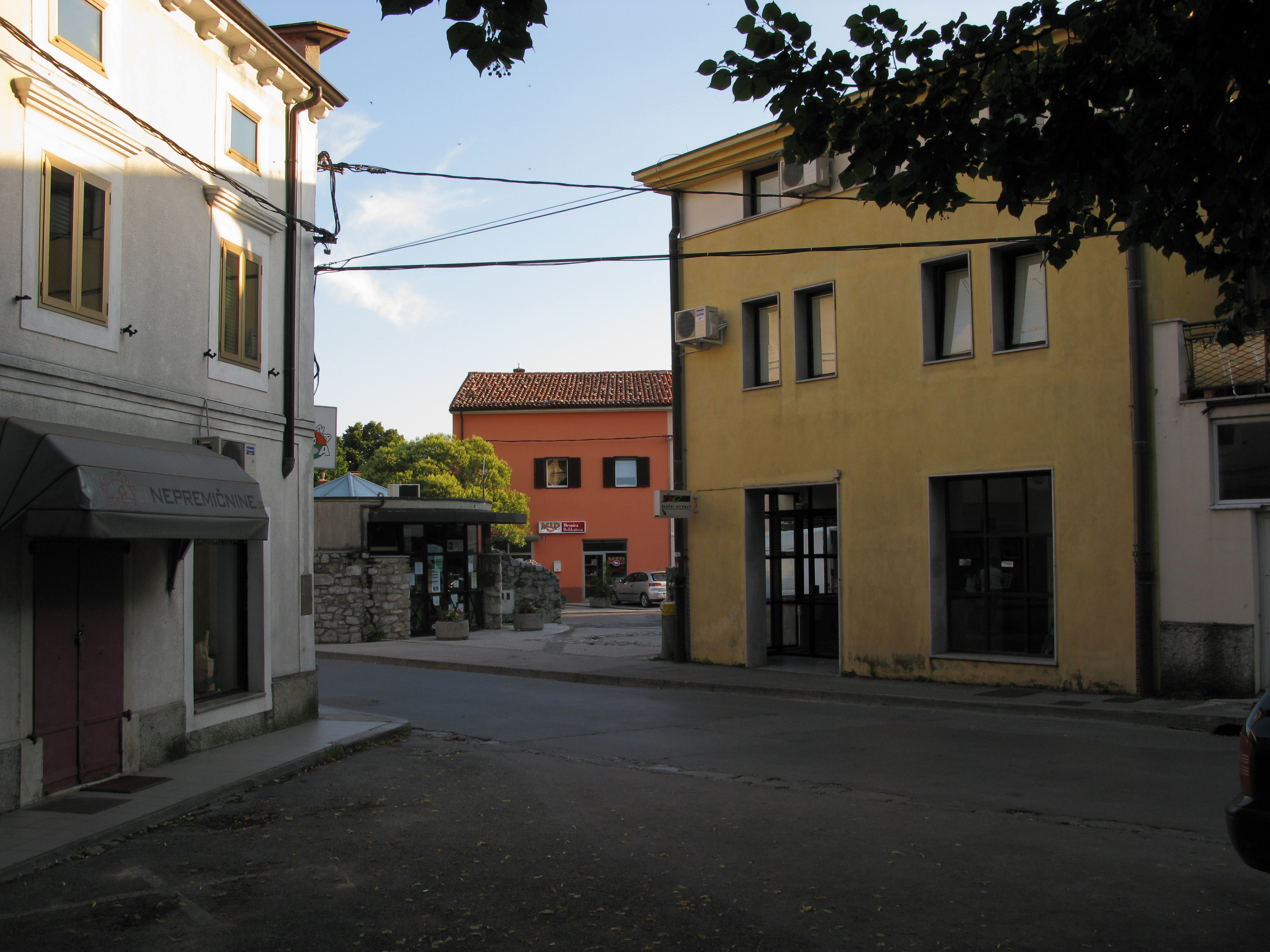
- From top, left to right: Ajdovščina from above, Railway station, Roman Castra Fort, Old ironworks, St. Anthony of Padua Church, Houses in the center

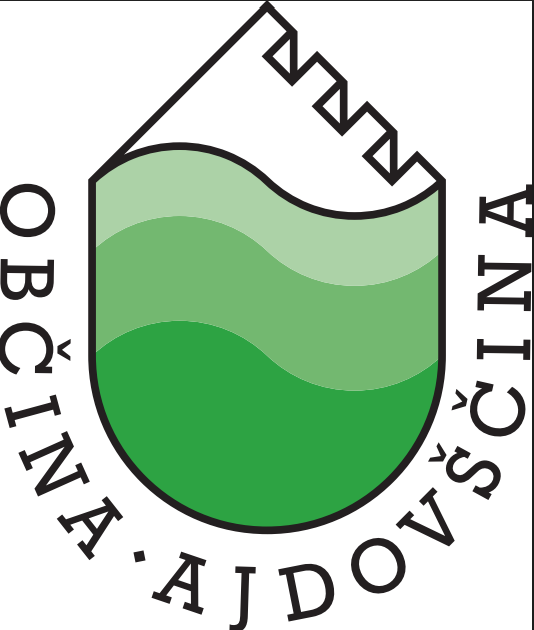
- Coat of arms

- Location in Slovenia
- Coordinates: 45°53′10″N 13°54′35″E
- Country: Slovenia
- Traditional region: Littoral
- Statistical region: Gorizia
- Municipality: Ajdovščina

Government
  - Mayor: Tadej Beočanin (SD)

Area
  - Total: 7.0 km^{2} (2.7 sq mi)
- Elevation: 106 m (348 ft)

Population (2020)
  - Total: 6,843
  - Density: 943/km^{2} (2,440/sq mi)
- Vehicle registration: GO
- Climate: Cfa

Ajdovščina (pronounced [ˈàːjdɔwʃtʃina]; Italian: Aidussina, German: Haidenschaft) is a town in the Vipava Valley (Vipavska dolina), Slovenia. It is the administrative seat of the Municipality of Ajdovščina.

== History ==
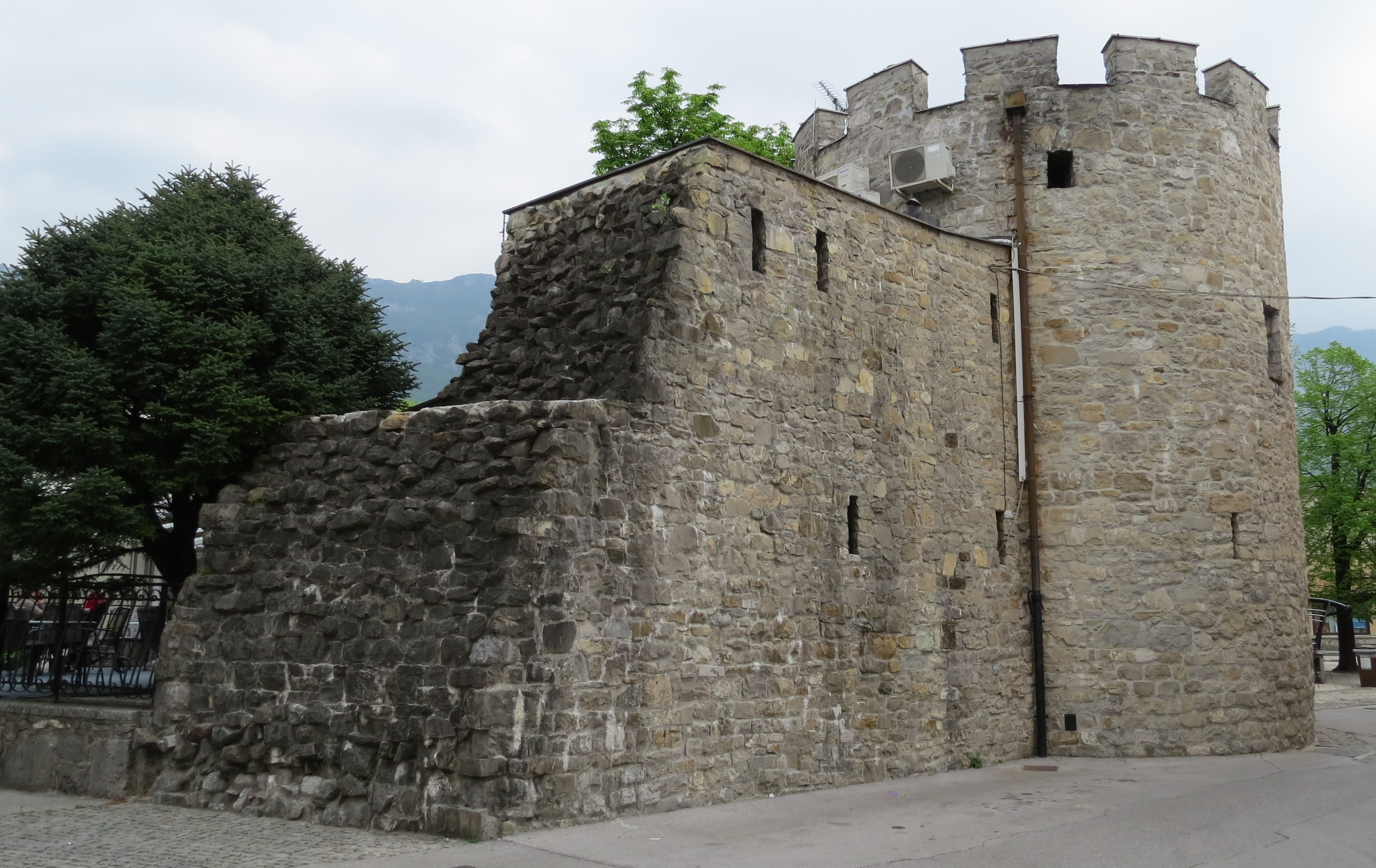
The remains of the fortress of Castra in Ajdovščina

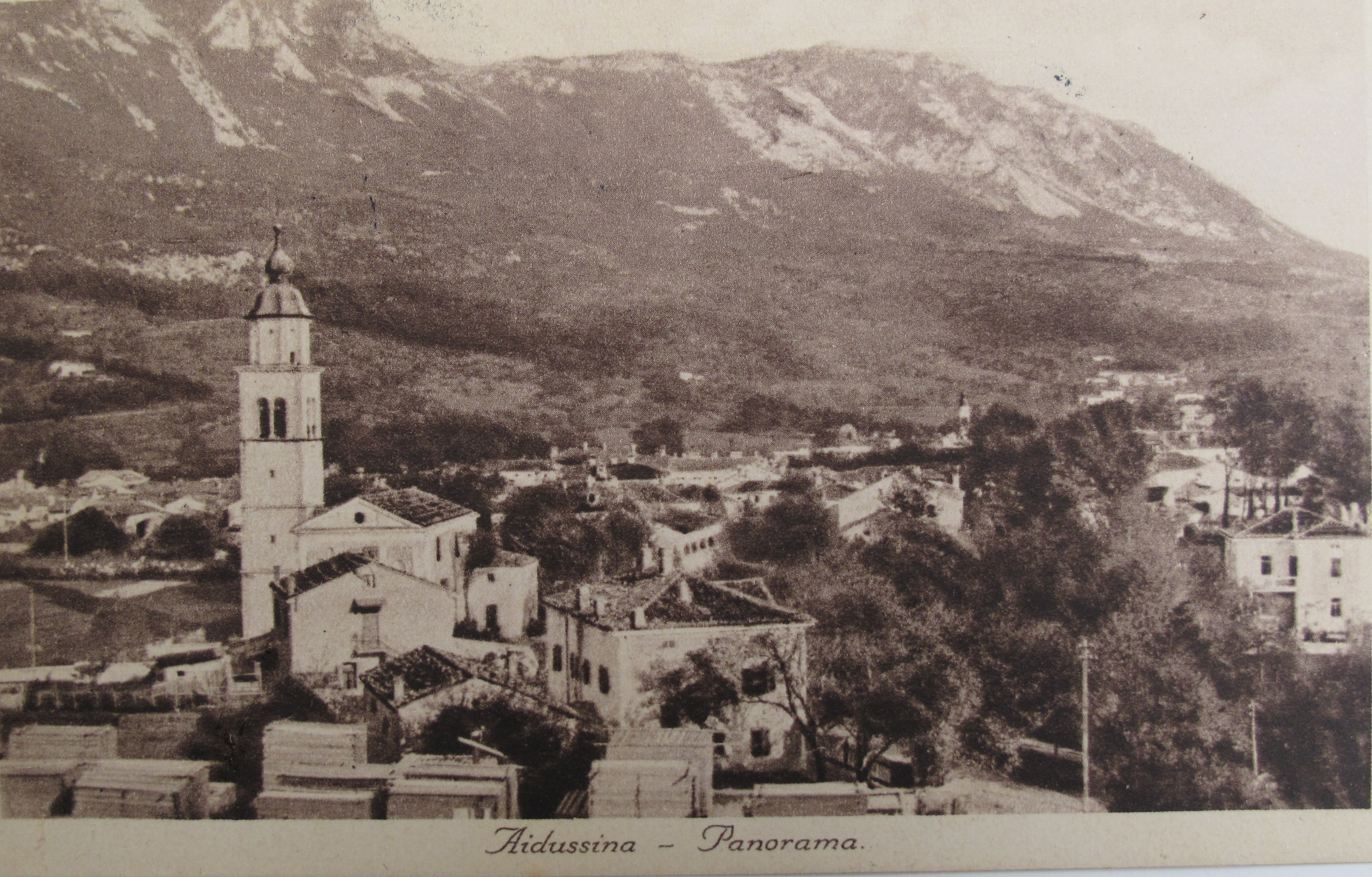
Ajdovščina before World War II

The first mentions of Ajdovščina go back to circa 2000 BC. In the Bronze Age and the Iron Age a fortified settlement stood on the nearby hill of Gradišče. In the early period of the Roman Empire, after a road was built from Aquileia towards Emona, a small post and goods station known as mansio Fluvio Frigido stood on the site of today's Ajdovščina.

In the late 3rd century and the early 4th century a fortification system, Claustra Alpium Iuliarum, which run from the Kvarner Gulf to Cividale, was built by the Roman Empire. Its centre was the fortress of Castra or Castrum ad Fluvio Frigido, the remains of which are today still visible in Ajdovščina.

Despite the fact that the Italian border is less than 20 km away and that Ajdovščina was under Italian administration from 1918 to 1947, and from 1927 as a commune of the Province of Gorizia (as Aidussina), during Italian rule (1918–1943, nominally lasted to 1947), the style of the town does not resemble that of a typical Italian town. The strong bora winds would cause damage to the usual Italian house construction. Thus the population adopted and modified the classical Karst architecture for their own needs; for example, by putting stones on roofs to weight down the tiles against the strong winds.

After World War II Ajdovščina became the economic and cultural centre of the upper Vipava Valley. Major industries include textile fabrics, construction, food, beverages, and furniture.

Ajdovščina annexed the formerly independent settlements of Gradišče and Šturje (Italian: Sturie delle Fusine) in 1953.

== Geography and climate ==
The Hubelj River is the dividing line between the two largest parts of Ajdovščina, locally known as Šturje and Ajdovščina. During the pre-World War I years the river was also the border between the Austrian lands of Gorizia and Gradisca and Carniola.

The climate is Mediterranean (minimum temperature in winter −1 °C (30 °F), maximum 17 °C (63 °F); in the summer time maximum temperature 39 °C (102 °F), minimum 20 °C (68 °F). The town is located around 25 km from the Adriatic Sea.

Historical population
Year	Pop.	±%
1948	2,444	—
1953	2,894	+18.4%
1961	3,309	+14.3%
1971	4,126	+24.7%
1981	6,095	+47.7%
1991	6,323	+3.7%
2002	6,373	+0.8%
2011	6,656	+4.4%
2021	6,922	+4.0%
Population size may be affected by changes in administrative divisions.

== Landmarks ==
=== Churches ===
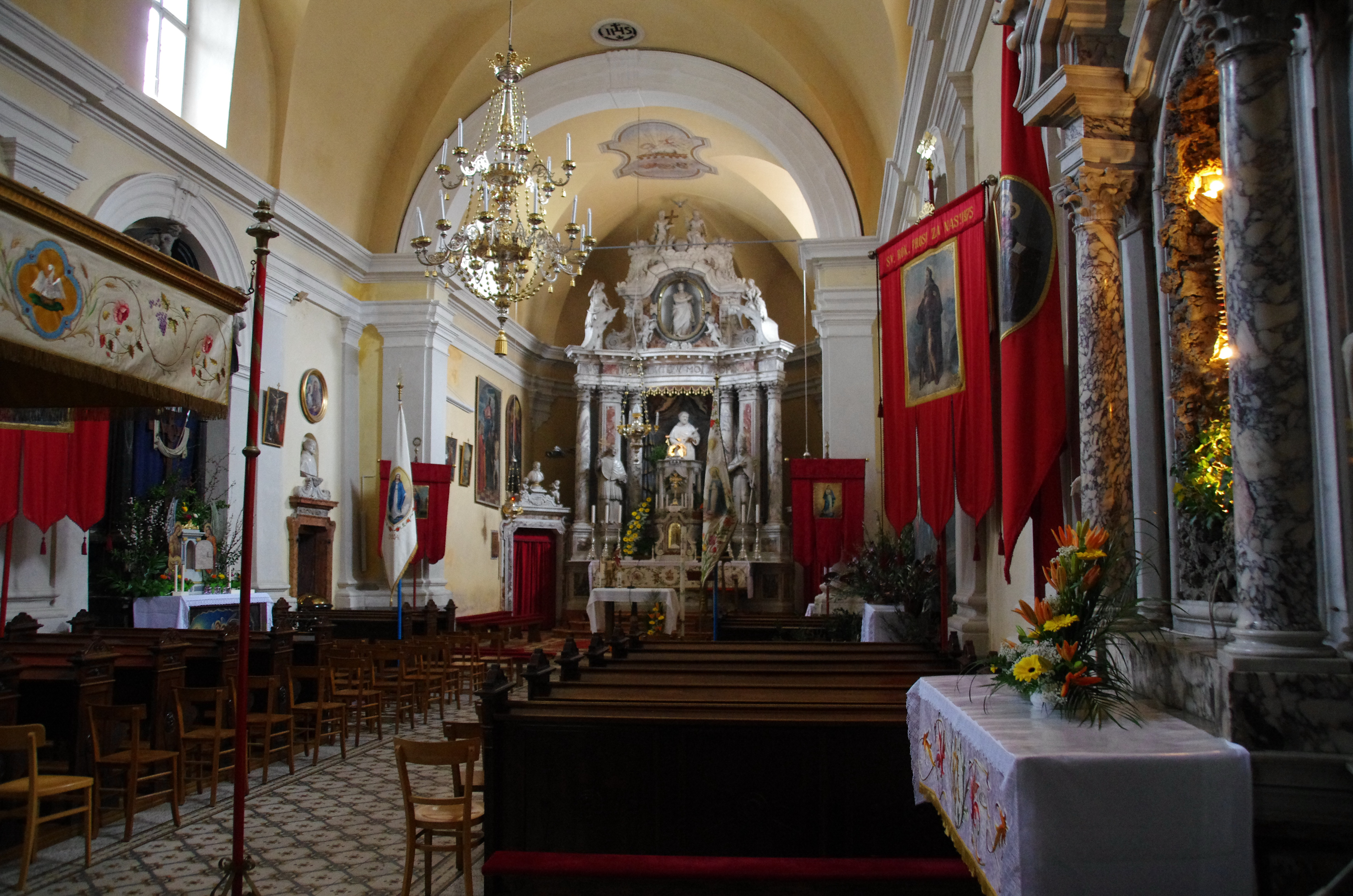
St. John the Baptist Church in Ajdovščina (interior)

The parish church in Ajdovščina is dedicated to John the Baptist and belongs to the Diocese of Koper. It is built on the site of a Roman cemetery. Its interior was painted by the local Baroque painter Anton Čebej. A second parish within the urban area of Ajdovščina is the Parish of Šturje, with the parish church dedicated to Saint George and another church dedicated to Saint Lawrence. The church in the hamlet of Fužine north of the main town, dedicated to Saint Anthony of Padua, also belongs to this parish.

== Notable residents ==
- Ivo Boscarol (born 1957), businessman
- Arthur Casagrande (1902–1981), engineer
- Anton Čebej (1722–1774), painter
- Miša Cigoj (born 1982), dancesport athlete
- Milan Klemenčič (1875–1957), puppeteer
- Karel Lavrič (1818–1876), politician
- Danilo Lokar (1892–1989), author
- Julij Mayer (1891–1983), beekeeper
- Veno Pilon (1896–1970), painter
- Avgust Žigon (1877–1941), literary historian

== See also ==
- NK Primorje
