= Anton Cebej =

Baroque Slovenian painter

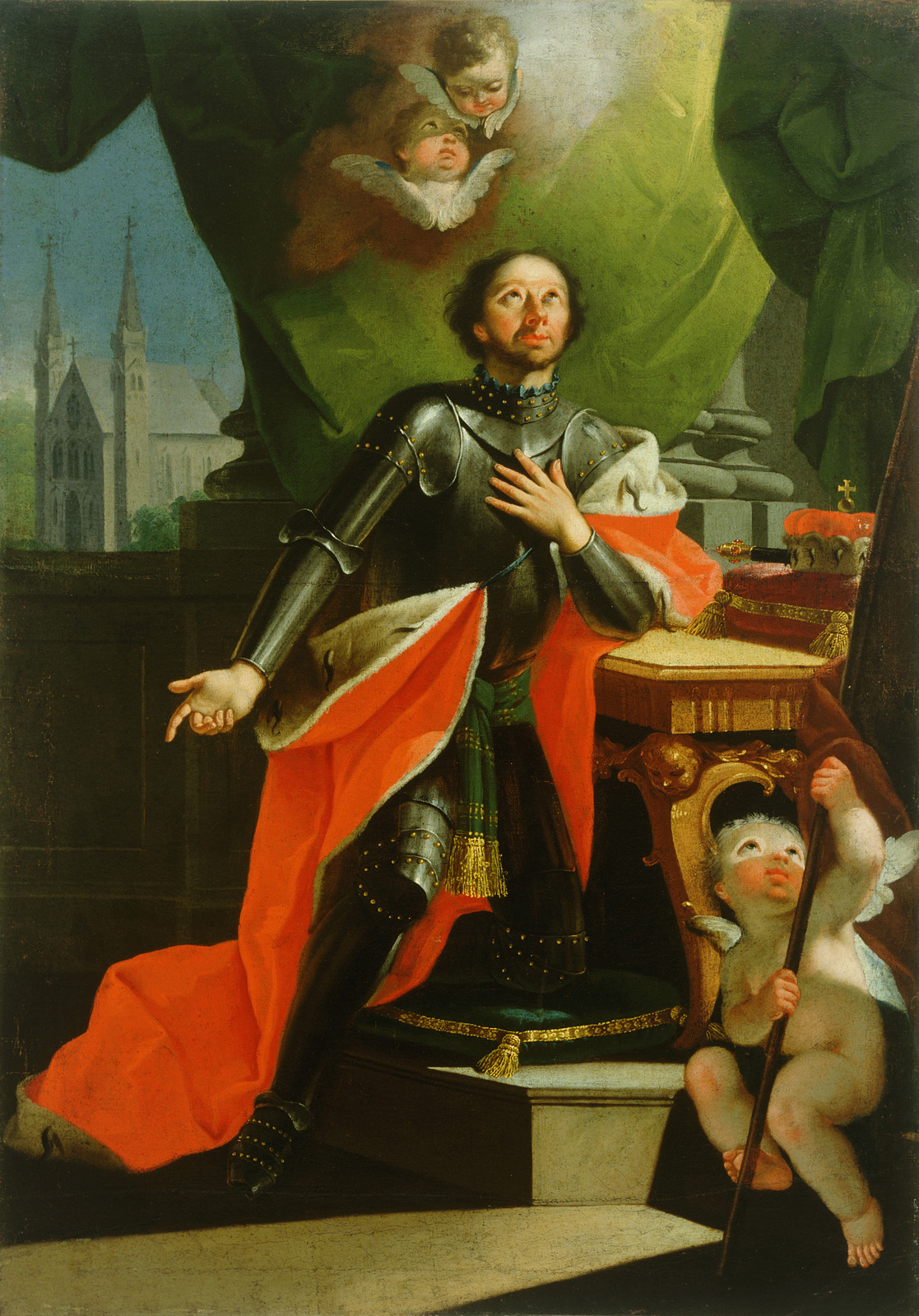
Saint Leopold of Austria

Anton Cebej, or Zebey (23 May 1722, Ajdovščina – after 1774) was a Slovenian painter, in the Baroque style.

== Biography ==
Very little is known about his life. The information that is available is derived entirely from a history of his works, the first of which appeared in 1750, and the last in 1774. He lived in Ljubljana for the bulk of his career, but he was apparently not part of the artistic community there.

His paintings show an obvious Venetian influence, but certain stylistic elements suggest that he had contact with and may have taken lessons from Giulio Quaglio and Valentin Metzinger, the latter of whom was particularly influential. After Metzinger's death in 1759, Cebej also took on some of his clients.

In the 1760s, he reached what is generally considered to be his artistic peak. By the 1770s, his paintings had become simpler, with fewer figures and less dramatic feeling. His frescoes underwent a similar change. He was the only artist there at the time who was proficient in both media.

Archival records indicate that he also made plans for altars. About ninety works of all types have been recorded in Slovenia and Croatia, but some are now lost. Many of his works are stored at the National Museum of Slovenia. Important records relating to his work are preserved at Saint John the Baptist Church in Ajdovščina.
