= Castra ad Fluvium Frigidum =

Late-Roman fortress

Coordinates: 45°53′21.3″N 13°54′18.9″E

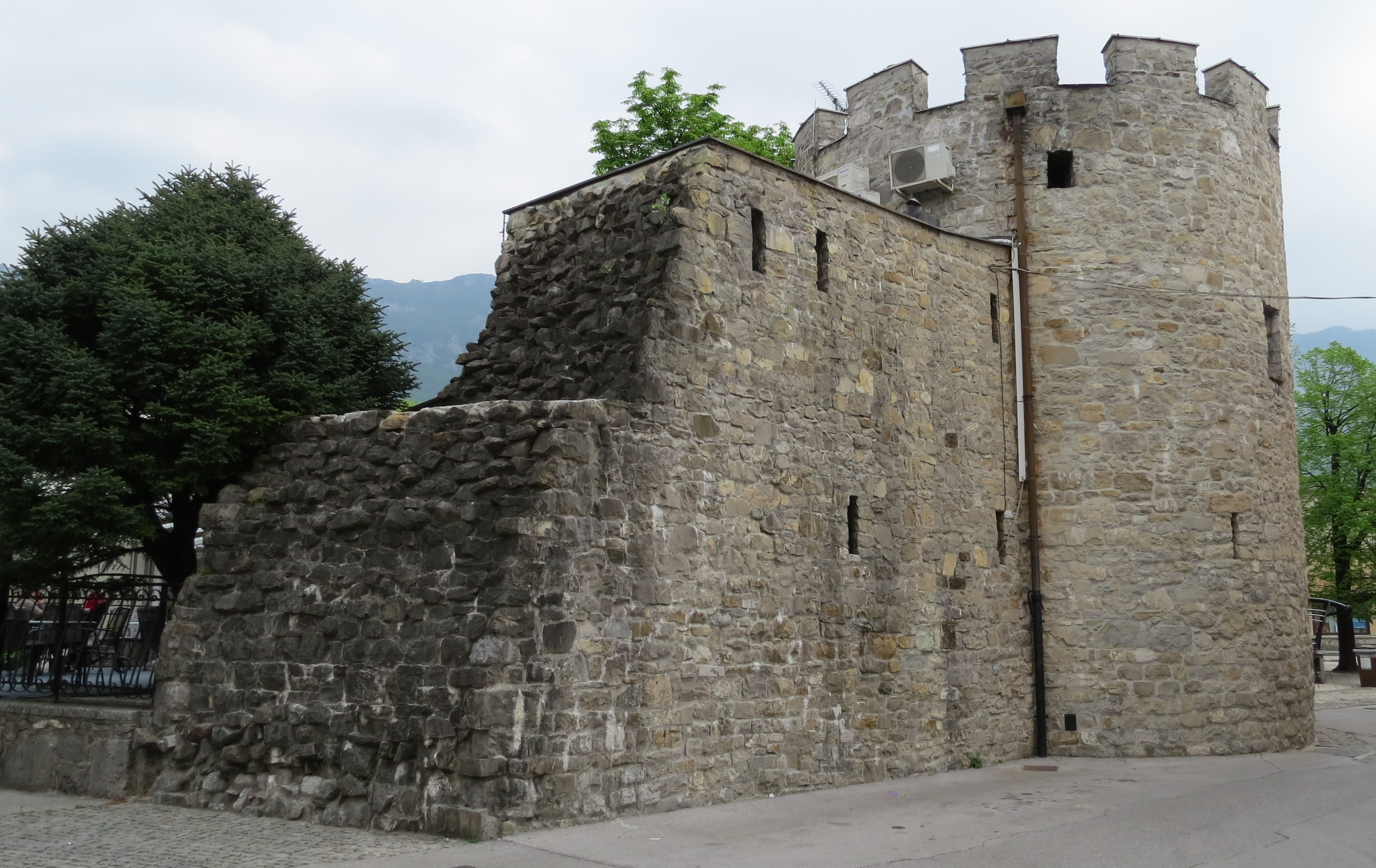
Remnants of the Ancient Roman Castra

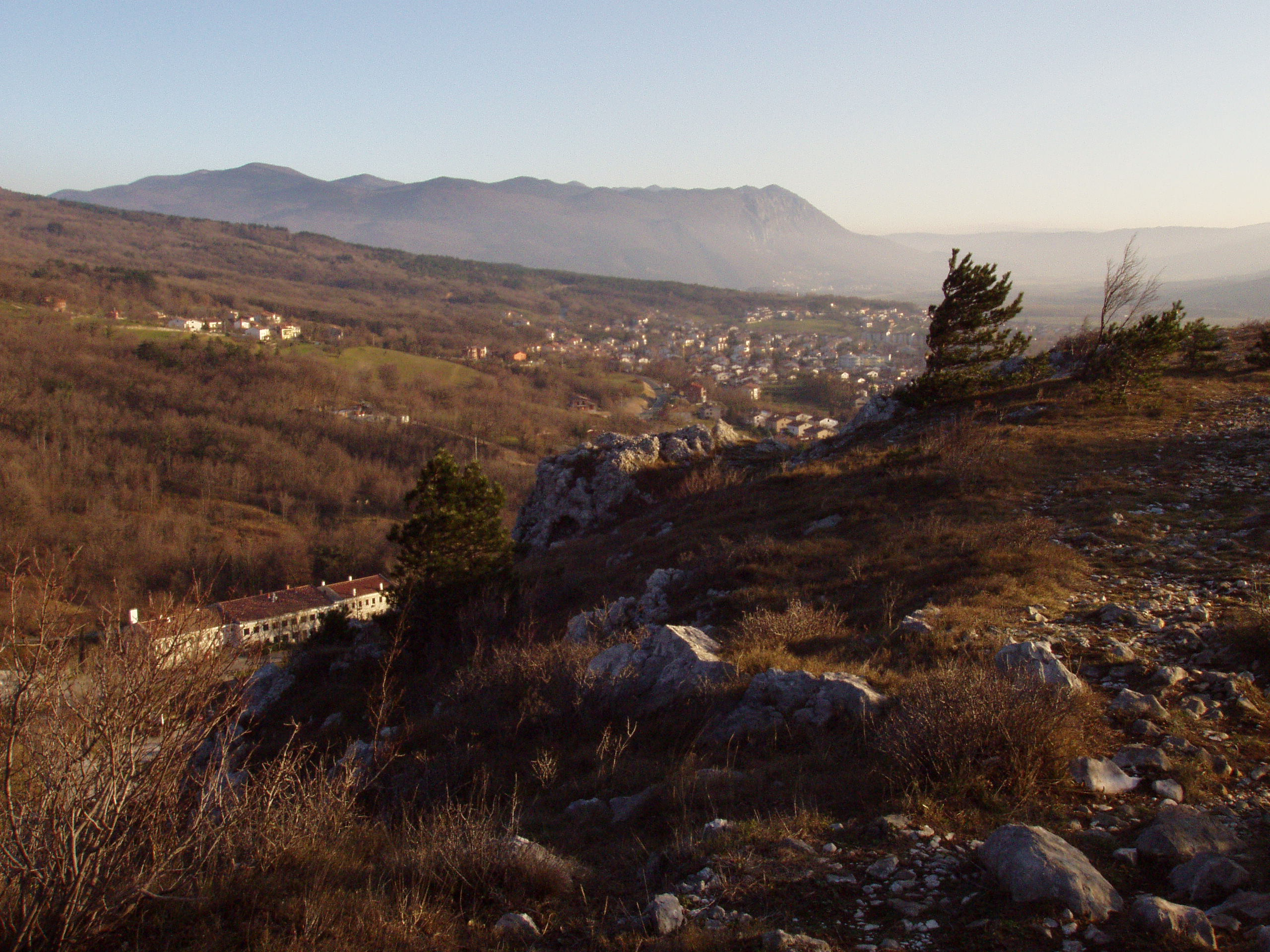
The Vipava Valley with Ajdovščina

Castra ad Fluvium Frigidum (Latin for 'Fortress by the Cold River'), also simply Castra (Slovene: Kastra), referred to as mutatio Castra (Castra relay station) in Itinerarium Burdigalense, was a Late-Roman fortress (castrum) which constituted the centre of Claustra Alpium Iuliarum, an Ancient Roman defensive system of walls and towers stretching from the Gail Valley (now Carinthia, Austria) to the Učka mountain range (now Croatia). On its grounds, the Late Medieval market settlement of Ajdovščina developed.

The fortress was built on the grounds of an Early Roman settlement next to the confluence of the Hubelj River and Lokavšček Creek in the Vipava Valley (now in southwestern Slovenia), along the road Via Gemina from Aquileia to Emona, in the early 270s. It had a permanent military crew and command. In ancient sources, it is related to the Battle of Frigidus, between the army of the Eastern Emperor Theodosius I and the army of Western Roman ruler Eugenius, in 394, albeit it had a peripheral role, as it was probably used only for the encampment of Eugenius's infantry. It was depicted in the 5th-century register Notitia Dignitatum. It was demolished by Attila, the ruler of the Huns, in 451.

The fortress in a form of an irregular polygon had a defensive wall (called in Slovene 'Boštajna') and fourteen defensive towers. Its width was c. 220 metres (720 ft), its length was c. 160 m (520 ft), and its full perimeter was c. 600 m (2,000 ft). The wall had a thickness of 3.4 m (11 ft). The square towers had a height of at least 6 m (20 ft). Seven towers and a part of the wall have been preserved. A ditch surrounded the fortress. Extensive archaeological research has been conducted at the site. In addition to the already known ruins, several urn and skeletal graves, smaller Roman baths with a caldarium, and, in September 2016, the eleventh defensive tower have been discovered.
