= Lokar (surname) =

Lokar is a surname. Notable people with the surname include:

- Claudia Lokar (born 1964), German long-distance runner
- Danilo Lokar (1892–1989), Slovene writer
- Miha Lokar (born 1935), Slovene basketball player
