= Ad Pirum =

Roman fortress

Coordinates: 45°51′49″N 14°06′42″E

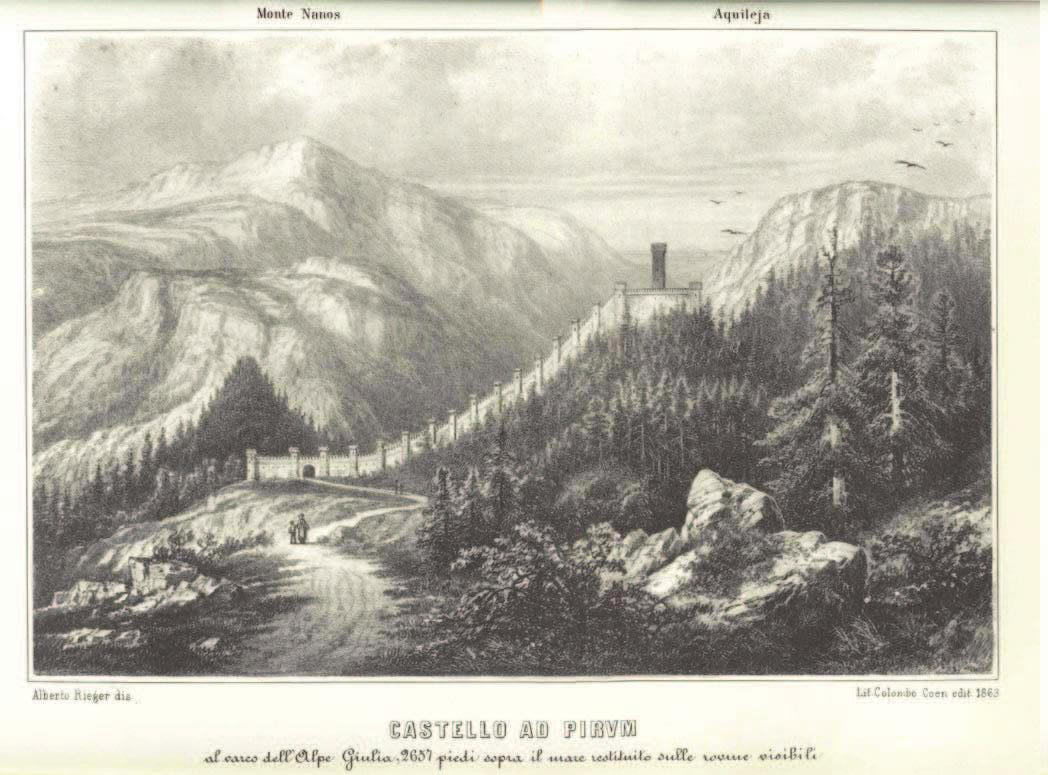
1863 lithograph with a reconstruction of Ad Pirum

Ad Pirum was a Roman fortress. It was active during the time of the late Roman Empire. It is located on the Hrušica Plateau in southwestern Slovenia, in the hamlet of Hrušica in Podkraj. It was built in the 320s.

== Structure and function ==
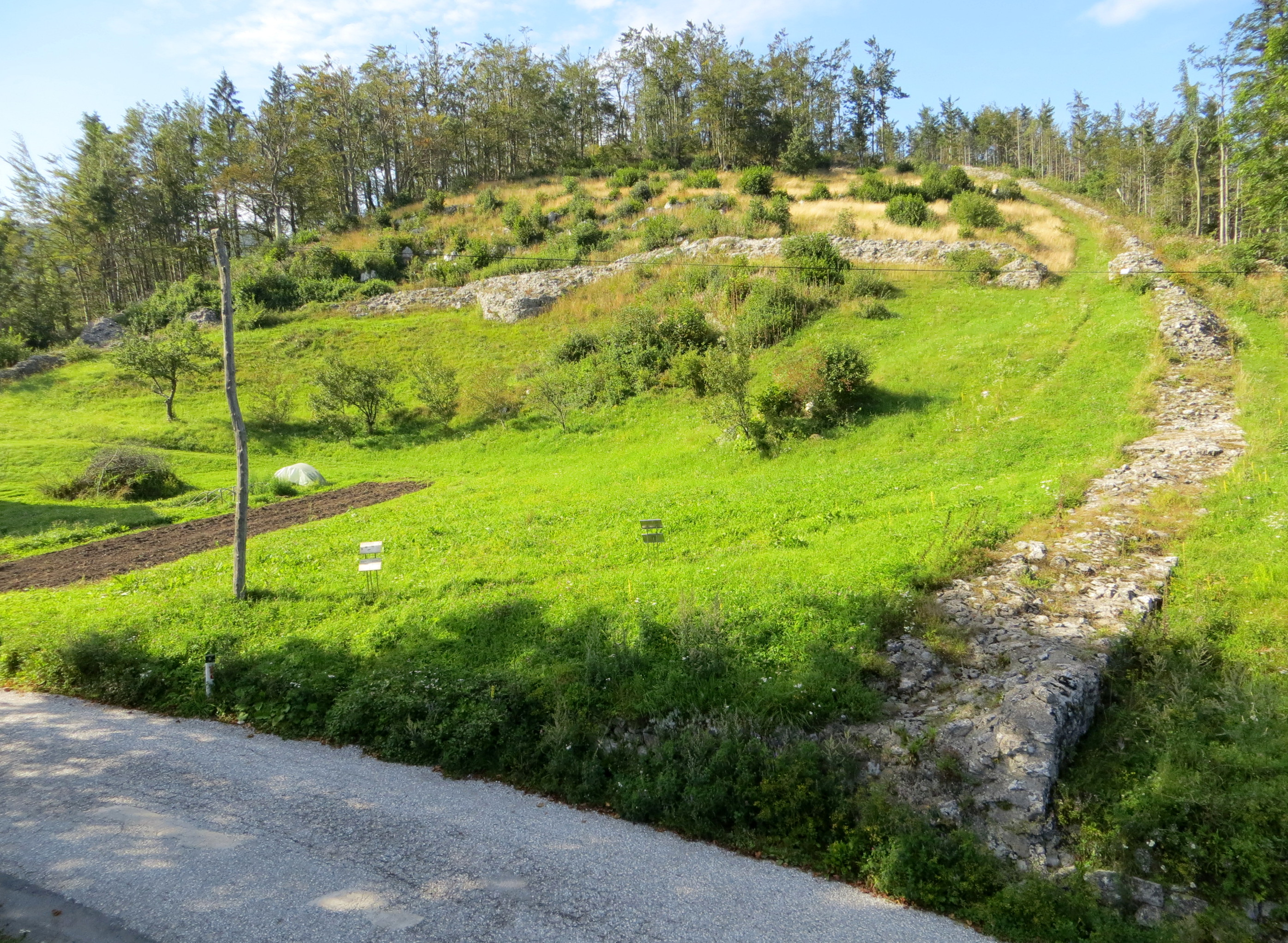
Remnants of Ad Pirum

Excavations reveal the fortress to have an oval shape, 250 metres (820 ft) in length, 30 to 80 m (98 to 262 ft) in width, and with a wall at a height of 6–8 m and a thickness of about 2.7m; the wall towers were 10 m high. This structure represented a major fort of the Claustra Alpium Iuliarum. Claustra Alpium Iuliarum is a network of forts and walls built to secure Roman Italy from eastern invasions. It also guarded the road between Roman Italy and Pannonia. It was typically manned by 500 soldiers.

External videos
- A 3D reconstruction of the fort, YouTube
