= Valentin Metzinger =

French painter

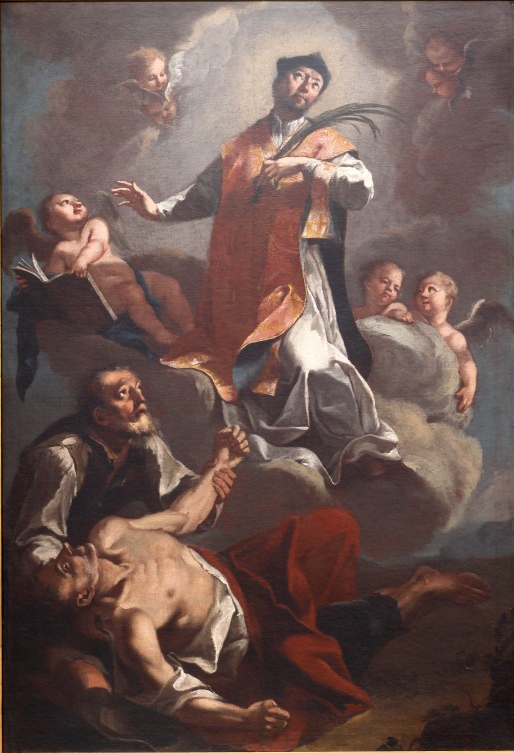
The Triumph of Saint Valentine

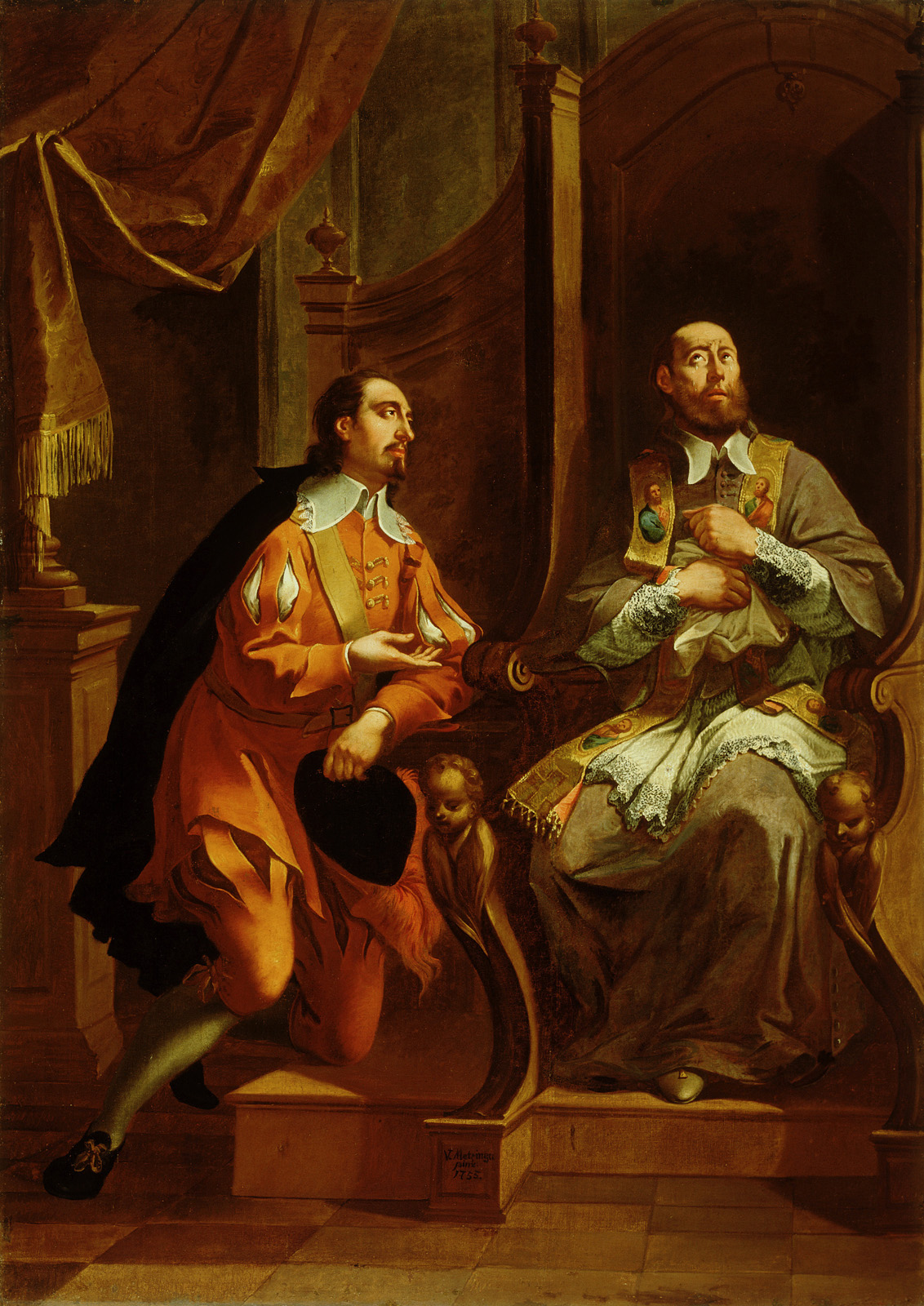
Saint Francis de Sales Confesses to a Nobleman

Jean-Valentin Metzinger (19 April 1699, Saint-Avold – 12 March 1759, Ljubljana) was a French-born Austrian-Slovenian painter, in the Baroque style.

== Life and work ==
His ancestors were originally from Italy. He was one of twelve children born to François Metzinger (died 1721), and his wife, Maria Magdalena née Valentini; including his twin brother, Jean-Philippe. Where he had his first painting lessons is unknown. He later studied in Bologna, Venice and Rome, but there is no record of attendance at any academies. In Rome, his primary contacts were with other French artists, although he seems to have been influenced by Guido Reni, Peter Paul Rubens and Bartolomé Esteban Murillo, among others. Some speculations have centered on time in Germany, but those influences are not apparent until much later in his life.

The first known reference to his presence in Ljubljana (then called Laibach) is in a municipal revenue book, from 1727, when he made a payment toward acquiring a license. In that record, he is described as a "professional painter". Why he chose to settle there is unknown. He was married in 1731, to an older woman, and had no children.

His first employment came from the Franciscans, who commissioned numerous works between 1727 and 1730, in Novo mesto (Neustädtl) and Brežice (Rann). Some of his projects were accomplished in areas that are now part of Croatia, including Jastrebarsko, Samobor, Klanjec, and Trsat. He also received commissions from the Capuchins. His individual clients included the theologians, Anton Erberg and Maximilian Leopold Rasp, and Bishop Ernst Gottlieb von Attems.

His wife preceded him in death by six months. He died, following a long illness, at the age of sixty; leaving his estate to a nephew. Although he never had any formal students, his paintings are cited as having influenced Anton Cebej and Janez Potočnika. Most of his works are in Ljubljana, but they may also be seen in Styria, Passau, and Trieste. Over 500 works have been attributed to him, although many may have largely been done by assistants in his workshop. Some exist in several versions.
