= Danilo Lokar =

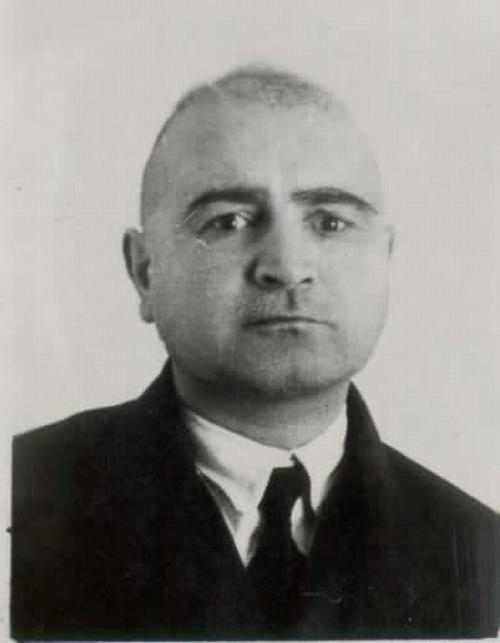
- Danilo Lokar in 1933
- Born: 9 May 1892; Ajdovščina, Austria-Hungary (now in Slovenia)
- Died: 21 July 1989 (aged 97); Ljubljana, Slovenia, Yugoslavia
- Occupation: Writer
- Spouse: Jelka Špacapan
- Writing career
- Notable awards: Prešeren Award; 1959 for Sodni dan na Vasi

Danilo Lokar (9 May 1892 – 21 July 1989) was a Slovene physician and expressionist writer.

== Life ==
He was born in the town of Ajdovščina in the County of Gorizia and Gradisca, in what was then Austria-Hungary (today in Slovenia). Danilo was the oldest of six children in a family which made its living through tanning, and which ran a small leather shop. He graduated from the Gorizia State Grammar School in 1910 and entered the University of Vienna, where he studied medicine. Upon finishing he returned to his birthplace with Jelka Špacapan, who was to become his wife, and began working as a doctor. In Ajdovščina he made the acquaintance of painter Veno Pilon.

Lokar did specialist work in Zagreb for a time before realizing that he could not work as a surgeon due to his poor health; as a consequence he decided to become a writer. In 1933 he published his first short story, "The Dance", in the progressive literary review Sodobnost. During World War II he was imprisoned by the Italian Fascist authorities in the concentration camp at Medea, in the Friuli region. Upon the Italian armistice he joined the partisan forces together with his wife. After the war he worked as a doctor until 1951, when he retired, fully dedicating his time to writing. In 1959 he won the Prešeren Award, the highest Slovenian prize for artistic achievements, for his short story collection Sodni dan na Vasi ("Doomsday in the Village").

Lokar died in Ljubljana in 1989 and was buried in his hometown.

Danilo Lokar was the brother-in-law of the Slovene Communist theoretician Dragotin Gustinčič and uncle of the renowned journalist Jurij Gustinčič.

== Work ==
Lokar's stories often describe people from the Vipava Valley and its surroundings. Artistic elements, especially related to painting, can often be seen in his plots; these are frequently fleshed out with more essay-like passages. Lokar's work is known mostly for its expressionist manner and for the peculiar worldview which it espouses.
