= Nauportus =

Coordinates: 45°58′10.78″N 14°18′10.91″E

Nauportus (Navport, Navportus) (Ancient Greek: Ναύπορτον) was an ancient Roman town in Pannonia Superior (later 10th Italian region) on the road from Aquileia to Emona with a port at the Nauportus river, now the Ljubljanica River, Slovenia.

Strabo wrote that near Nauportus was a river, called Corcoras (Ancient Greek: Κορκόρας), which received the cargoes.

According to historian Pliny the Elder, the name was derived from the legendary landing of the Argonauts at the river, where they are said to have founded the town.

Tacitus reports that in year 14, the town was plundered by mutinous Roman forces that has been sent to build roads and bridges.

Remains of Nauportus were found in present-day Vrhnika in central Slovenia. A Late Roman emporium with warehouses and a central market was located and excavated at riverbanks. Traces of the defense system of Claustra Alpium Iuliarum, a guard tower, and a Late Roman castellum can be seen in Vrhnika and in vicinity.
