= Via Gemina =

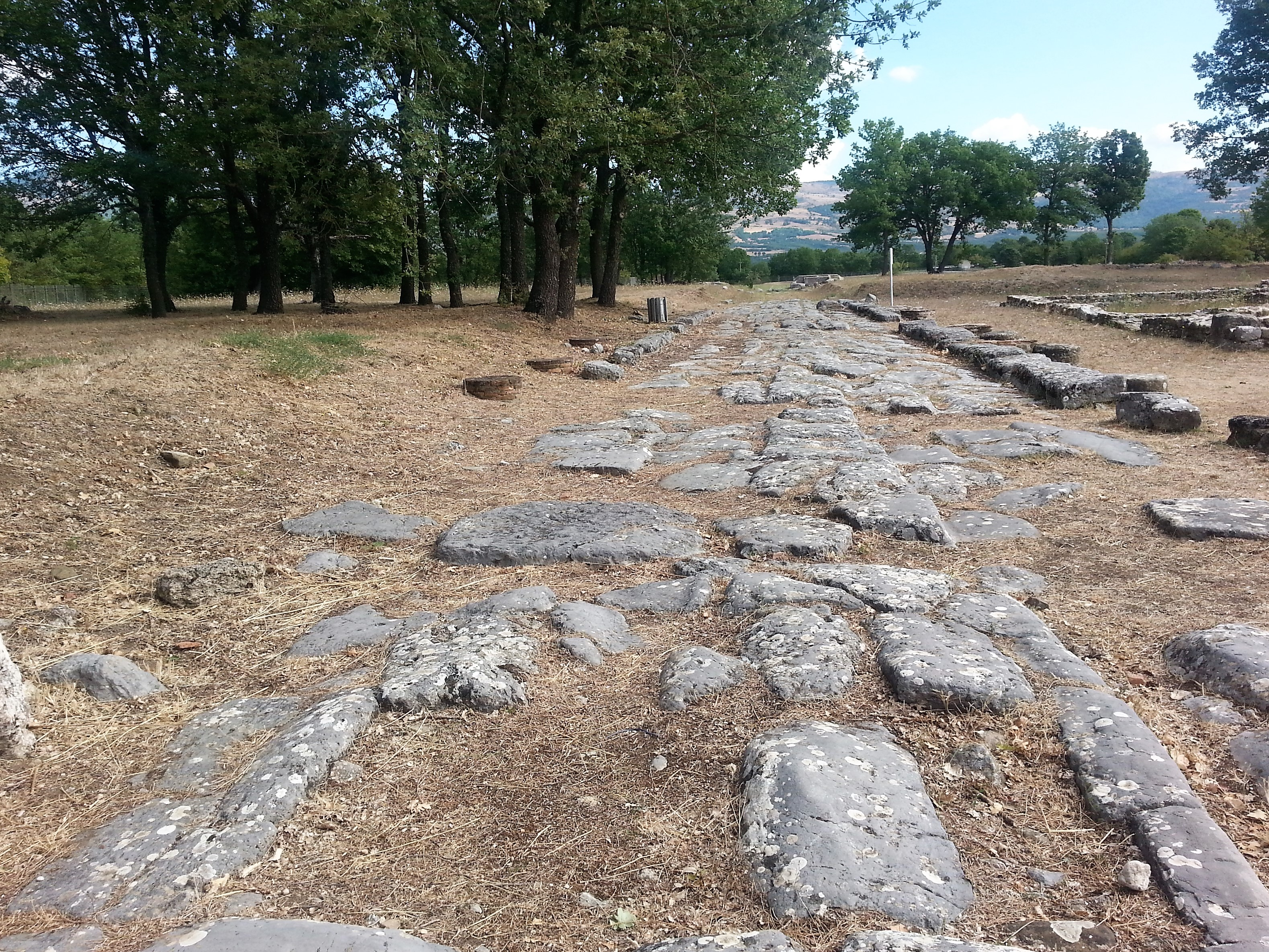

Via Gemina was the Roman road linking Aquileia and Emona (the modern Ljubljana). It was built in 14 AD by the legio XIII Gemina. In spite of the name given by its constructors it was said it took its name, the "twin road", from the circumstance that it departed from Aquileia along with the Via Postumia.

The road went from Aquileia and followed the Vipava Valley between the mouth of the river Vipava into the Soča at Pons Sonti (Gradisca d'Isonzo) and the later town Vipava, through the Karst district to Nauportus and Emona (Ljubljana), forming a first itinerary of the Amber Road, which left the Roman territory at Carnuntum.

Nauportus had been plundered by the road builders in 14 AD, according to Tacitus.
