= Gradište (Pirot) =

Gradište Градиште
- Village
- Location within Serbia
- Coordinates: 43°03′50″N 22°41′45″E
- Country: Serbia
- Region: Southern and Eastern Serbia
- District: Pirot
- Municipality: Pirot

Population (2002)
  - Total: 86
- Time zone: UTC+1 (CET)
  - Summer (DST): UTC+2 (CEST)

Gradište is a village in the municipality of Pirot, Serbia. According to the 2002 census, the village has a population of 86 people.
