= Podkraj, Ajdovščina =

Podkraj
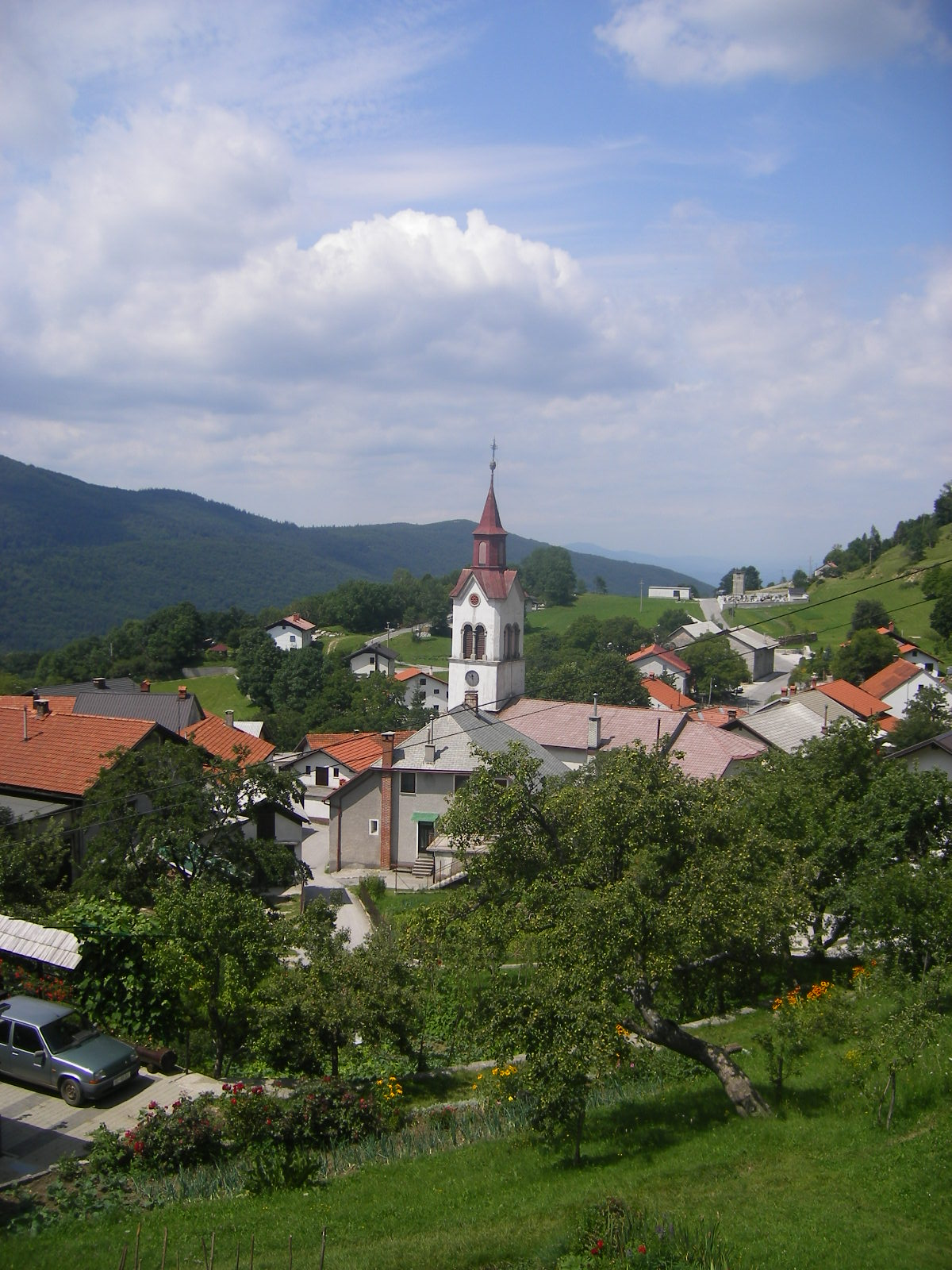
- Podkraj with St. Margaret's Parish Church

- Location in Slovenia
- Coordinates: 45°51′50.31″N 14°3′39.93″E
- Country: Slovenia
- Traditional region: Littoral
- Statistical region: Gorizia
- Municipality: Ajdovščina

Area
  - Total: 19.52 km^{2} (7.54 sq mi)
- Elevation: 808.2 m (2,652 ft)

Population (2020)
  - Total: 421
  - Density: 21.6/km^{2} (55.9/sq mi)

Podkraj (pronounced [ˈpoːtkɾai̯]) is a village southeast of Col in the Municipality of Ajdovščina in the Littoral region of Slovenia. It also includes smaller clusters of the hamlets of Trševje, Sreboti, and Hrušica (German: Birnbaum) as well as a number of isolated farmsteads along the road from Col to Kalce.

The Ad Pirum archaeological site is located in the hamlet of Hrušica.

== Churches ==
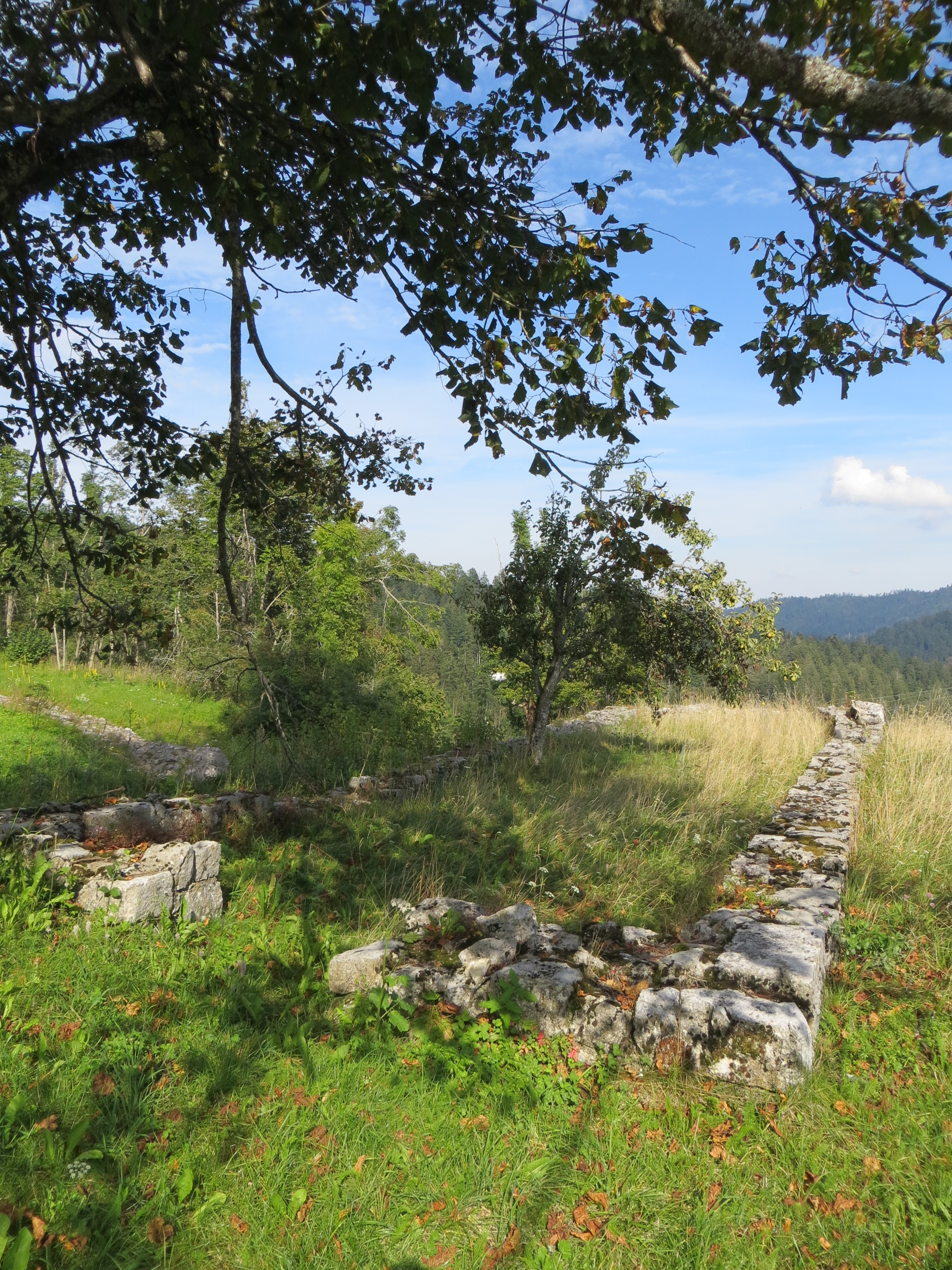
Ruins of Saint Gertrude's Church

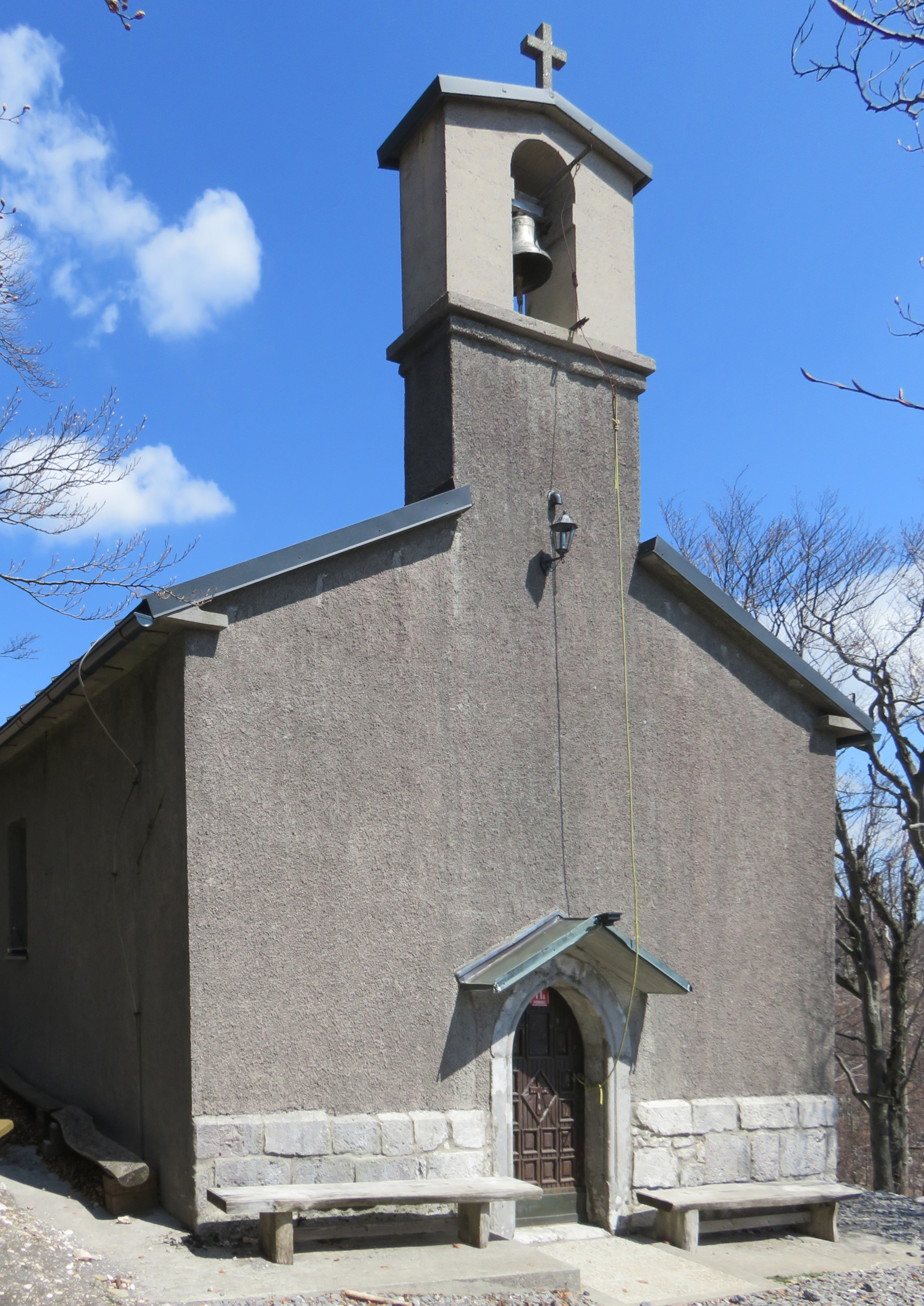
Holy Spirit Church

The parish church in the settlement is dedicated to Saint Margaret and belongs to the Diocese of Koper. It was built in 1865 at the site of an older predecessor upon the plans by Matija Ozbič. A second church in the settlement belonging to the same parish is dedicated to the Holy Spirit. The ruins of a 15th-century church dedicated to Saint Gertrude lie in the hamlet of Hrušica. It was built on the site of a 12th-century predecessor.
