= Jurij Gustinčič =

Slovene journalist (1921–2014)

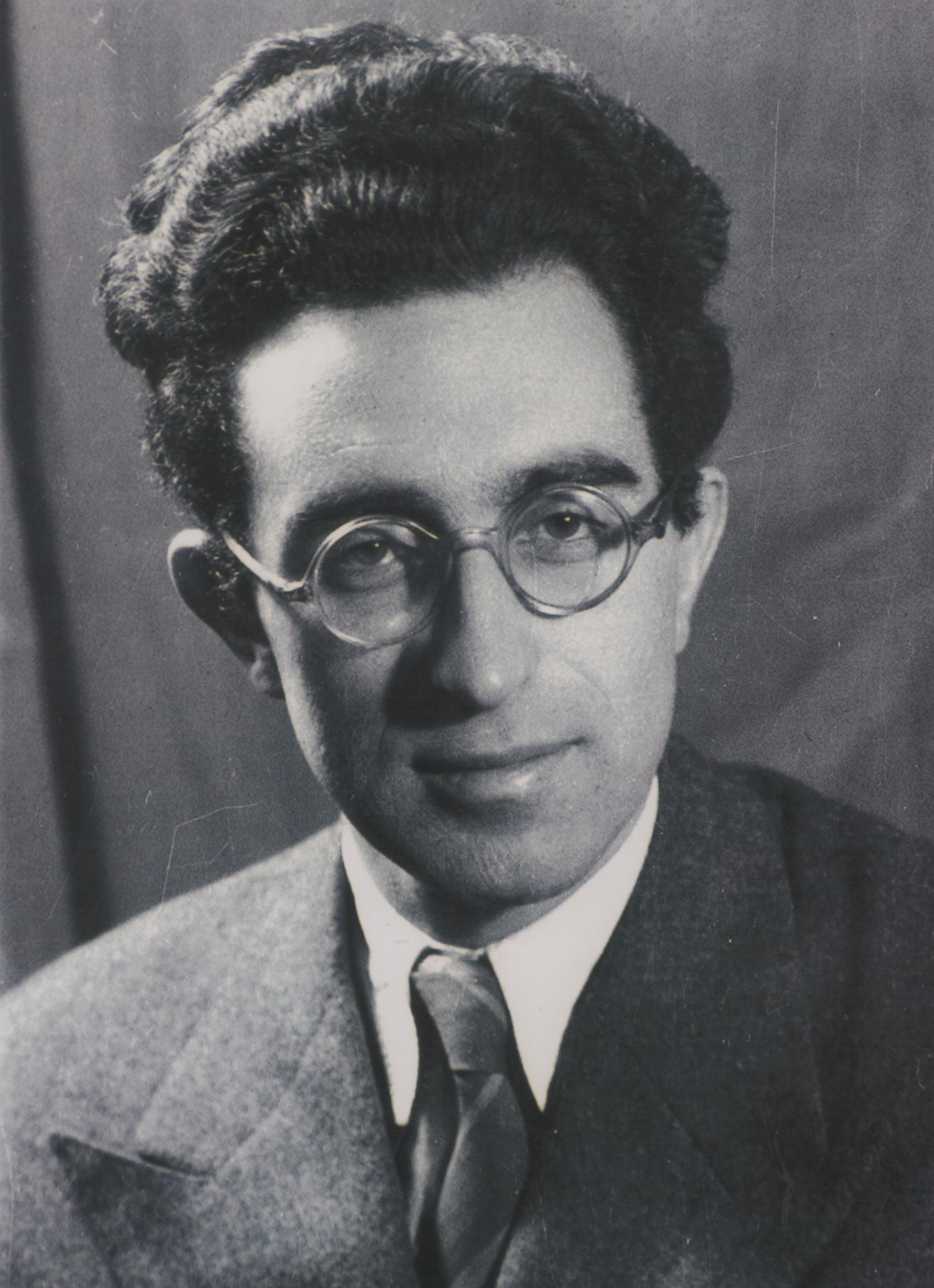
Jurij Gustinčič in 1950

Jurij Gustinčič (30 August 1921 in Trieste - 7 June 2014 in Piran) was a Slovene journalist. Chief of the Belgrade journal Politika in 1951, in 1955 he was sent for nine years as a correspondent in London, and then 14 years in New York City. In 1974, he was praised by the Washington Post for foretelling the downfall of President Richard Nixon. In the early 1980s he worked for TV Ljubljana before retiring in 1985. The leading Slovene website Slovenia.si called him a "legend of Slovene journalism" upon his 90th birthday in 2011.
