= Hrušica (plateau) =

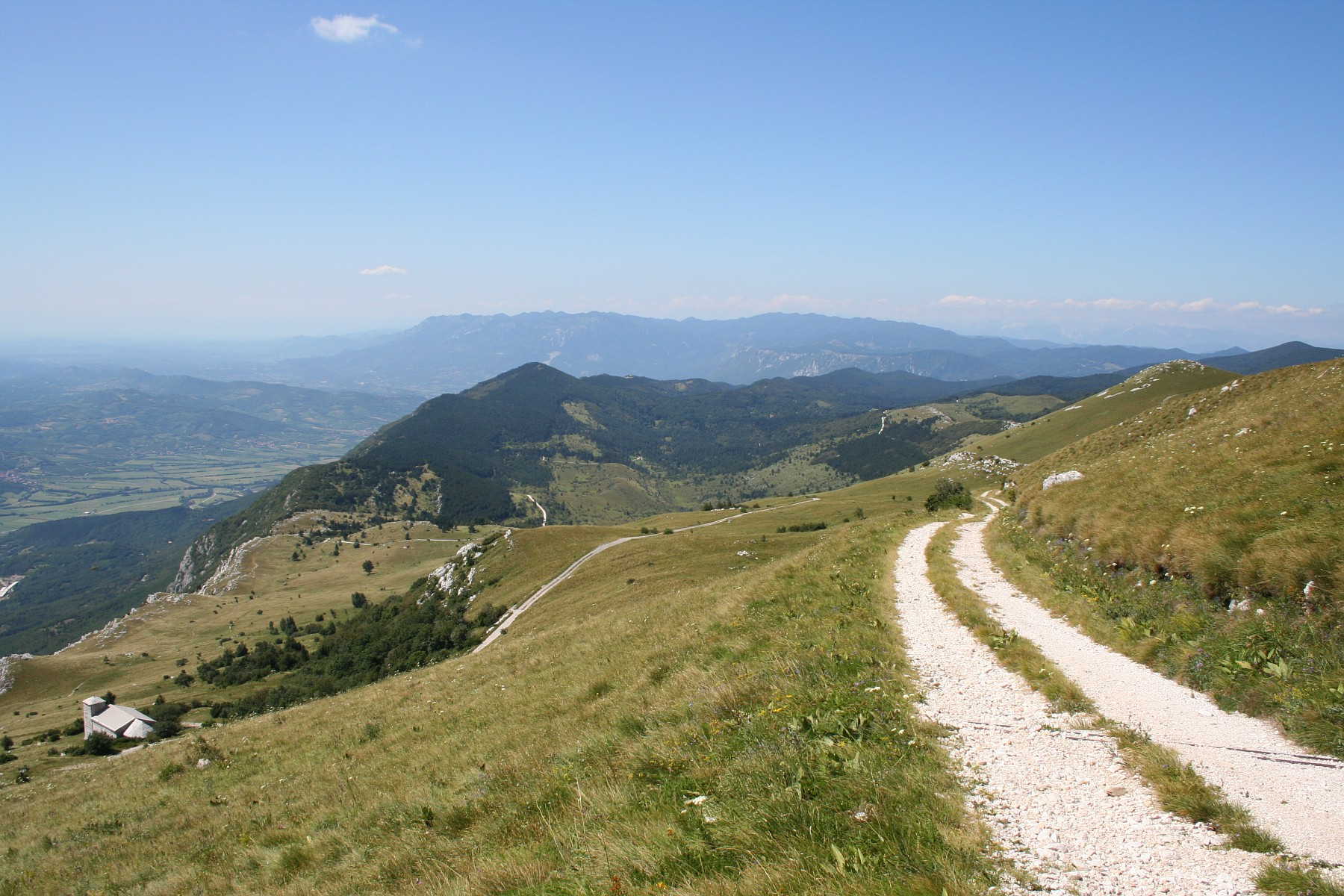
View of the Hrušica Plateau from Mount Nanos

Hrušica (pronounced [ˈxɾuːʃitsa]; German: Birnbaumer Wald [literally, 'pear tree forest'], Italian: Selva di Piro) is a plateau at the northern end of the Postojna Gate. The plateau can be viewed as the end or extension of the Trnovo Forest Plateau (Slovene: Trnovski gozd), and to the west is Mount Nanos. The limestone plateau reaches an elevation of 1,080 m, while the road crosses it at 883 m. Because the Postojna Gate is crossed at a lower point of 606 m at nearby Postojna, modern traffic including the railroad and the freeway bypass Hrušica. Hrušica was the location of an ancient Roman Fortress called Ad Pirum, which was part of the Claustra Alpium Iuliarum defence system.
