= Marica Brecelj =

Slovenian shop assistant and martyr (1914–1944)

- Born: Marica Brecelj; 25 April 1914; Žapuže
- Died: 12 July 1944 (aged 30); Dolanci
- Cause of death: Shooting
- Body discovered: Spodnja Branica
- Occupation: shop assistant
- Family: Angela Brecelj (sister)

Marica Brecelj (25 April 1914 – 12 July 1944) was a Slovenian shop assistant. She was a devout Catholic and was the head of the Sodality of the Virgin Mary in her parish. She was abducted and later killed by communists during World War II. She is considered a martyr by some.

== Childhood ==
Marica was born on 25 April 1914 into a Slovenian family in Žapuže. Her mother was the shopkeeper Emilija Brecelj (1887–1960), and her father was the master carpenter Jože Brecelj (1885–1944), the brother of the physician and politician Anton Brecelj. (Despite the same surname, it appears her parents were not related.) She was the eldest child. In 1916 her younger sister Angela Brecelj (1916–1944), also a shop assistant and martyr, was born. That same year her father was drafted into the army during World War I. While working in a workshop he lost an eye, but was not released from military service until the end of the war. After the war Marica had another sister, who died in childhood, and five brothers, among them Bogomil Brecelj (1925–2011), a priest that was engaged in cultural activities, and Martin Brecelj (1930–1944), a martyr.

Marica's family was very ethnically conscious. Her father participated in many cultural institutions. He was a member of the Lavrič Library and reading room, the Catholic Educational Society, the Craftsmen’s Association and hunting club, and the Orel gymnastics society, and he served in the municipal assembly.

After finishing elementary school, Marica became an apprentice in a shop in Ajdovščina.

== Work and Second World War ==
After completing her apprenticeship in Ajdovščina, Marica was employed in the same shop as a shop assistant. She worked at the cash register and remained employed there until her death.

She was an active member of the Sodality of Virgin Mary in Šturje and later also became its head. She prepared plays for children and youth, and coordinated annual Saint Nicholas events for children. The Italian Fascist authorities did not appreciate this. Once on May 1 when she and the girls from Sodality under her lead went on a hike to a nearby hill and cooked frittatas there, they were arrested and held in custody until the evening, accused of celebrating a Communist holiday.

When the Italian Fascist authorities, who oppressed Slovenians, imprisoned the Slovenian priest and writer Filip Terčelj, she visited him and brought care packages. She also prepared care packages for Slovenians imprisoned in the Gonars concentration camp and delivered them. When the Germans soldiers burned most of her village of Žapuže, she distributed many of her clothes to the victims.

== Kidnapping ==
On 8 July 1944, Marica and her family spent the whole day haymaking. At home that evening along with her were her mother, father, Angela, and Martin, who was still a child. After dark, a group of communist Partisans entered their house.

They searched the entire home, confiscated all anti-communist literature, and took all the livestock. The family sat at the table waiting. The Partisans ordered them all to come for interrogation. The family managed to plead for their mother to stay behind, but the Partisans did not allow Martin, though only thirteen, to remain with his mother. They said he would help them find the way.

Meanwhile, another group went to Marica's uncle's house, where they shot her cousin, who cried for help, killing her instantly. Fearing the gunshot had alerted Germans nearby, they withdrew, taking with them Marica, her father Jože, her sister Angela, and her youngest brother Martin.

It is assumed that Marica and the others were alive for several days after their abduction. Witnesses saw them being moved. They were hidden by day and led around the valley by night. They were first taken across Lokavec along the slopes of Čaven to Stomaž, then down to Cesta. They were last seen in Velike Žablje. After that, they vanished without trace.

== Death ==
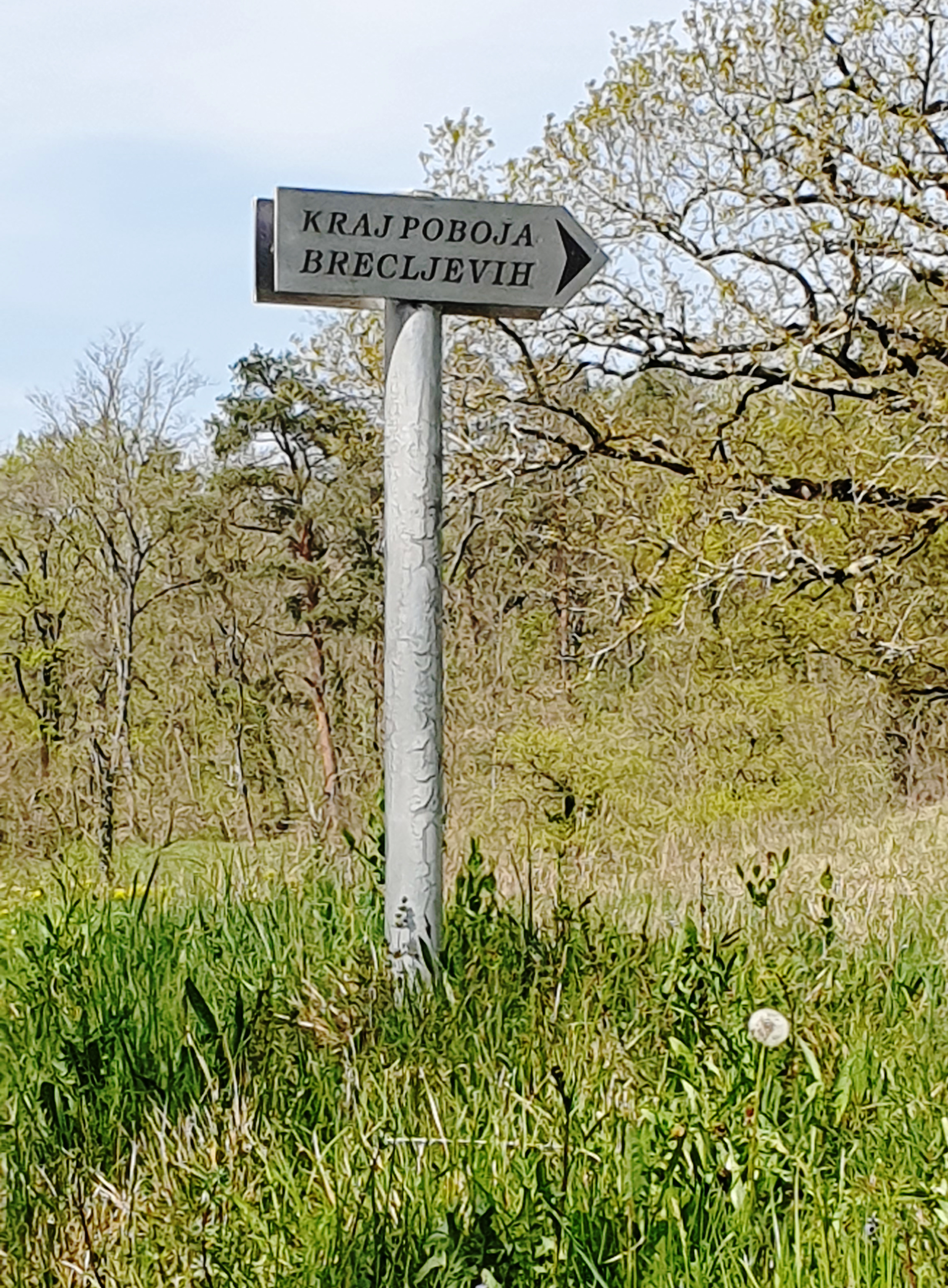
Sign for the site where the Breceljs were killed

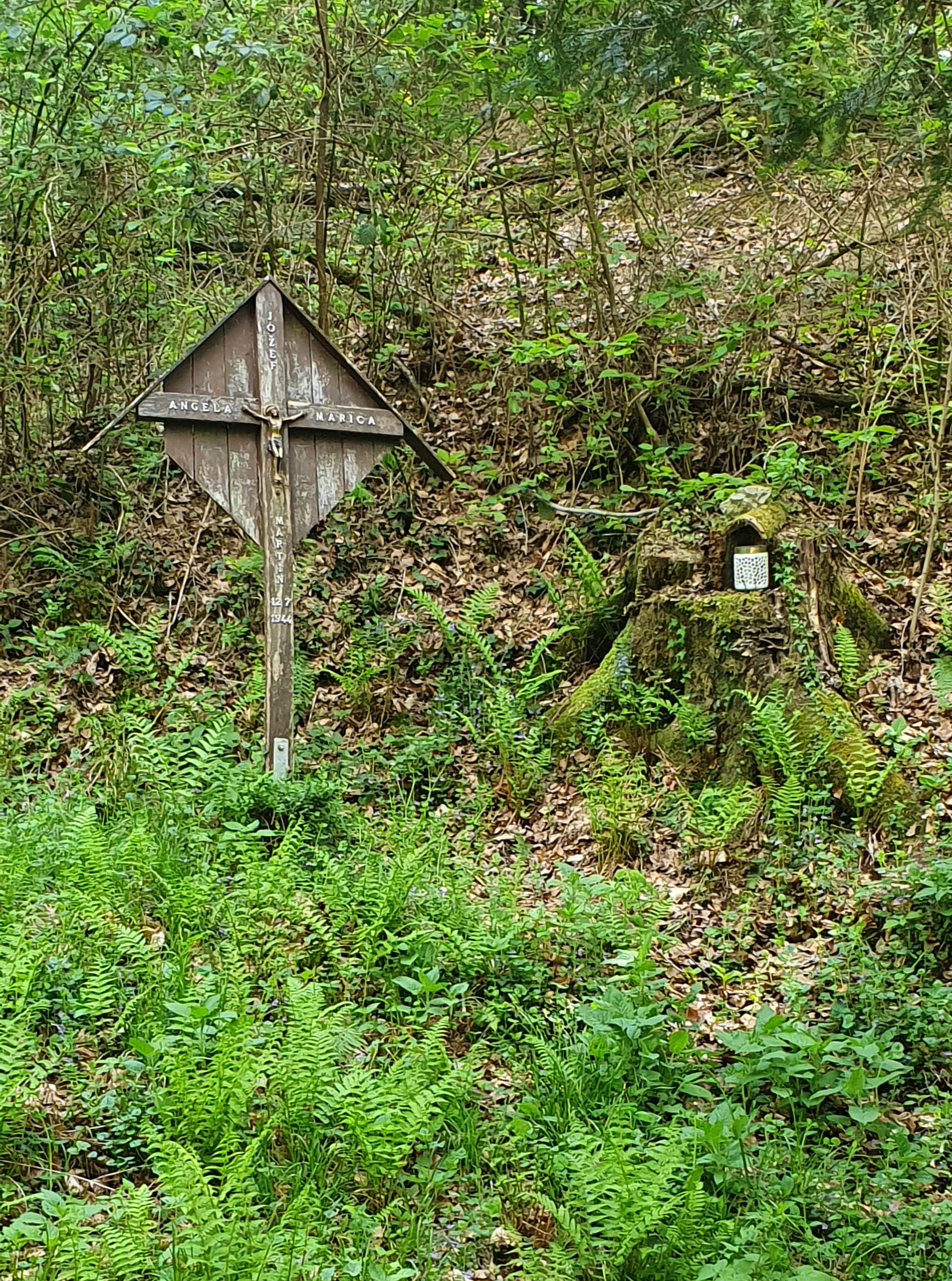
The site where the Breceljs were killed

Weeks later, Marica's mother was summoned by Partisans to Erzelj with instructions to bring food and clothing for her relatives, which she did. At the command post, they took the supplies and promised to deliver them. Later, Marica's mother heard that some girls had been seen on Planina wearing Marica's and Angela's clothes.

After nine months of fruitless searching and inquiries, Marica's mother and surviving brothers learned that Marica and her father, sister, and brother had been murdered and then buried in Spodnja Branica. Their bodies were found under a shallow layer of earth and leaves. Jože and Martin lay on top, with Marica and Angela beneath. Marica had a small bag around her neck containing a gold watch and documents. Their remains were transported on a manure cart to Šturje. The autopsy revealed that Marica, Angela, and Martin had been shot, and that their father had been beaten to death.

Witnesses later testified that Marica was killed together with her relatives on 12 July 1944 in the Branica Valley. They said she was shot twice. After the first shot she cried out, "Jesus, this is for you!" The second shot killed her. A signpost, labeled Kraj poboja Brecljevih 'Site where the Breceljs were killed', stands along the road in Dolanci.
