= Angela Brecelj =

Slovenian shop assistant and martyr (1916–1944)

- Born: Angela Brecelj; October 7, 1916; Žapuže, Austria-Hungary (now Slovenia)
- Died: 12 July 1944; Dolanci
- Cause of death: Shooting
- Body discovered: Spodnja Branica
- Occupation: shop assistant
- Family: Marica Brecelj (sister)

Angela Brecelj (7 October 1916 – 12 July 1944) was a Slovenian shop assistant. She was a devout Catholic who was abducted and later killed by communists during World War II. She is considered a martyr by some.

== Childhood ==
Angela was born on 7 October 1916 into a Slovenian family in Žapuže. Her mother was the shopkeeper Emilija Brecelj (1887–1960), and her father was the master carpenter Jože Brecelj (1885–1944), a brother of the physician and politician Anton Brecelj. (Despite the same surname, it appears her parents were not related.)

She was the second child, with an elder sister Marica Brecelj (1914–1944), a shop assistant and martyr. During Angela's birth year, her father was drafted into the army in World War I. While working in a workshop he lost an eye, but he was not released from military service until the war ended. After the war the family had another daughter, who died in childhood, and five sons, among them Bogomil Brecelj (1925–2011), a priest that was also involved in the arts, and Martin Brecelj (1930–1944), a martyr.

Angela's family was strongly patriotic. Her father participated in many cultural institutions. He was a member of the Lavrič Library and reading room, the Catholic Educational Society, the Craftsmen's Association and hunting club, and the Orel gymnastics society, and he served in the municipal assembly.

== Work ==
After elementary school, Angela attended a cooking course run by the School Sisters of St. Francis of Christ the King in Tomaj. After completing the course, she worked as a shop assistant in her mother's store, where she remained employed until her death. She also looked after her five younger brothers, ensuring they completed their chores. On Sundays, she helped her sister Marica, who was the head of the Sodality of Virgin Mary in Šturje coordinating stage plays for children and youth. The Italian Fascist authorities did not appreciate the work of girls from Sodality. Once on May 1, when she, Marica, and the other girls from Sodality went on a hike to a nearby hill and cooked frittatas there, they were arrested and held in custody until the evening, accused of celebrating a Communist holiday.

== Kidnapping ==
On 8 July 1944, Angela and her family spent the day haymaking. At home that evening along with her were her mother, father, sister Marica, and brother Martin, still a child. After nightfall, a group of communist Partisans entered the house.

They searched the home, confiscated anti-communist literature, and seized the livestock. The family sat at the table waiting. The Partisans ordered them all to come for interrogation. The family managed to plead for the mother to remain at home, but the Partisans did not allow Martin, despite him being only thirteen, to remain with his mother. The Partisans said he would help them find the way.

Another group of Partisans went to Angela's uncle's home, where they shot her cousin, who had cried for help, killing her instantly. Fearing the gunshot had alerted Germans nearby, the Partisans withdrew, taking with them Angela, her father Jože, her sister Marica, and her youngest brother Martin.

Witnesses reported that Angela and the others were alive for several days after the abduction. Witnesses saw them being moved. They were hidden during the day and moved around the valley at night. They were seen passing Lokavec along the slopes of Čaven to Stomaž, then descending to Cesta. They were last seen in Velike Žablje. After that, they vanished without a trace.

== Death ==
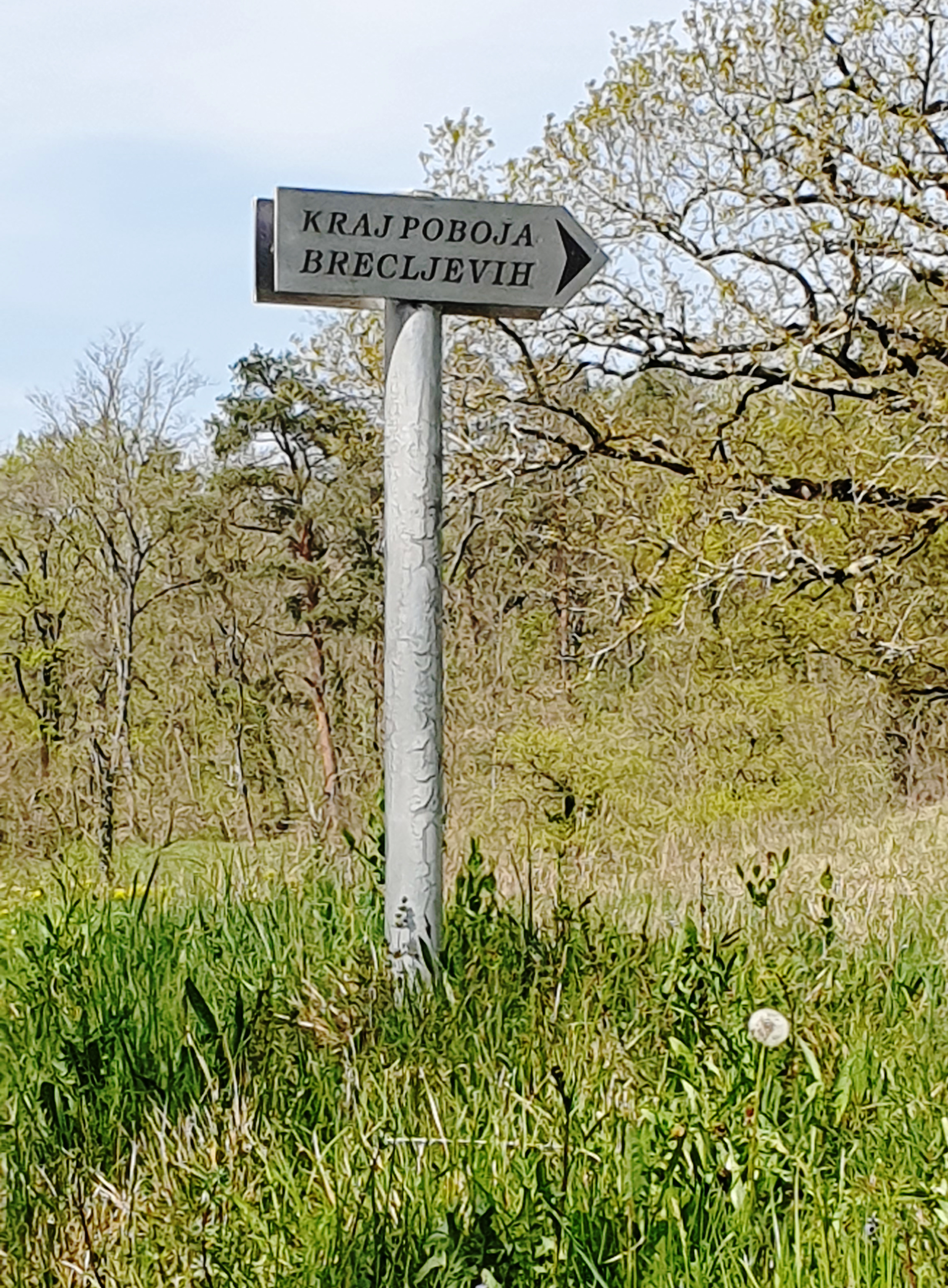
Sign for the site where the Breceljs were killed

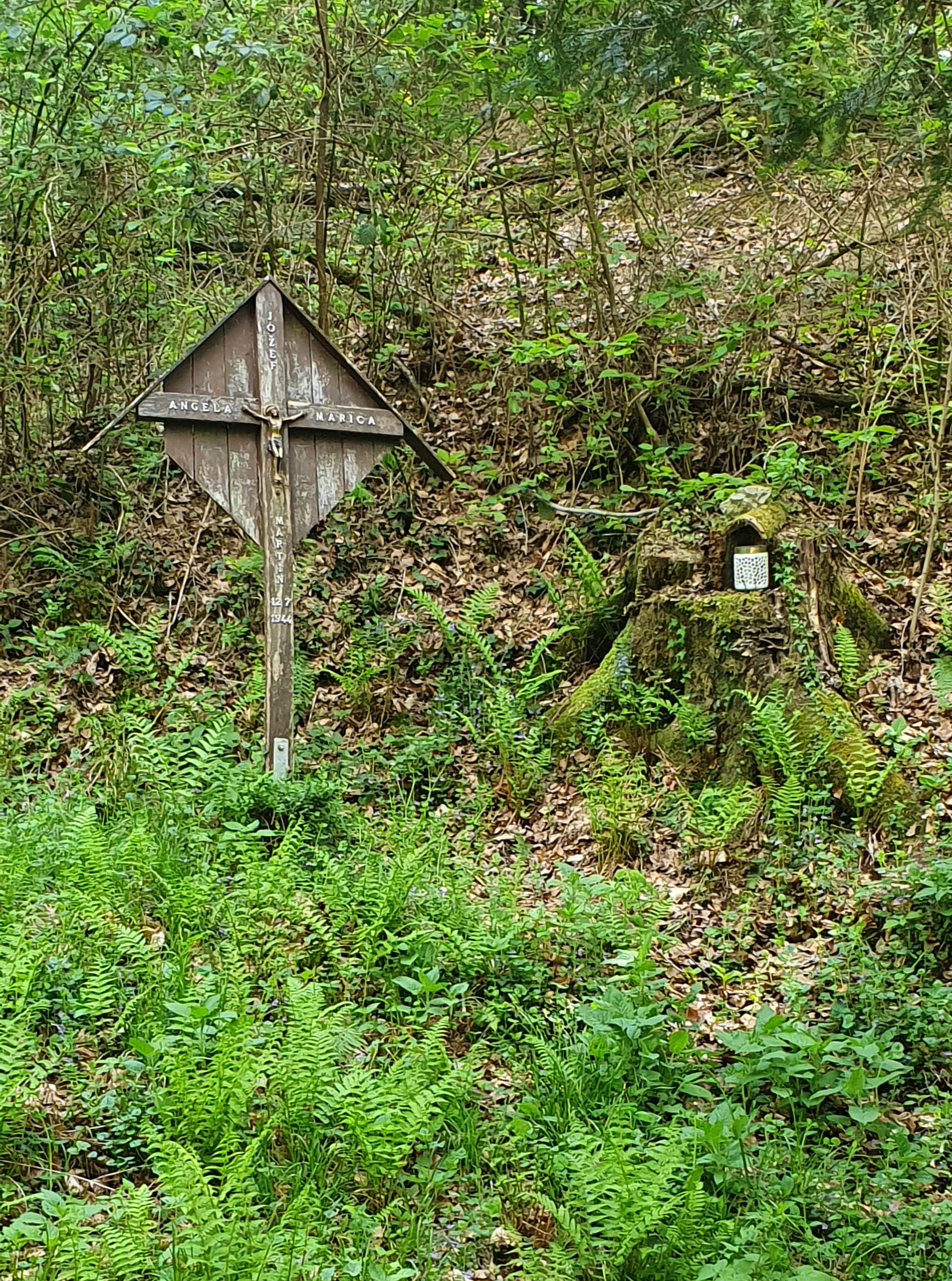
The site where the Breceljs were killed

Weeks later, Angela's mother was summoned to Erzelj with instructions to bring food and clothes for her relatives, which she did. At the command post, they took the supplies and promised to deliver them. Later, she learned of witnesses who had seen girls in Planina wearing Angela's and Marica's clothes.

After nine months of unsuccessful searching, Angela's mother and surviving brothers learned that Angela and her father, sister, and brother had been killed and then buried in Spodnja Branica. Their bodies were found under a thin layer of earth and leaves: Jože and Martin on top, with Angela and Marica beneath. Marica had a small purse around her neck containing a gold watch and documents. Their remains were taken on a manure cart to Šturje. The autopsy revealed that Angela, Marica, and Martin had been shot, and that their father had been beaten to death.

Witnesses later stated that Angela was killed with her family on 12 July 1944 in the Branica Valley. They said she was first beaten, thrown alive into a pit, and then shot. A signpost, labeled Kraj poboja Brecljevih 'Site where the Breceljs were killed', stands along the road in Dolanci.
