= Žapuže =

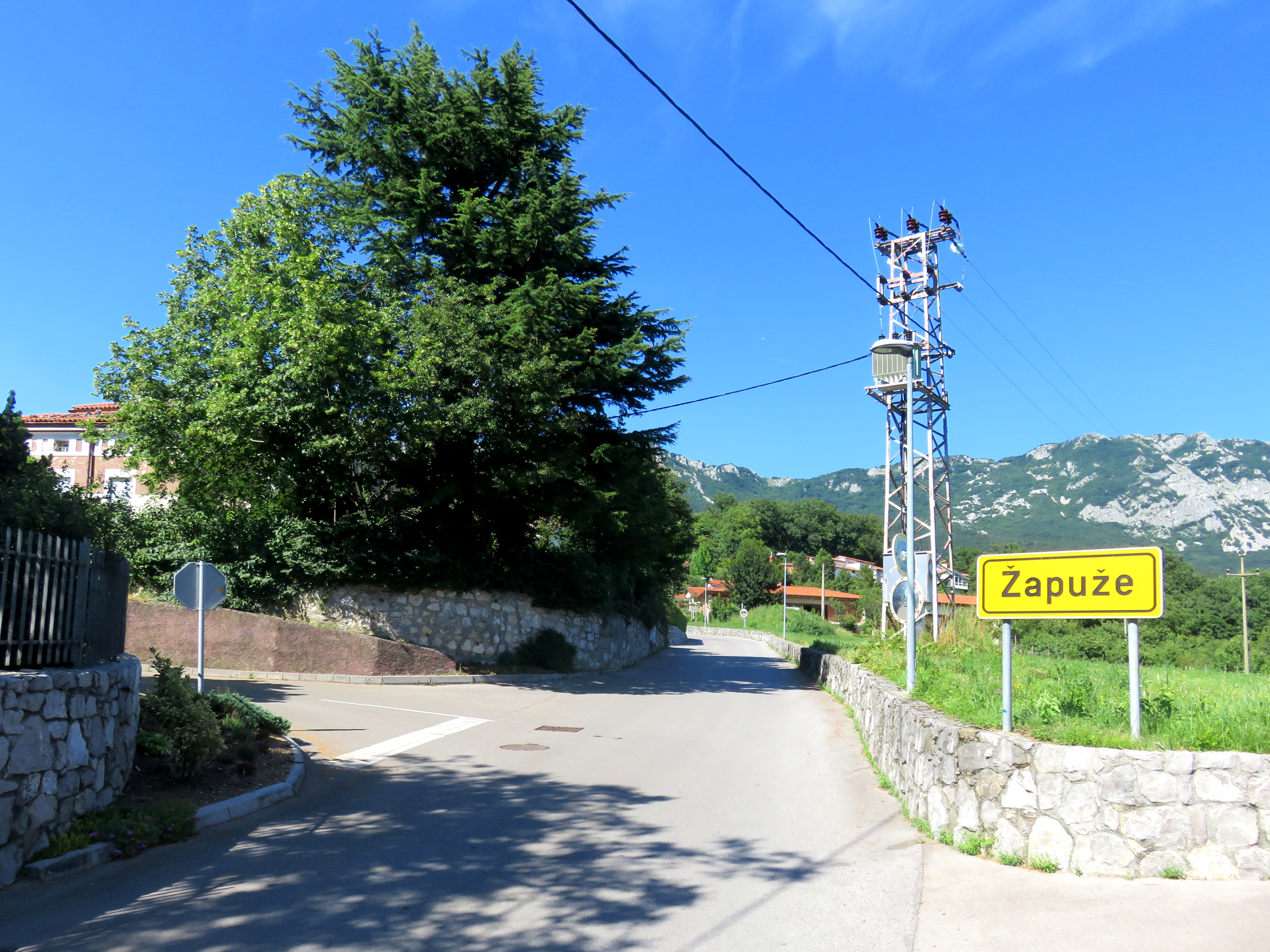

- Location in Slovenia
- Coordinates: 45°52′49.6″N 13°55′7.37″E
- Country: Slovenia
- Traditional region: Littoral
- Statistical region: Gorizia
- Municipality: Ajdovščina

Area
  - Total: 1.79 km^{2} (0.69 sq mi)
- Elevation: 128.3 m (421 ft)

Population (2020)
  - Total: 323
  - Density: 180/km^{2} (467/sq mi)

Žapuže (pronounced [ˈʒaːpuʒɛ]) is a settlement on the southeastern outskirts of Ajdovščina in the Littoral region of Slovenia.

== History ==
The village was burned down by the German Army on 22 June 1944.

== Church ==
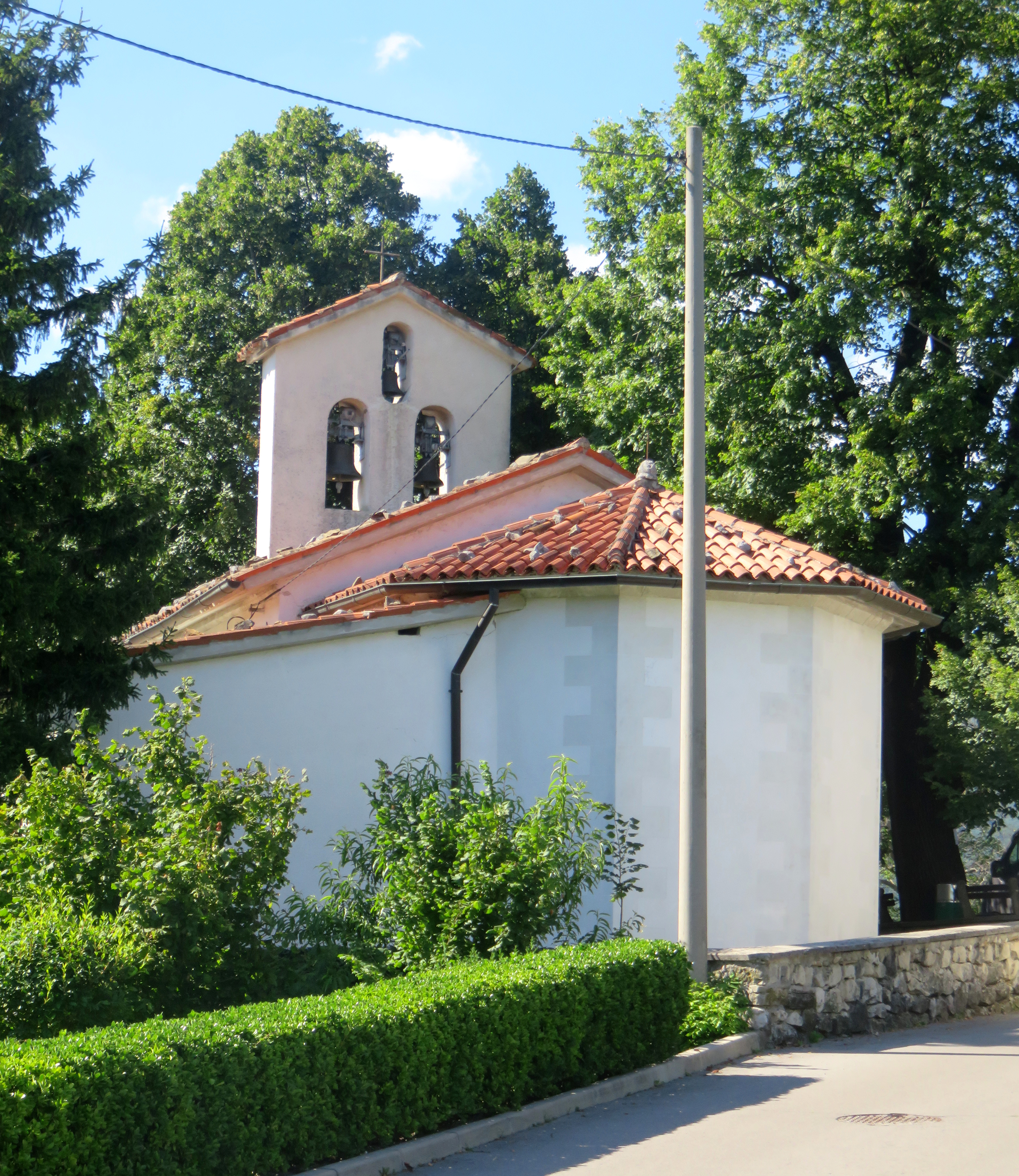
View from the southeast

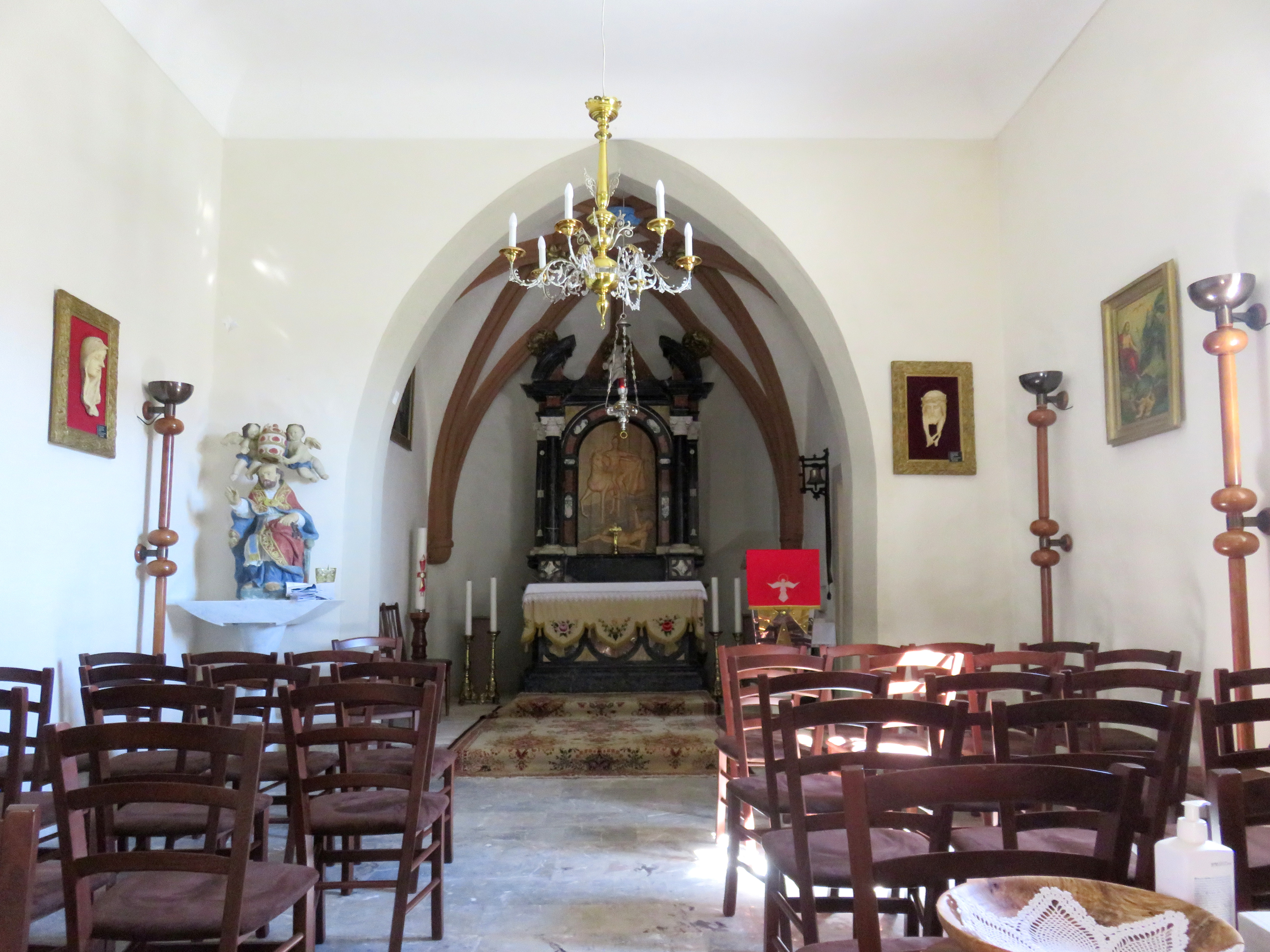
Interior

Saint Martin's Church

The local church, renovated in 1989, is dedicated to Saint Peter, but it is known as Saint Martin's Church and belongs to the Parish of Šturje.

== Notable people ==
- Marica Brecelj (1914–1944), Slovenian shop assistant and martyr
- Angela Brecelj (1916–1944), Slovenian shop assistant and martyr
