= Vipava =

Vipava may refer to:

- Municipality of Vipava, in southwestern Slovenia
  - Vipava, Vipava, a town in the municipality
  - Vipava Castle, near the town
  - NK Vipava, a football club in Vipava
- Vipava (river), in Slovenia and Italy
- Vipava Valley, valley of the Vipava in southwestern Slovenia
