= Dolenje, Ajdovščina =

Dolenje
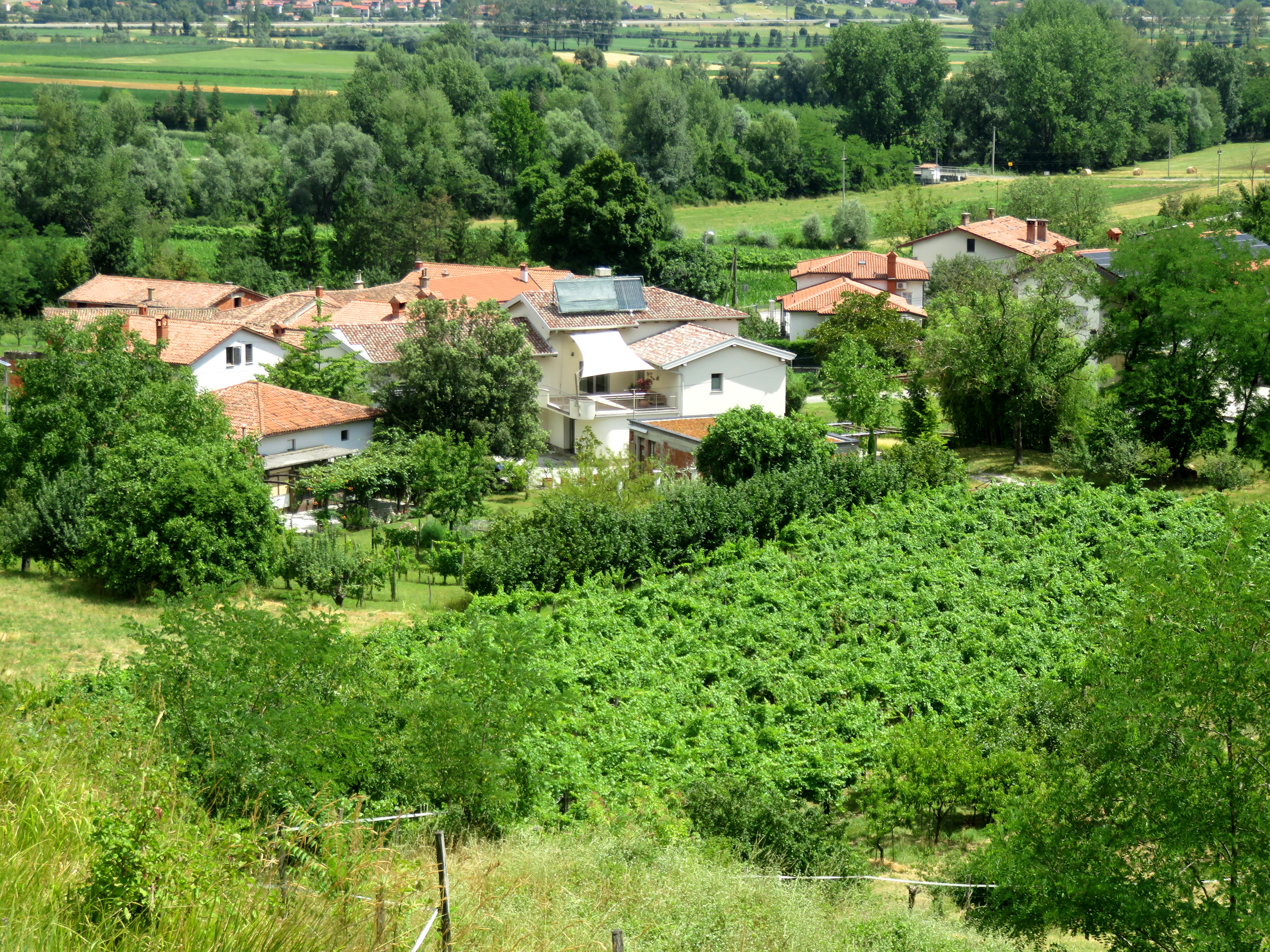

- Location in Slovenia
- Coordinates: 45°51′52.75″N 13°54′16.08″E
- Country: Slovenia
- Traditional region: Littoral
- Statistical region: Gorizia
- Municipality: Ajdovščina

Area
  - Total: 1.14 km^{2} (0.44 sq mi)
- Elevation: 97 m (318 ft)

Population (2020)
  - Total: 94

Dolenje (pronounced [dɔˈleːnjɛ]) is a village on the left bank of the Vipava River in the Municipality of Ajdovščina in the Littoral region of Slovenia.

== Church ==
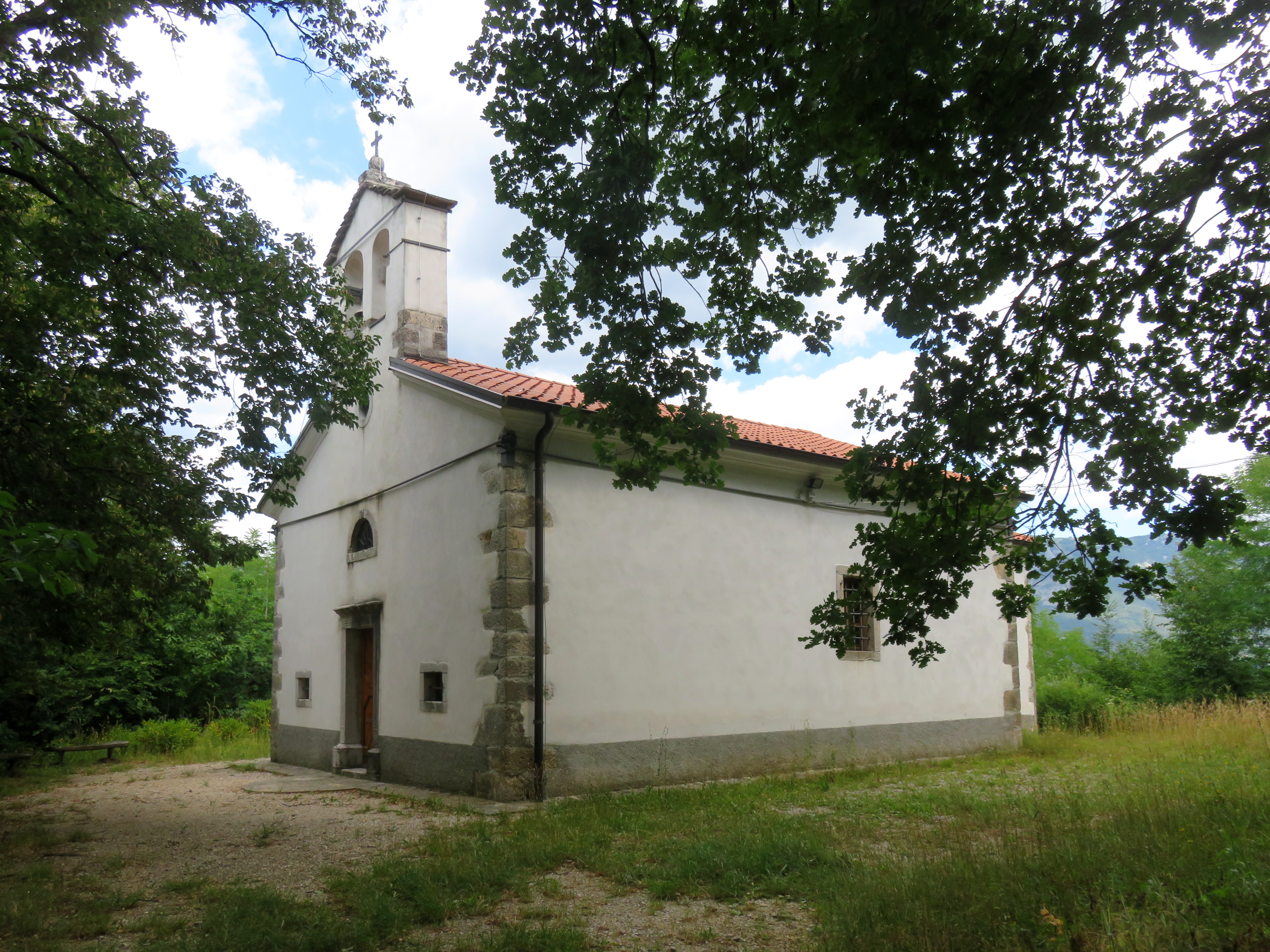
Saint Margaret's Church

The local church is dedicated to Saint Margaret and belongs to the Parish of Planina. The church stands on a rise south of the village. It is a single-nave structure with a chancel with three bays. The nave is wider and taller than the chancel, and there is a bell gable over the entrance. The chancel dates from the 16th century and is rib vaulted, and the nave was built in 1646.

== Stone arch bridge ==
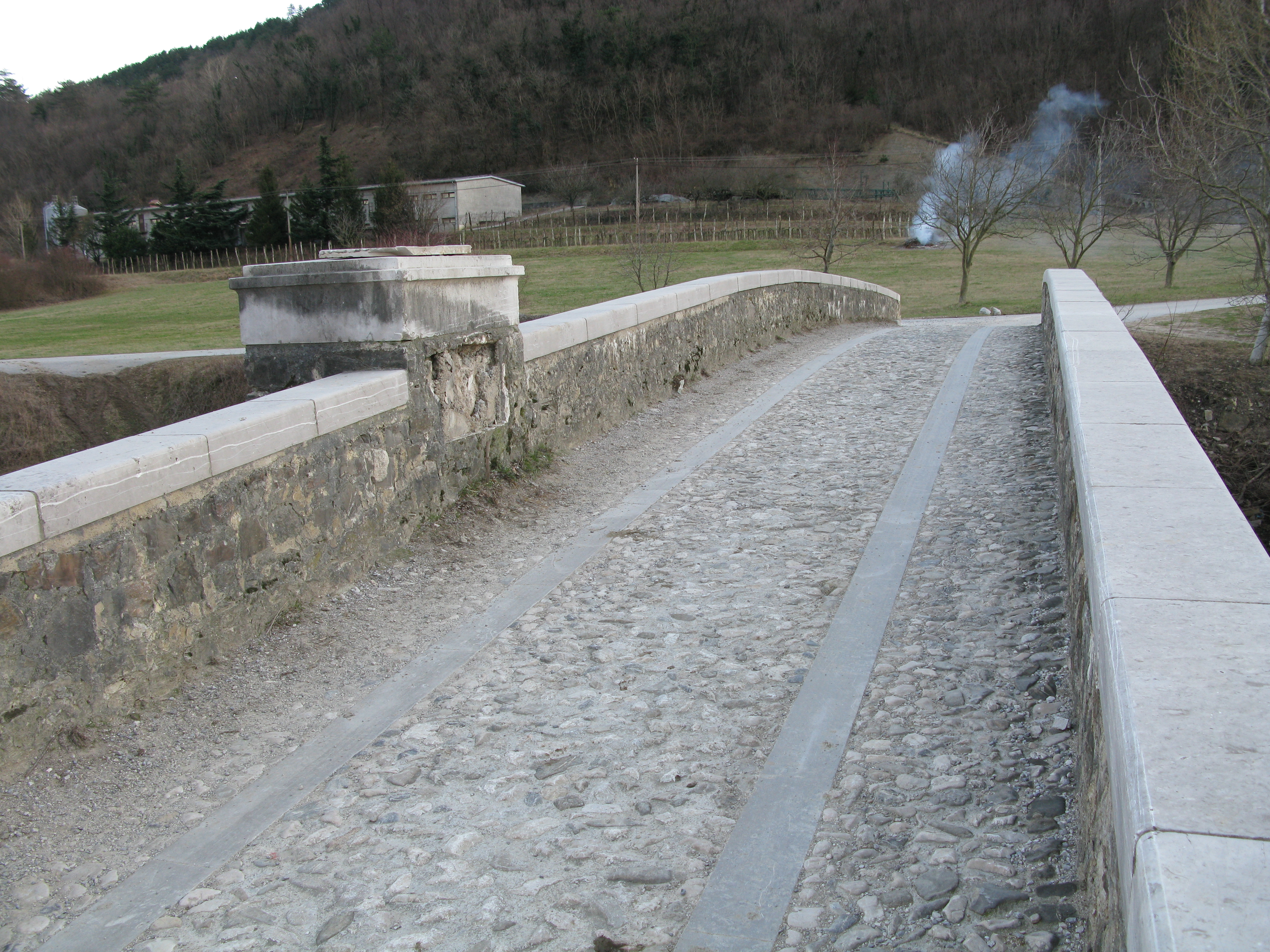
The stone arch bridge over the Vipava River, viewed from Dolga Poljana towards Dolenje

A stone arch bridge over the Vipava River links Dolenje to the village of Dolga Poljana. The three-arch bridge was built in the 19th century. It is paved with gravel and supported by buttresses that are reinforced with groynes on the upstream side. There is a low stone wall on both sides of the bridge, and a shrine with a semi-circular niche once stood at it.
