= Slano Blato Landslide =

Periodic landslide in Slovenia

Coordinates: 45°54′47″N 13°51′55″E

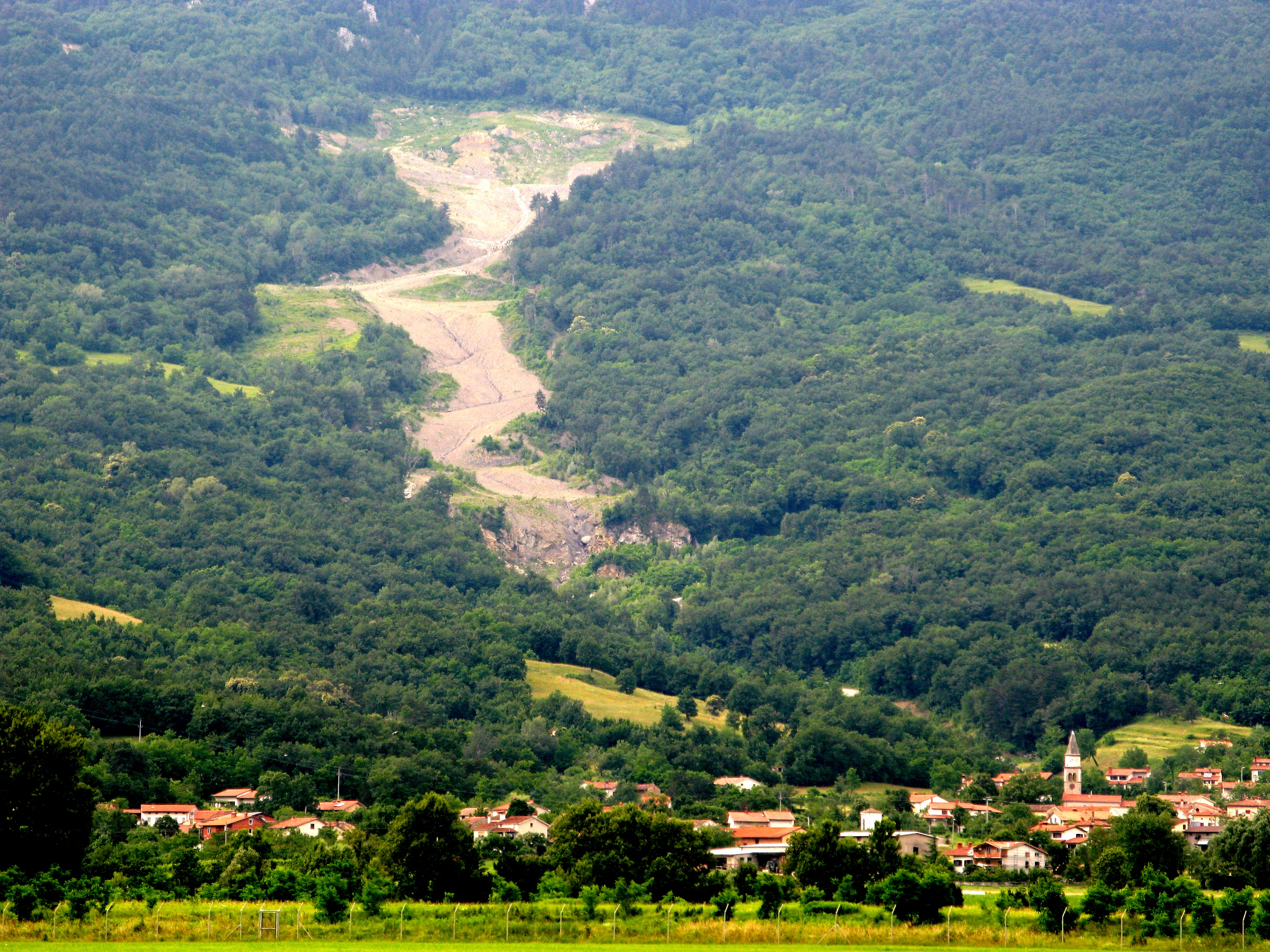
Slano Blato Landslide above Lokavec (2008)

The Slano Blato Landslide (Slovene: plaz Slano blato), or the Salt Mud Slide, is a periodic landslide in Slovenia that is triggered approximately once a century. Although around 8,000 active landslides are present in Slovenia, the Slano Blato Landslide stands out as one of the most serious in terms of the damage it has caused.

The landslide is located on the southern edge of the Trnovo Plateau of the Dinaric Alps, below Mount Čaven and Little Mountain (Mala gora) next to the Platna mountain pasture. It is moving along Grajšček Creek (which also originates in the landslide itself) toward the settlement of Lokavec near Ajdovščina. It is 1,010 to 1,300 metres (3,310 to 4,270 ft) long and 60 to 250 m (200 to 820 ft) wide, covering approximately 15 hectares (37 acres) between the elevations of 360 and 660 m (1,180 and 2,170 ft). Its maximum flow rate was recorded at 100 m (330 ft)/day.

== Name ==
The name of the landslide area was recorded as Blatna ('muddy') in 1881. The origin of the designation 'salt(y)' (Slovene slan) is uncertain. A local folk belief states that the high cleanup cost of the landslide resulted in an exorbitant cost (cf. Slovene zasoliti 'to over-salt'; metaphorically, 'to charge excessively'). However, the landslide bore the designation 'salt(y)' before any cleanup efforts were ever made.

Other locals state that sheep used to wander down to the area from nearby pastures, where they would lick the mud as a natural salt lick. This basis for the name's origin is supported by the fact that chemical analysis of the water at the landslide has shown it to have a very high mineral content, including sodium sulfate, also known as Glauber's salt.

== History and activity ==
Oral tradition regarding the landslide goes back four centuries, connecting it to the construction of a small church dedicated to Saint Urban on the slope of Mount Čaven above Lokavec and below the landslide. Saint Urban was invoked as a protector against natural disasters, and particularly with regard to a lake that people believed was hidden inside Mount Čaven that threatened to flood the valley.

A 1789 source by Belsazar Hacquet mentioned the landslide, describing its debris flow in 1786. It was described again in an 1887 report that discussed the landslide event of 20 October 1885, in which 30 m of the road from Ajdovščina to Gorizia was destroyed. Cleanup efforts and landslide mitigation measures were carried out by Austrian authorities in 1903.

In November 2000, heavy rain and warm weather triggered the Slano Blato Landslide, which buried about 15 hectares (37 acres) of grassland and forest. A secondary flow was triggered in September 2001. The landslide stopped moving after this and is currently considered stable. Following these events, an access road was built and 230,000 m^{3} (8,100,000 cu ft) of material was removed from the lower part of the landslide and deposited north of the Ajdovščina Airport.
