= Slokarji =

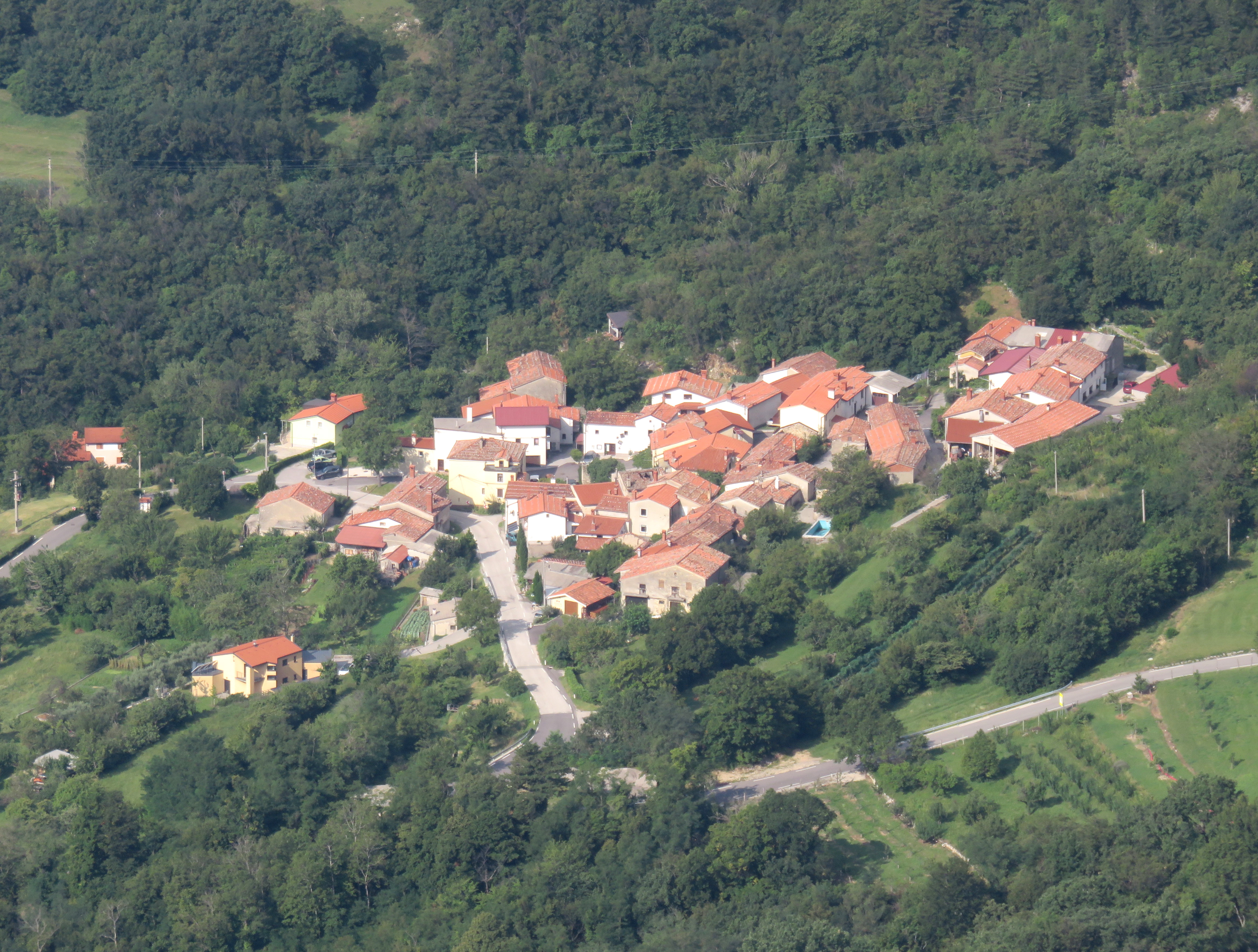

- Location in Slovenia
- Coordinates: 45°54′53″N 13°53′28″E
- Country: Slovenia
- Traditional region: Littoral
- Statistical region: Gorizia
- Municipality: Ajdovščina
- Elevation: 220 m (720 ft)

Slokarji (pronounced [ˈsloːkaɾji]; Italian: Slocari) is a formerly independent settlement in the Municipality of Ajdovščina in southwestern Slovenia. It is now part of the village of Lokavec. It is part of the traditional region of the Littoral and is now included with the rest of the municipality in the Gorizia Statistical Region.

== Geography ==
Slokarji lies north of the main settlement of Lokavec, along the road to Predmeja.

== History ==
Slokarji had a population of 131 people living in 28 houses in 1880, 120 in 30 houses in 1890, and 133 in 27 houses in 1910. Slokarji was annexed by Lokavec in 1952, ending its existence as an independent settlement.

== Notable people ==
Notable people that were born or lived in Slokarji include the following:

- Edmund Čibej (1861–1954), journalist and mineralogist
- Venceslav Čopič (1893–1980), teacher and writer
- Teodor Postelj (1900–1993), cardiologist
- Anton Slokar (1898–1982), politician
