= Trilek Castle =

Coordinates: 45°52′54.63″N 13°59′21.57″E

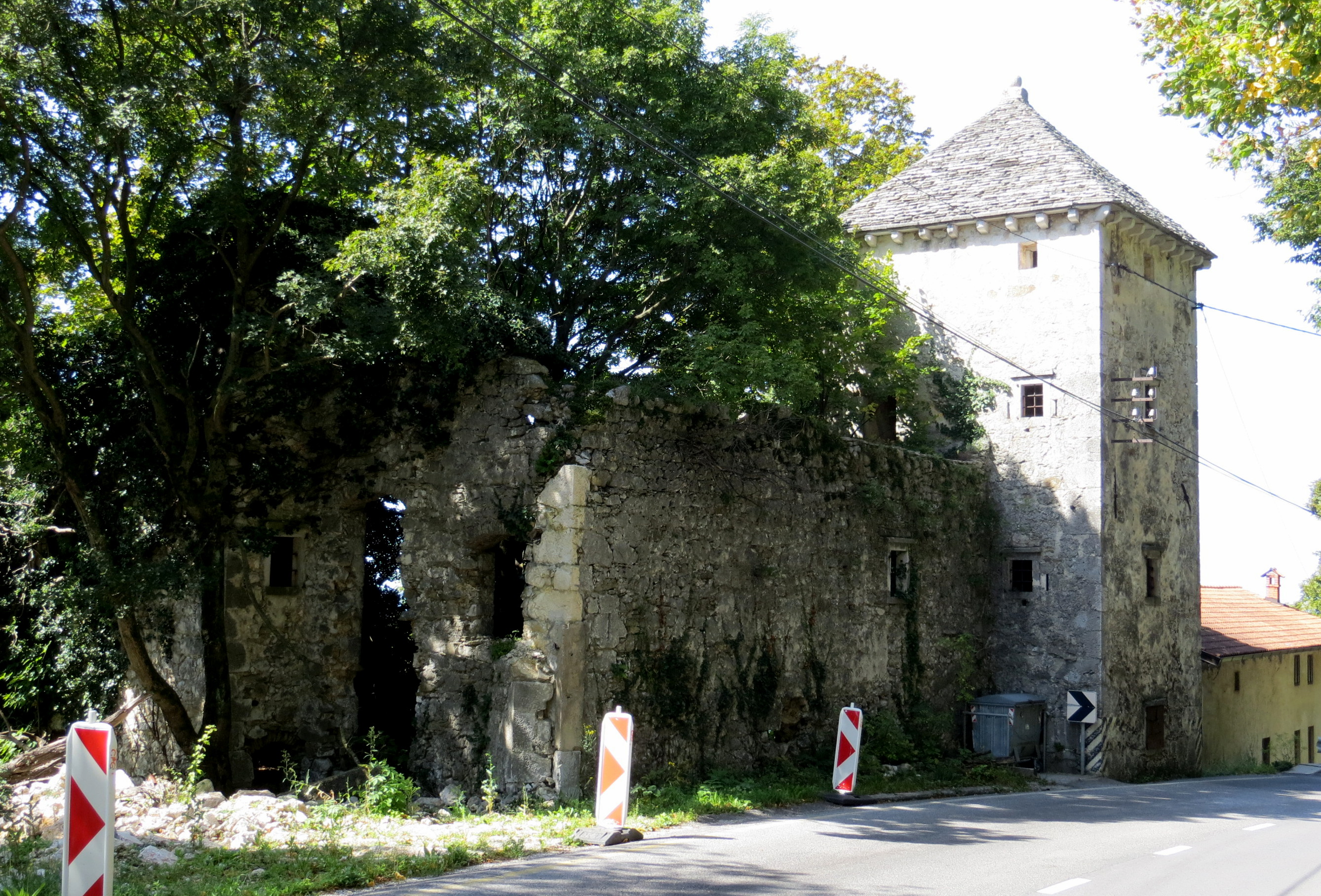
Trilek Castle in 2014

Trilek Castle (Slovene: Grad Trilek or Graščina Trilek), also known as Old Castle (Slovene: Stari grad), is a small castle or fort in the settlement of Col, in the Municipality of Ajdovščina in southwest Slovenia. Built in the early 16th century, it was first mentioned in the 17th-century historian Johann Weikhard von Valvasor's 1689 survey The Glory of the Duchy of Carniola.

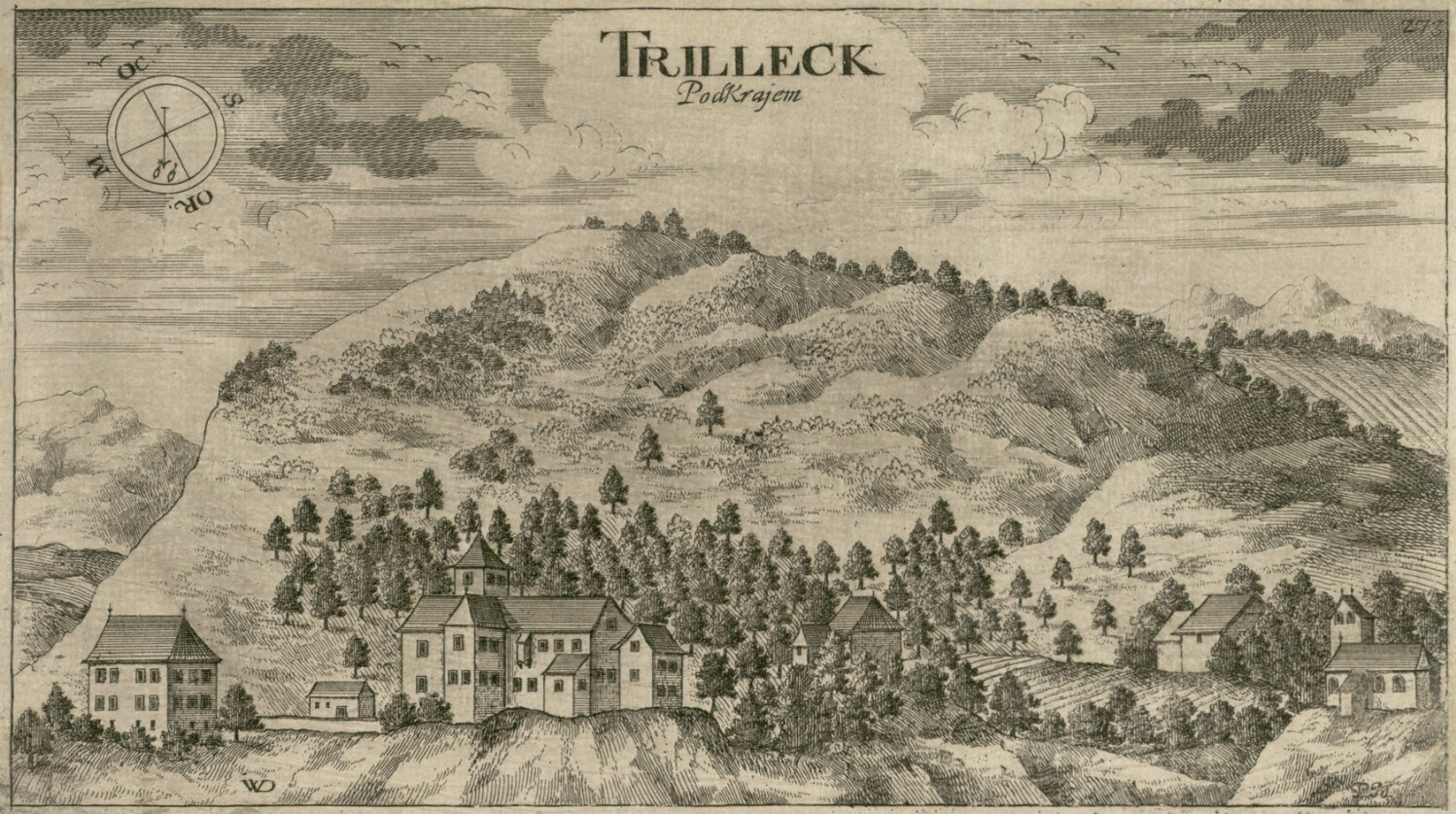
Engraving of Trilek Castle by Valvasor (1679)

The castle consists of a small tower and two annexes. Although generally intact, it is in poor condition and unsafe to enter due to instability of the ceilings and walls.

A tower and part of castle's enceinte remain. The castle was owned by the Abramsberg noble family, which lived in Šturje. A stone Roman milestone with a dedication to Julian the Apostate was discovered in the castle in the 19th century; the milestone is now kept at the National Museum of Slovenia in Ljubljana. Roman coins dating to the second century AD were also found at the castle, and it was later used for defensive purposes against Ottoman attacks.

== Sources ==
- Media related to Trilek Castle at Wikimedia Commons
- Trillek Association - Society for the Preservation of Old Traditions
