= Vipava Castle =

Ruined castle in southwestern Slovenia

Coordinates: 45°51′1.81″N 13°57′51.51″E

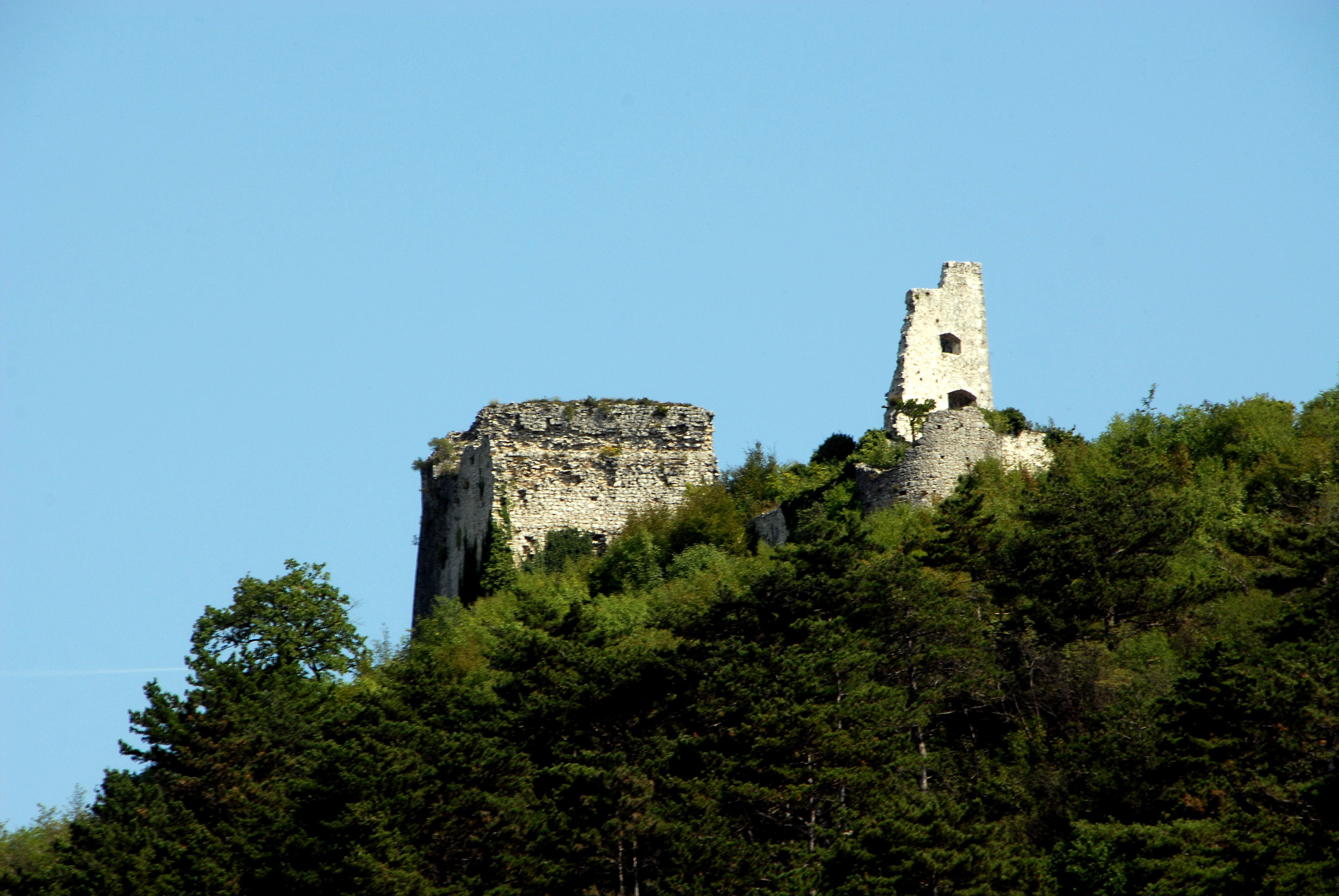
View of Vipava Castle

Vipava Castle (Slovene: Grad Vipava, German: Schloss Alt Wippach) is a castle ruin above the town of Vipava in the Municipality of Vipava in southwestern Slovenia.

== History ==
Built by the Patriarchate of Aquileia, the castle was first recorded in 1275 as Castrum Wipaci superioris. It was the residence of the knights of Vipava until the mid-14th century, when it became a ducal fief, granted to a long series of noble and knightly families, including the knights of Rihemberk, lords of Snežnik and Weissenfels, Counts of Celje, barons Herberstein, Counts Thurn, the noble family of Edling, counts Thrillegkh, and finally the counts Lanthieri, who abandoned the decaying castle in the 17th century.

The ruins of the Romanesque structure trace the rectangular layout of its thick walls, enclosing two residential buildings guarded by an impressive defensive tower.

== Sources ==
- Jakič, Ivan: Vsi slovenski gradovi: leksikon slovenske grajske zapuščine (All Slovenian Castles: An Encyclopedia of Slovene Castle Heritage). Ljubljana, 1997.
- Photos at gradovi.jesenice.net
