= Dolga Poljana =

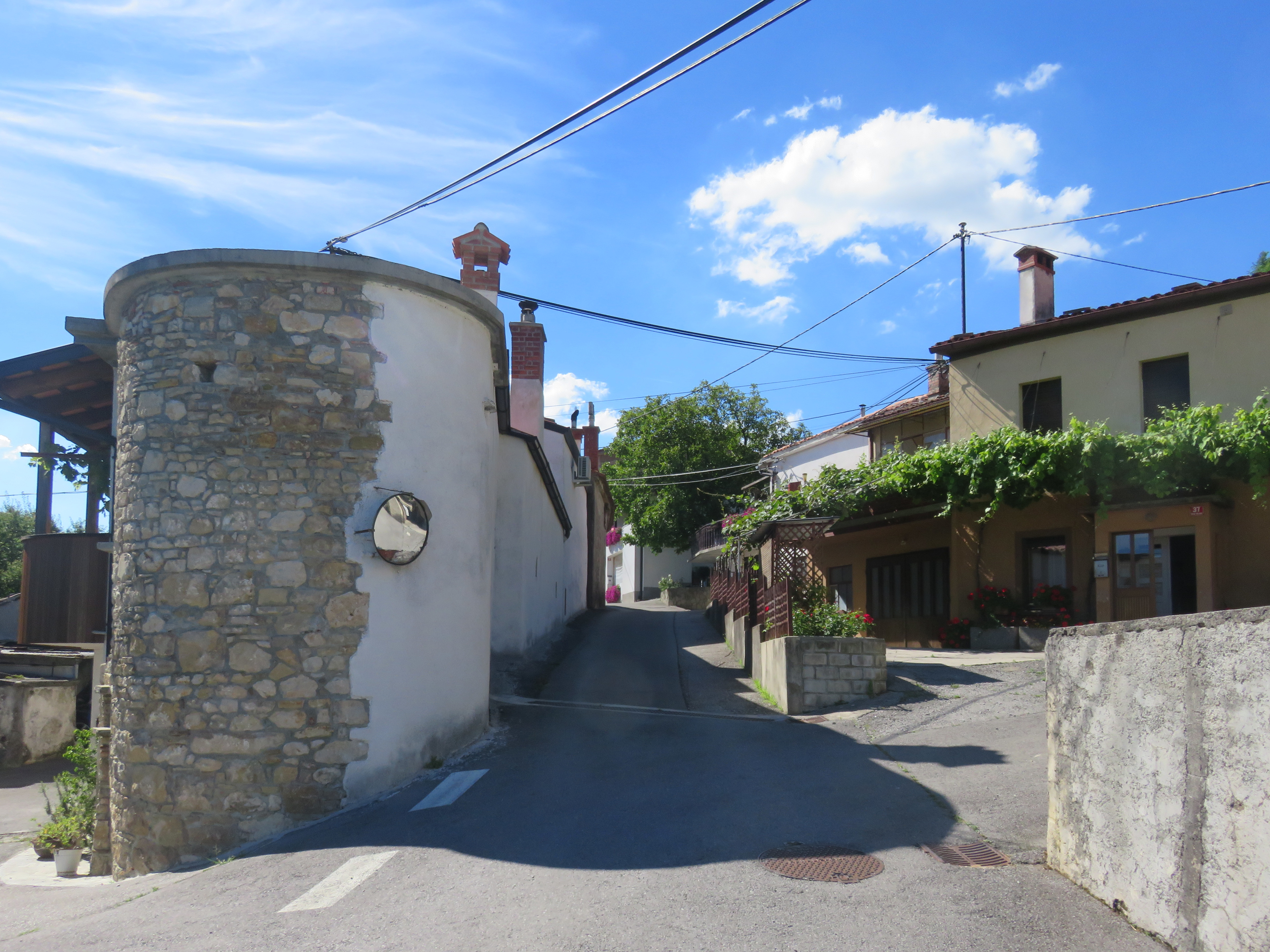

- Location in Slovenia
- Coordinates: 45°52′33.34″N 13°56′9.37″E
- Country: Slovenia
- Traditional region: Inner Carniola
- Statistical region: Gorizia
- Municipality: Ajdovščina

Area
  - Total: 2.31 km^{2} (0.89 sq mi)
- Elevation: 155.8 m (511 ft)

Population (2020)
  - Total: 381

Dolga Poljana (pronounced [ˈdoːu̯ɡa pɔˈljaːna], German: Langenfeld) is a village in the Vipava Valley east of Ajdovščina in the traditional Inner Carniola region of Slovenia. It is now generally regarded as part of the Slovenian Littoral.

== Stone arch bridge ==
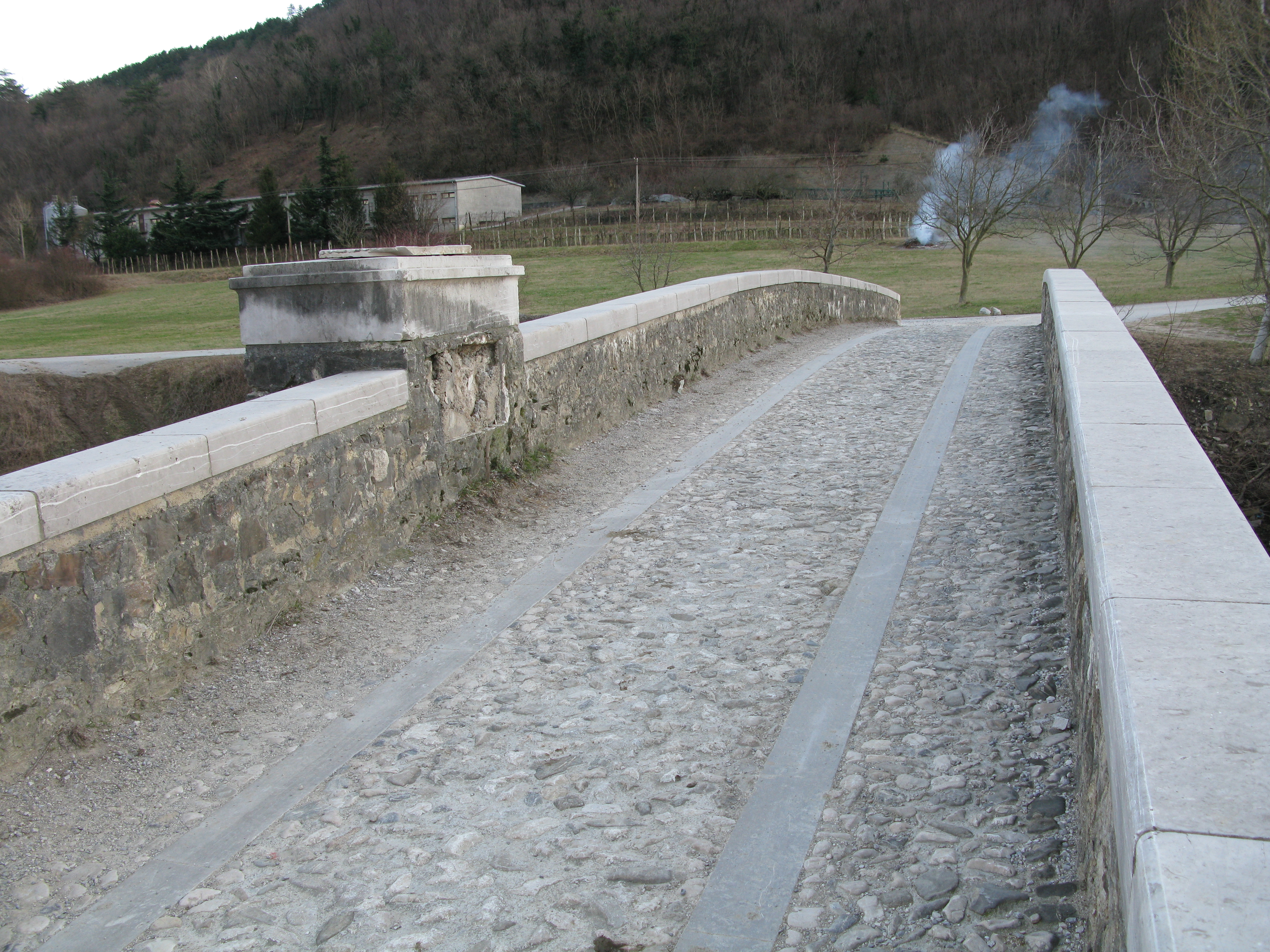
The stone arch linking Dolga Poljana over the Vipava River to Dolenje

A stone arch bridge over the Vipava River links Dolga Poljana to the village of Dolenje. The three-arch bridge was built in the 19th century. It is paved with gravel and is supported by buttresses that are reinforced with groynes on the upstream side. There is a low stone wall on both sides of the bridge, and a shrine with a semi-circular niche once stood at it.
