= Čaven =

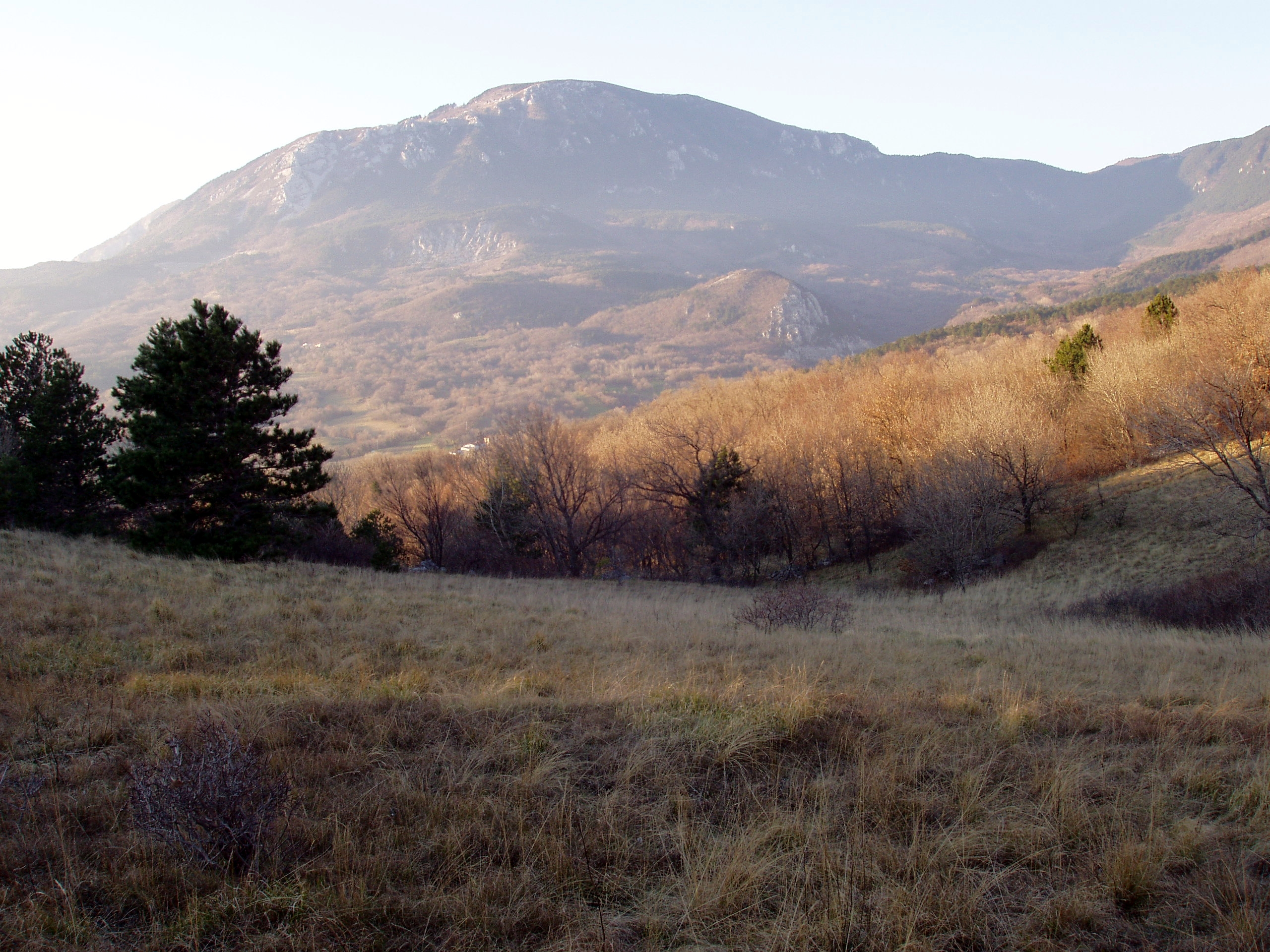
- View of Čaven from Škol Hill

Highest point
- Elevation: 1,242 m (4,075 ft)

Geography
- Location: Slovene Littoral, Slovenia
- Parent range: Trnovo Forest Plateau

Čaven is a ridge above the Vipava Valley in southwestern Slovenia. It constitutes the southern rim of the Trnovo Forest Plateau in the northern Dinaric Alps. Its highest peak is Big Modrasovec (Veliki Modrasovec) (1353 m a.s.l.), its slightly lower peak is Little Modrasovec (Mali Modrasovec) (1305 m a.s.l.), and the most scenic peak is Kucelj (1237 m a.s.l.). The peak Čaven in the west of the ridge has an altitude of 1185 m. Čaven may be ascended by trail from Predmeja, Stomaž, and Lokavec. From Čaven, one may view the Vipava Valley and the landscape to the Adriatic Sea. Two other nearby peaks are Sekulak (888 m a.s.l.) and Big Edge (Veliki Rob) (1237 m a.s.l.). Between Veliki Modrasovec and Mala Gora 1034 m a.s.l.), there is Anton Bavčer Lodge at Čaven. Čaven is built of upper Jurassic limestone. Next to the road on Selovec (1265 m a.s.l.), there is a prominent reef limestone site with fossils of coral colonies and hydrozoans. Čaven is the growing site of various brooms (Genista) and of the endemic herbaceous perennial Hladnikia pastinacifolia.
