= Spodnja Branica =

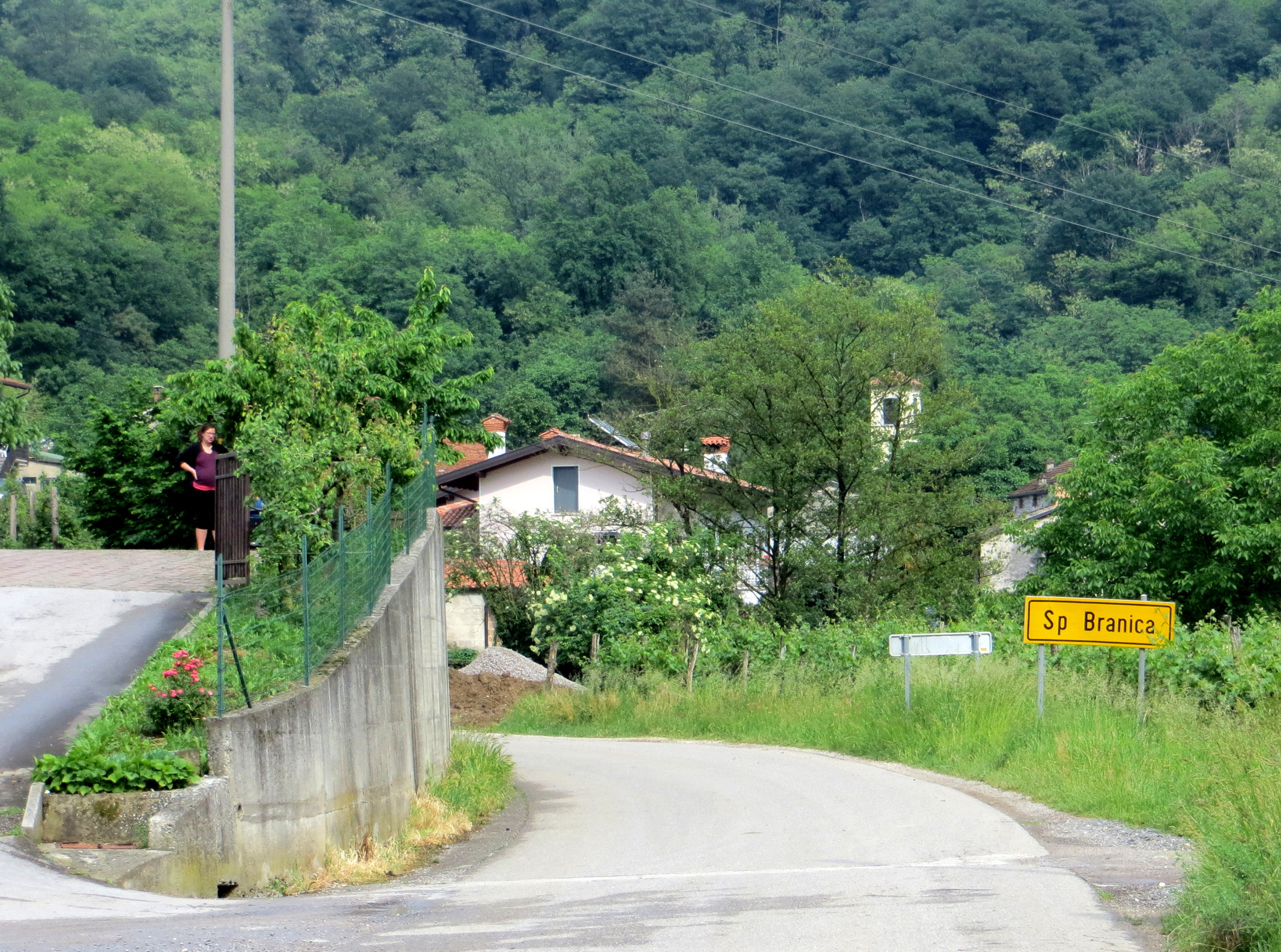

- Location in Slovenia
- Coordinates: 45°50′33.96″N 13°49′46.03″E
- Country: Slovenia
- Traditional region: Slovenian Littoral
- Statistical region: Gorizia
- Municipality: Nova Gorica

Area
  - Total: 1.08 km^{2} (0.42 sq mi)
- Elevation: 107.6 m (353 ft)

Population (2002)
  - Total: 115

Spodnja Branica (pronounced [ˈspoːdnja bɾaˈniːtsa]) is a village in western Slovenia in the Municipality of Nova Gorica. It is located southeast of Branik (formerly known as Rihemberk), just below the Karst Plateau.
