= Cesta, Ajdovščina =

Cesta
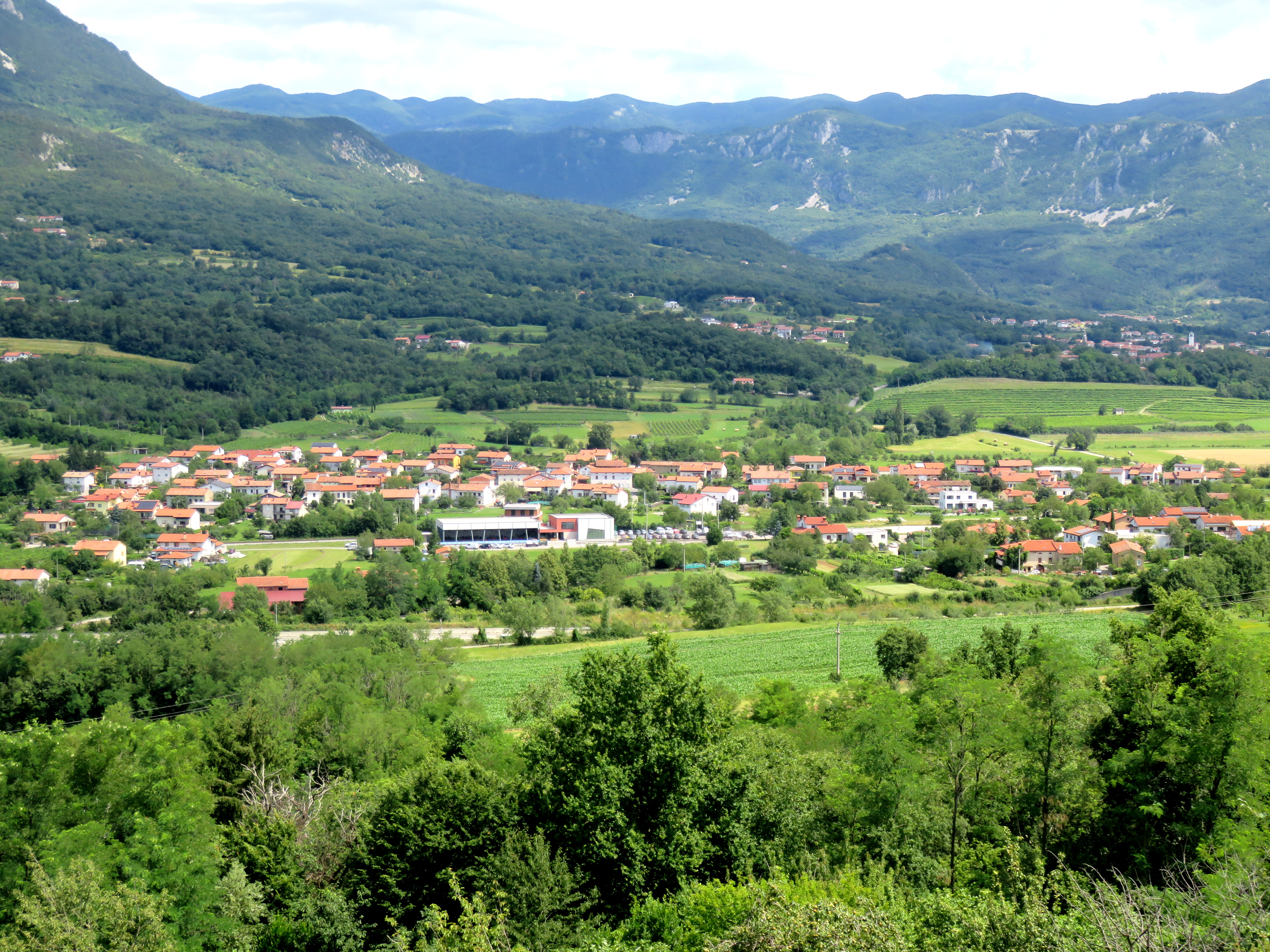

- Location in Slovenia
- Coordinates: 45°53′15.61″N 13°51′56.23″E
- Country: Slovenia
- Traditional region: Littoral
- Statistical region: Gorizia
- Municipality: Ajdovščina

Area
  - Total: 2.75 km^{2} (1.06 sq mi)
- Elevation: 120.4 m (395 ft)

Population (2020)
  - Total: 536

Cesta (pronounced [ˈtseːsta]; Italian: Strada) is a settlement in the Vipava Valley, 3 km west of Ajdovščina in the Littoral region of Slovenia.
