= Retail clerk =

Service role in retail business

A retail clerk, also known as a sales clerk, shop clerk, retail associate, or (in the United Kingdom and Ireland) shop assistant, sales assistant or customer service assistant, is a service role in a retail business.

A retail clerk obtains or receives merchandise, totals bills, accepts payment, takes orders, and makes change for customers in retail stores such as drugstores, candystores, or liquor stores (thus, the position may partially overlap with that of a cashier or teller). They clean shelves, counters, or tables; stock shelves or tables with merchandise; set up advertising displays or arrange merchandise on counters or tables to promote sales; stamp, mark, or tag prices on merchandise; and obtain merchandise requested by customers or receive merchandise selected by customers. They are expected to answer customers' questions concerning location, price, and use of merchandise; to total the price and tax on merchandise purchased by customers to determine a bill; and to accept payment, make change, and wrap or bag the merchandise for customers. They may remove and record the amount of cash in the register at the end of the shift. A retail clerk, particularly in a smaller store, may keep records of sales, prepare inventories of stock, or order merchandise.

A retail clerk is expected to be able to use basic math, read and write, as well as operate cash registers and apply discounts. They are also expected to stand on their feet for long periods of time.

== Wages ==
Retail clerks in the United States earned $14.03 per hour on average, or $29,180 per year in 2021. Parts salespeople earned on average $16.47 per hour. In the United Kingdom, they earn £10.42 per hour on average, or £21,673 per year as of August 2023.

== Automation ==
Many retail clerk positions have been replaced through automation. The number of Self Checkout Lanes (SCOs) in the U.S. increased 10% over the last five years. In grocery chains, they make up 38% of checkout lanes. Additionally, through a push for digital transformation, retail clerks are being replaced by mobile checkout and frictionless checkout options, such as in Amazon Go stores.

== See also ==
- Clerks, 1994 film by Kevin Smith
