= Stomaž, Ajdovščina =

Stomaž Štomaž (until 1987)
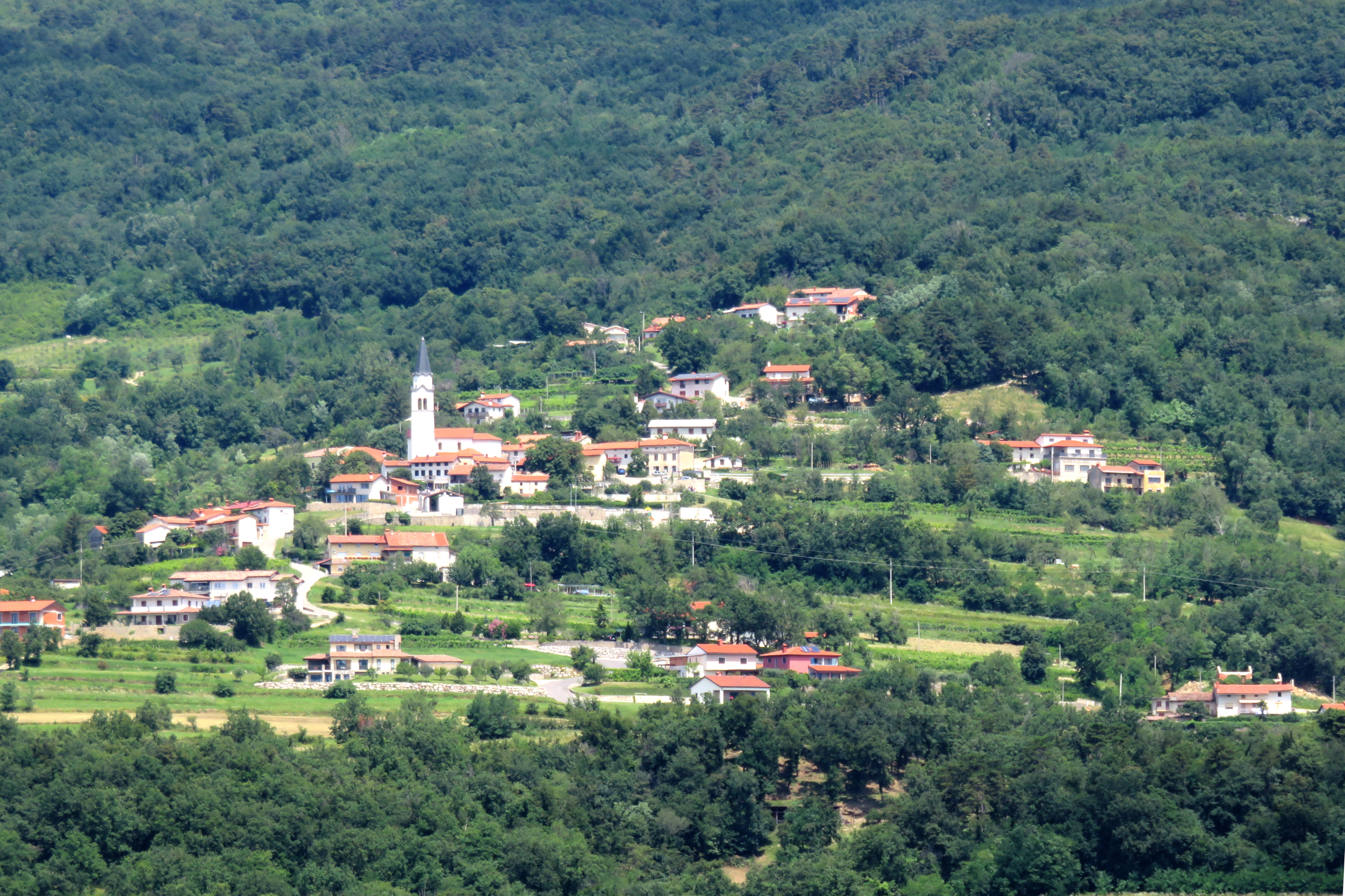

- Location in Slovenia
- Coordinates: 45°54′1.32″N 13°51′27″E
- Country: Slovenia
- Traditional region: Littoral
- Statistical region: Gorizia
- Municipality: Ajdovščina

Area
  - Total: 7.4 km^{2} (2.9 sq mi)
- Elevation: 289.8 m (951 ft)

Population (2020)
  - Total: 289
  - Density: 39/km^{2} (100/sq mi)

Stomaž (pronounced [ˈstoːmaʃ]) is a village in the hills north of the Vipava Valley in the Municipality of Ajdovščina in the Littoral region of Slovenia. It is made up of several smaller hamlets: Brith, Dolenja Vas (Slovene: Dolenja vas), Hrib, Ljubljanica, Griže, Črnigoji, Bratini, and Batagelji.

== Name ==
Stomaž was attested in written sources in 1523 as Sannd Thomas. The Slovene name Stomaž is derived from *šent Tomaž 'Saint Thomas', referring to the patron saint of the local church. This was contracted to Štomaž. The name of the settlement was changed from Štomaž to Stomaž in 1987.

== History ==
In the past, there were seven mills along Kranjšček Creek in the village; the last one stopped operating in 1944. During the Second World War, Partisan forces encamped at the Hribar Mill along Kranjšček Creek. They fled an Italian raid in February 1943. Until 1959, when a water main was installed from Pikovca Springs east of Stomaž, the village relied on rainwater for its water supply.

=== Mass graves ===
Stomaž is the site of four known mass graves from the Second World War. The Stomaž 1–4 mass graves (Slovene: Grobišče Stomaž 1–4) are all located east of the settlement. They are connected with the murder of 13 or 14 Slovene civilians in the fall of 1943. The first grave lies in the bushes in the ravine of Vrnivec Creek, about 90 m north of the house at Štomaž no. 8. No information is available except locals' reports that the creek once washed a human skull out of the grave. The second grave is located about 100 meters (330 ft) north of the house at Stomaž no. 8. It contained the remains of 11 victims; one is said to have been exhumed and reburied elsewhere. The third grave is located below a tree at the edge of the woods, about 90 meters (300 ft) north of the house at Stomaž no. 9. It contains the remains of a girl from Zalošče. The fourth grave is located below a path on the edge of the woods near the house at Stomaž no. 9 and is marked with a cross. It contains the remains of a schoolteacher from Ajdovščina or the vicinity and his wife.

== Church ==
The parish church, from which the settlement gets its name, is dedicated to Saint Thomas and belongs to the Koper Diocese.

== Recreation ==
Stomaž is a popular starting point for hikers heading to Mount Čaven (1,185 m). The village offers views of the Vipava Valley and Ajdovščina.
