= Planina, Ajdovščina =

Planina
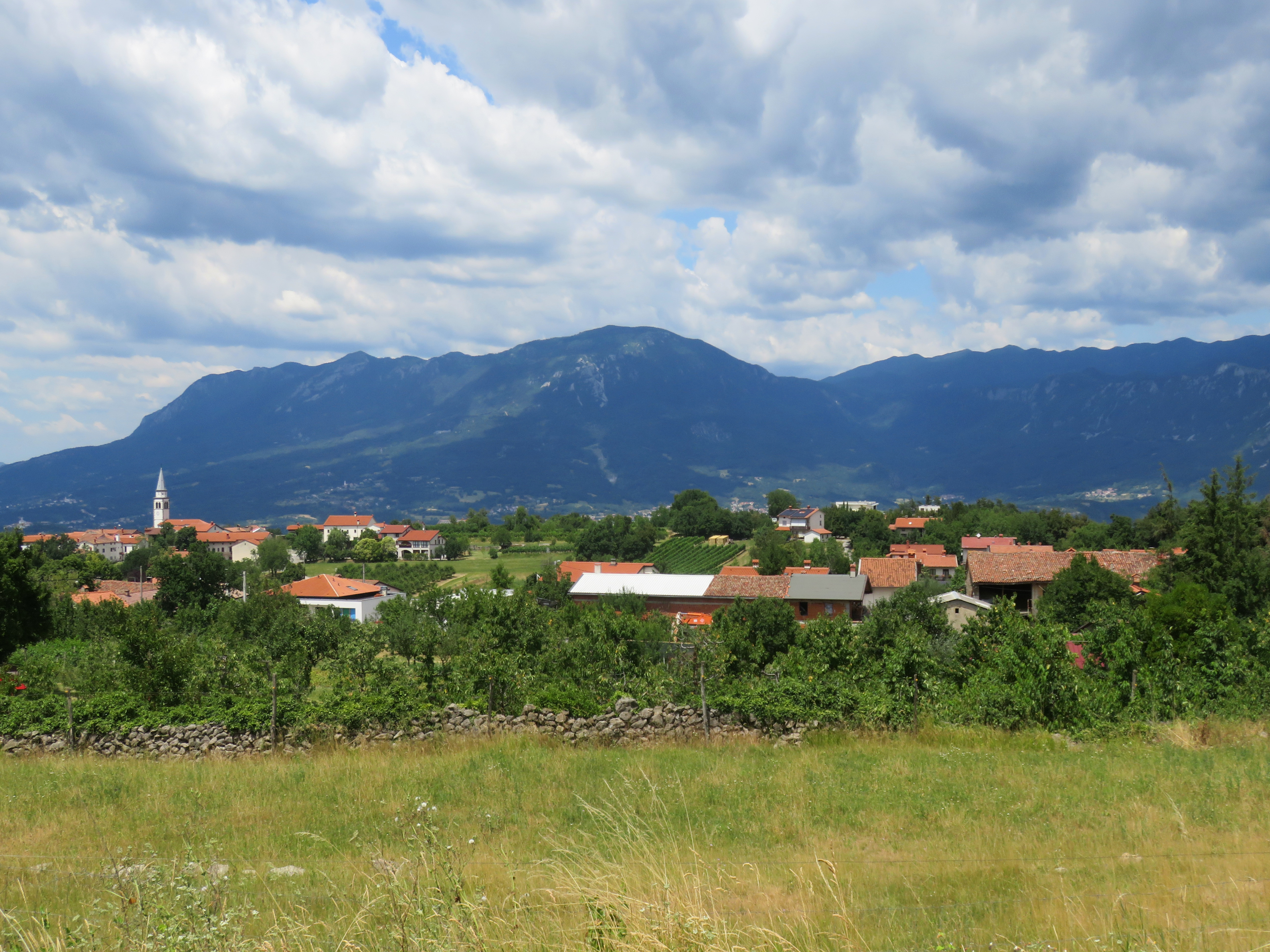

- Location in Slovenia
- Coordinates: 45°51′23.34″N 13°54′23.15″E
- Country: Slovenia
- Traditional region: Inner Carniola
- Statistical region: Gorizia
- Municipality: Ajdovščina

Area
  - Total: 6.49 km^{2} (2.51 sq mi)
- Elevation: 277 m (909 ft)

Population (2020)
  - Total: 490
  - Density: 76/km^{2} (200/sq mi)

Planina (pronounced [plaˈnìːna]) is a village in the hills south of the Vipava Valley on the border with the Karst Plateau in the Municipality of Ajdovščina in the traditional Inner Carniola region of Slovenia. It is now generally regarded as part of the Slovenian Littoral. It is made up of smaller clusters of the hamlets of Štrancarji, Marci, Dolenja Vas (Slovene: Dolenja vas), Brithi, Gorenja Vas (Gorenja vas), and Koboli.

== Churches ==
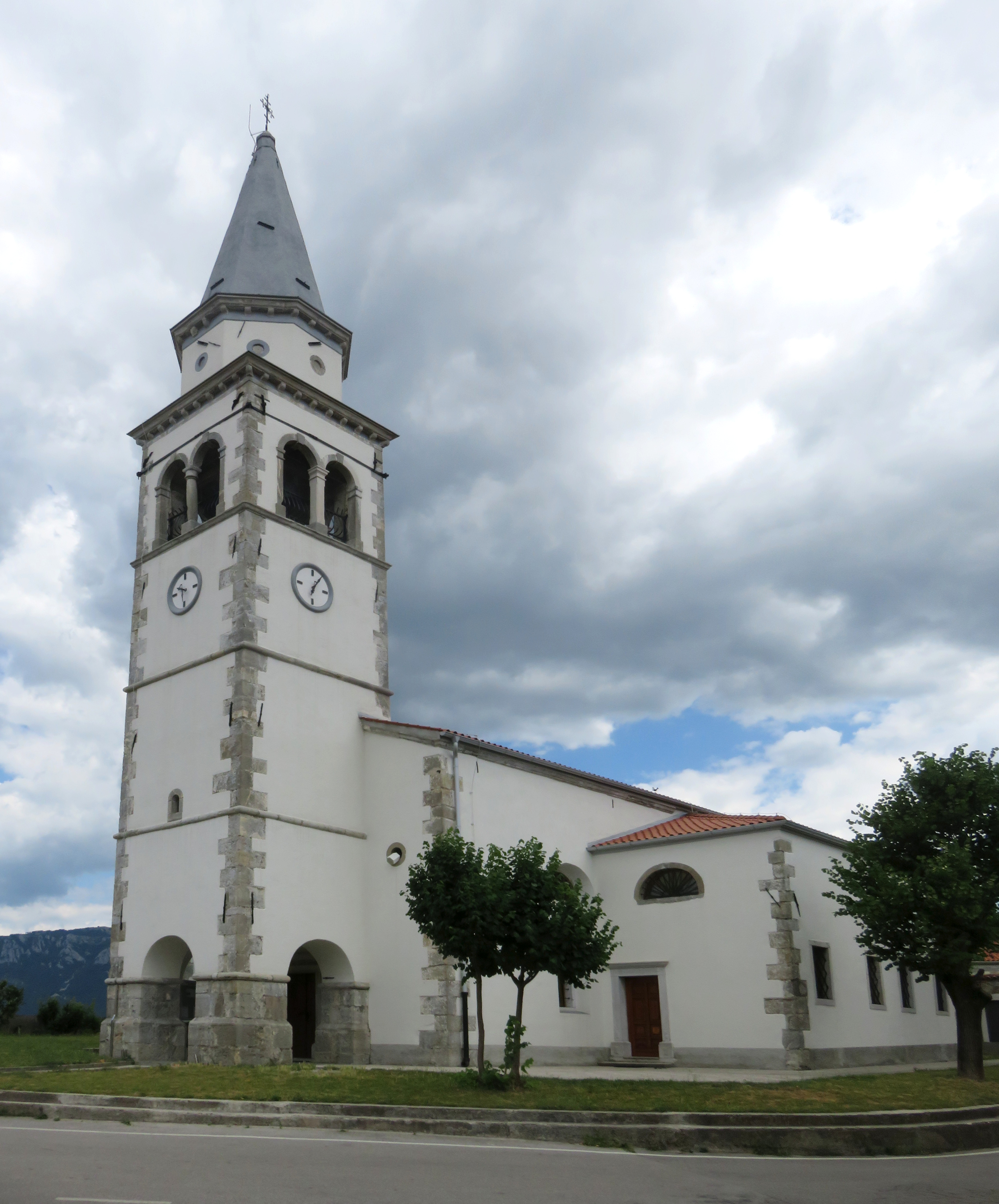
Saint Cantius's Church

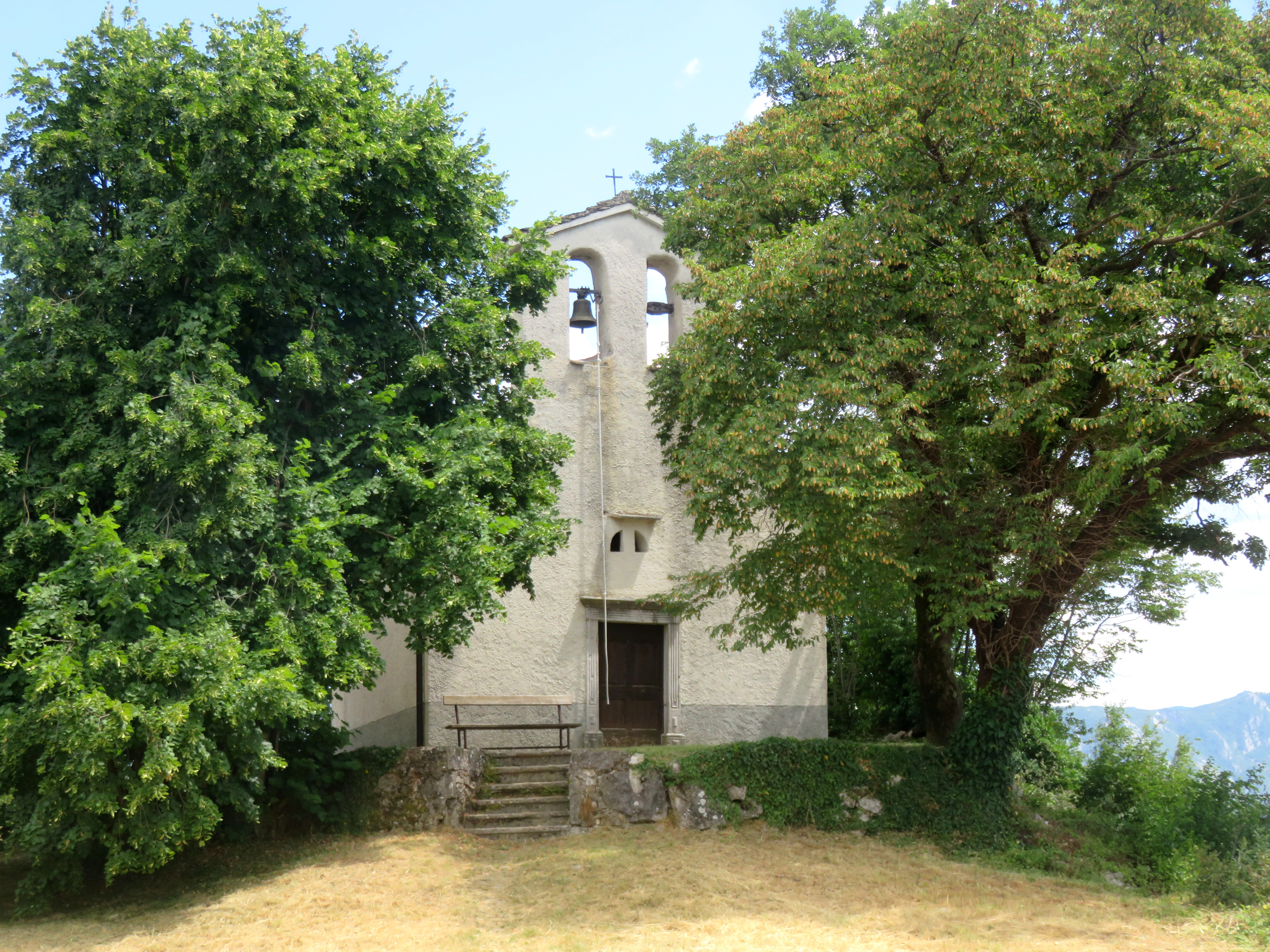
Saint Paul's Church

The parish church in the settlement is dedicated to Saint Cantius and belongs to the Koper Diocese. A second church belonging to the parish is built on a hill south of the main settlement and is dedicated to Saint Paul.
