= Lokavec, Ajdovščina =

Lokavec
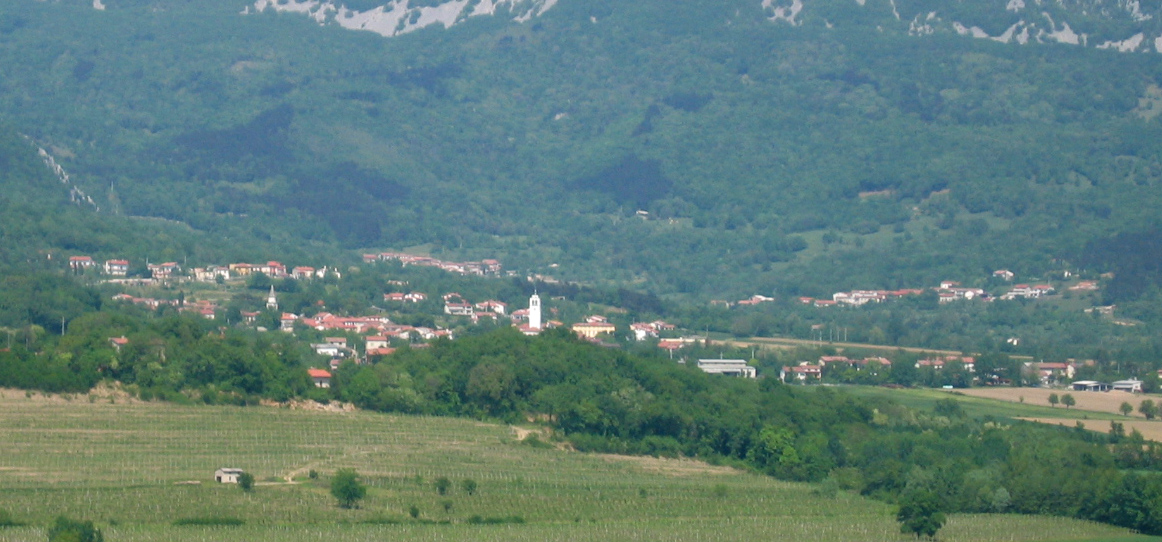

- Location in Slovenia
- Coordinates: 45°54′7.56″N 13°52′40.87″E
- Country: Slovenia
- Traditional region: Littoral
- Statistical region: Gorizia
- Municipality: Ajdovščina

Area
  - Total: 13.74 km^{2} (5.31 sq mi)
- Elevation: 173 m (568 ft)

Population (2020)
  - Total: 1,119
  - Density: 81.44/km^{2} (210.9/sq mi)

Lokavec (pronounced [lɔˈkaːʋəts]) is a settlement on the northern edge of the Vipava Valley northwest of Ajdovščina in the Littoral region of Slovenia. It lies below the slopes of Mount Čaven, below the Slano Blato Landslide. It includes the hamlets of Bitovi, Brith (or Britih), Čohi, Gorenje, Kuši, Lahovše, Loretovše, Mizinška Vas (Slovene: Mizinška vas), Paljki (or Palki), and Slokarji.

== Name ==
Lokavec was first attested in written sources in 1086 as Locunz and Locarizz. The name is derived from the adjective *lǫkavъ 'twisted, winding' or from the common noun *lǫkava 'curve, twist', perhaps originally a hydronym.

== History ==
The discovery of Celtic grave sites in Lovavec shows that it was already settled in prehistoric times. The Celtic settlement there had a defensive structure built on Gradišče Commons Hill (Slovene: Gradiška gmajna, elevation: 215 meters or 705 feet) in neighboring Ajdovščina.

During the Second World War, German forces arrested all of the men in the settlement capable of bearing arms and sent them to perform forced labor.

=== Mass grave ===
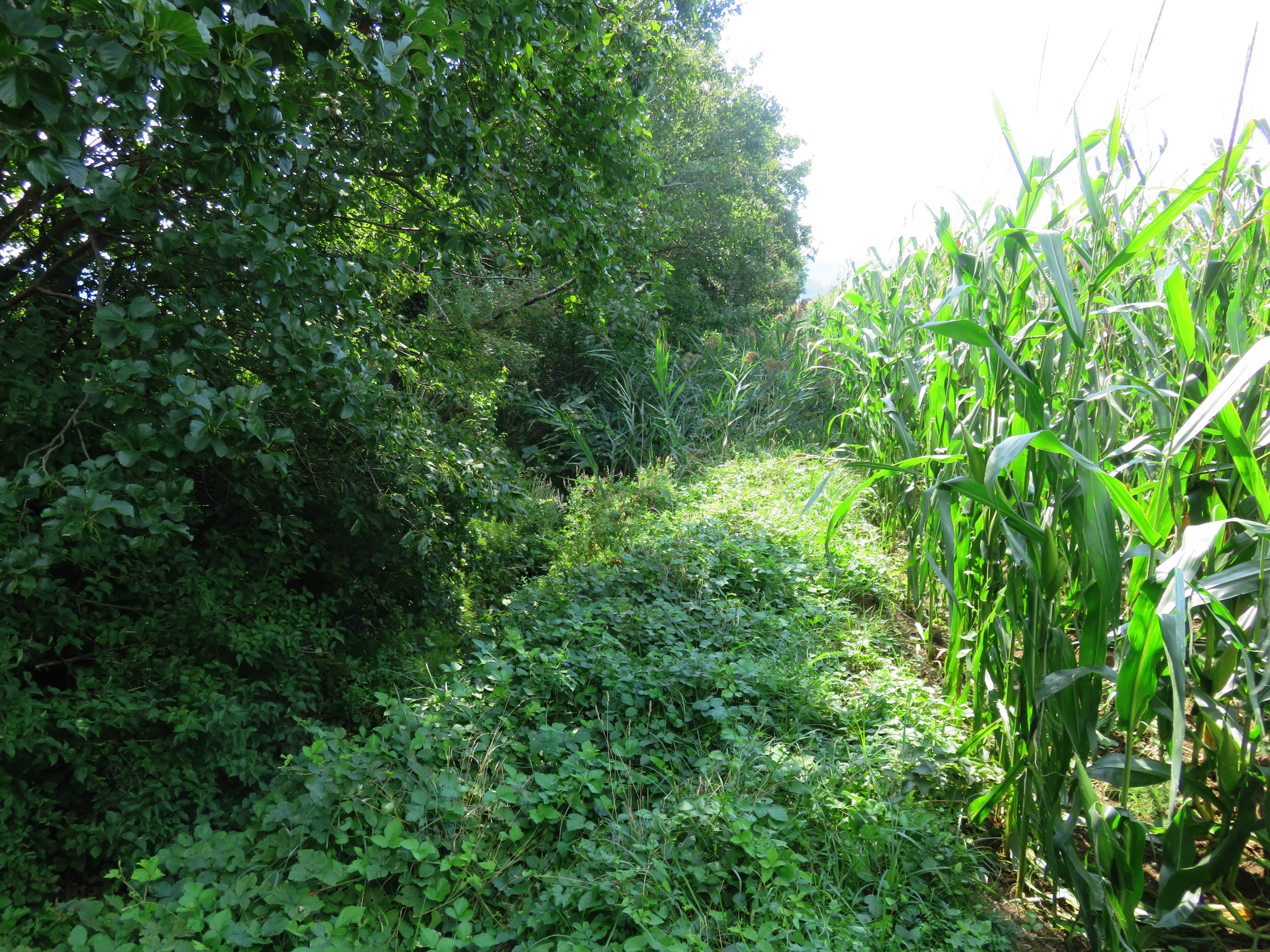
The Lokavec Mass Grave

Lokavec is the site of a mass grave from the period immediately after the Second World War. The Lokavec Mass Grave (Slovene: Grobišče Lokavec) is located in a field 600 meters (2,000 ft) west of the settlement. It contains the remains of five to seven Slovenian civilians murdered around 20 June 1945.

=== Postwar ===
Lokavec annexed the formerly independent settlements of Dolnji Lokavec and Slokarji in 1952.

== Churches ==
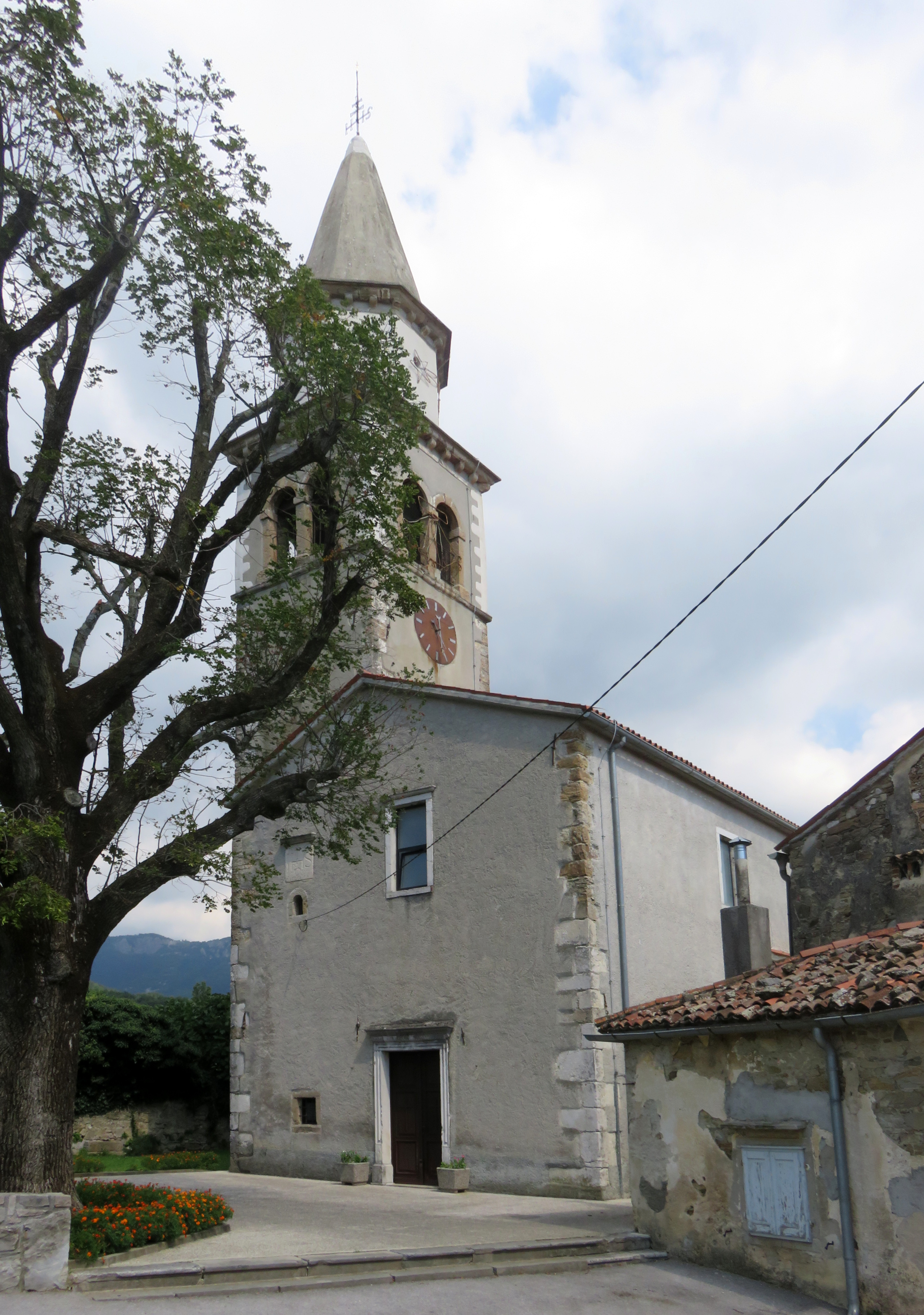
Assumption Church

There are three churches in the village: the parish church, belonging to the Koper Diocese and dedicated to Saint Lawrence, a second church dedicated to Saint Urban, and a church dedicated to St. Mary of the Assumption.

== Notable people ==
Notable people that were born or lived in Lokavec include:

- Miha Blažko (1810–1897), master mason
- Edmund Čibej (1861–1954), journalist and mineralogist
- Venceslav Čopič (1893–1980), education specialist
- Michael Cussa (ca. 1657–1699), sculptor
- Teodor Posteli (1909–1993), cardiologist
- Anton Slokar (1898–1982), politician
