= Šturje =

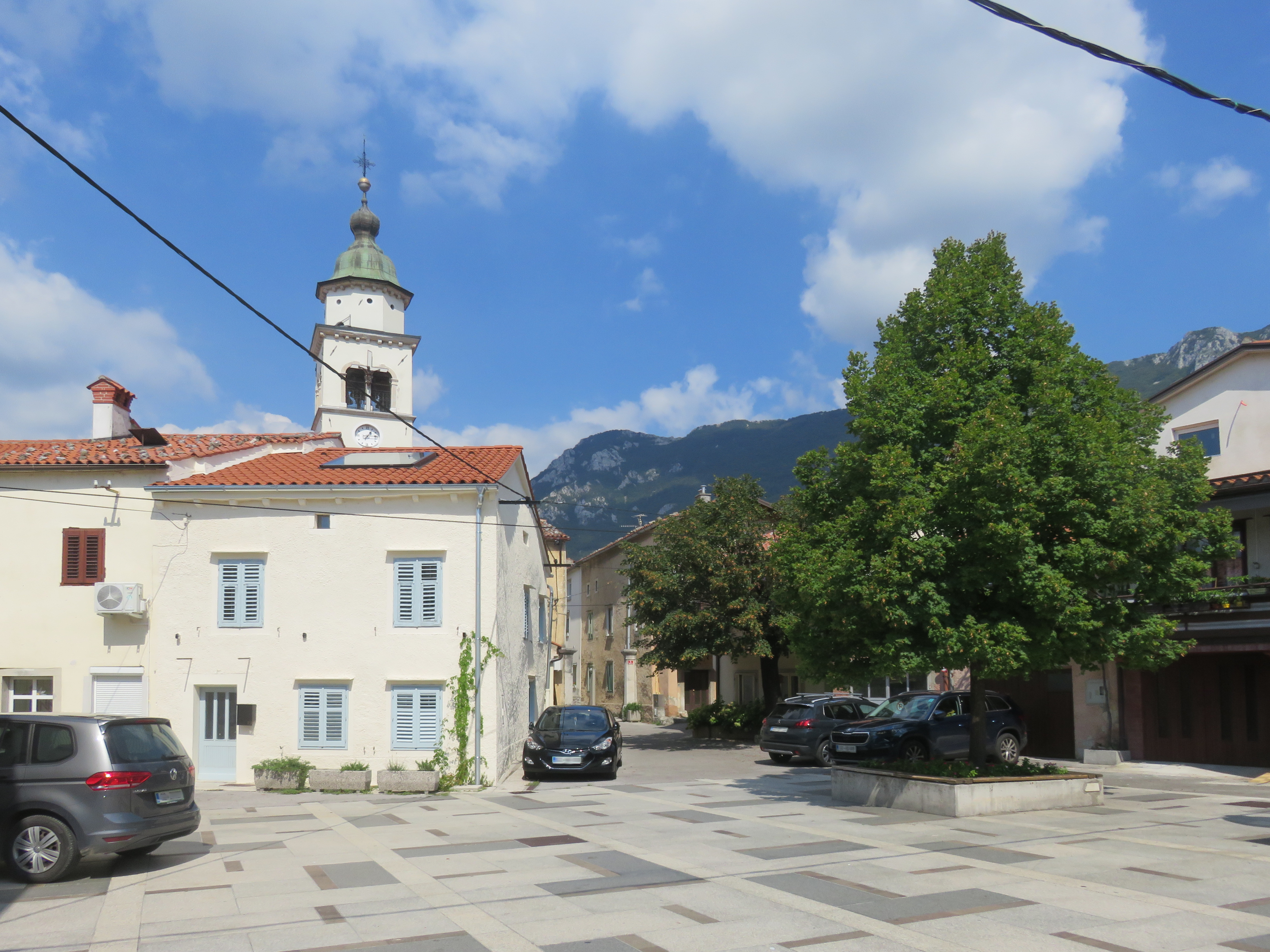

- Location in Slovenia
- Coordinates: 45°53′16″N 13°54′34″E
- Country: Slovenia
- Traditional region: Inner Carniola
- Statistical region: Gorizia
- Municipality: Ajdovščina
- Elevation: 105 m (344 ft)

Šturje (pronounced [ˈʃtuːɾjɛ]; in older sources also Sturja, German: Sturia, Italian: Sturie delle Fusine) is a formerly independent settlement in the Municipality of Ajdovščina in southwestern Slovenia. It is now part of the town of Ajdovščina. It is part of the traditional region of Inner Carniola and is now included with the rest of the municipality in the Gorizia Statistical Region.

== Geography ==
Šturje lies on the left bank of the Hubelj River, along the main road from Ajdovščina to Col. It included the hamlets of Grivče, Fužine, and Trnje to the north.

== Name ==
Šturje was attested in written sources as Sand Jörigen supp. in 1499. The name is derived from *Š(en)t-Júrij 'Saint George', but its derivation is unclear. Its plural form could indicate that is based on a former demonym, *Š(en)t-(j)urijane 'people living near Saint George's Church', but it is more likely based on the old masculine locative *š(en)t (J)úrije 'at Saint George's Church', which was then reinterpreted as a feminine plural.

== History ==
Together with its appertaining hamlets, Šturje had a population of 572 people living in 109 houses in 1870, 567 in 114 houses in 1880, 586 in 119 houses in 1890, and 556 in 120 houses in 1900. Šturje was annexed by Ajdovščina in 1953, ending its existence as an independent settlement.
