= Dörnberg (disambiguation) =

Dörnberg is a municipality in the district of Rhein-Lahn, Rhineland-Palatinate, Germany.

Dörnberg or Doernberg may also refer to:

== People ==
Dörnberg is a noble family in Germany.

- Alexander von Dörnberg (1901–1983), German jurist, diplomat and SS officer
- Baroness Wilhelmine of Dörnberg (1803–1835), German baroness
- Wilhelm von Dörnberg (1768–1850), German general
- Ferdy Doernberg (born 1967), English-German musician
- Stefan Doernberg (1924–2010), German writer and educator
- Vito of Dornberg (died 1591),

== Other ==
- Dornberg (Hessen), a municipality in Groß-Gerau, Germany
- TuS Dornberg, a German football club

== See also ==
- Dernberg
- Dörenberg
- Dornberger, a surname
- Dornberk
- Dornburg
