= List of cathedrals in Slovenia =

This is a list of cathedrals in Slovenia. All are Latin Catholic.

Cathedral	Present Archdiocese or Diocese	Location	Dedication	Status
Celje Cathedral; Stolnica sv. Daniela, Celje	Diocese of Celje	Celje	Saint Daniel	elevated on the creation of the diocese in 2006
Koper Cathedral; Stolnica Marijinega vnebovzetja, Koper	Diocese of Koper	Koper	Assumption of the Virgin Mary	also known as Capodistria; diocese re-created in 1977
Nova Gorica Cathedral; Stolna cerkev Kristus Odrešenik, Nova Gorica	Diocese of Koper	Nova Gorica	Christ the Redeemer	co-cathedral since 2003
Ljubljana Cathedral; Stolnica sv. Nikolaja, Ljubljana	Archdiocese of Ljubljana	Ljubljana	Saint Nicholas	re-elevated to an archdiocese in 1961
Maribor Cathedral; Stolnica sv. Janeza Krstnika, Maribor	Archdiocese of Maribor	Maribor	Saint John the Baptist	elevated on the creation of the diocese in 1962; archdiocese since 2006
Murska Sobota Cathedral; Stolnica sv. Nikolaja, Murska Sobota	Diocese of Murska Sobota	Murska Sobota	Saint Nicholas	elevated on the creation of diocese in 2006
Novo Mesto Cathedral; Stolnica sv. Nikolaja, Novo mesto, also Kapiteljska cerkev svetega Nikolaja	Diocese of Novo Mesto	Novo Mesto	Saint Nicholas	previously a collegiate or chapter church; elevated on the creation of the diocese in 2006

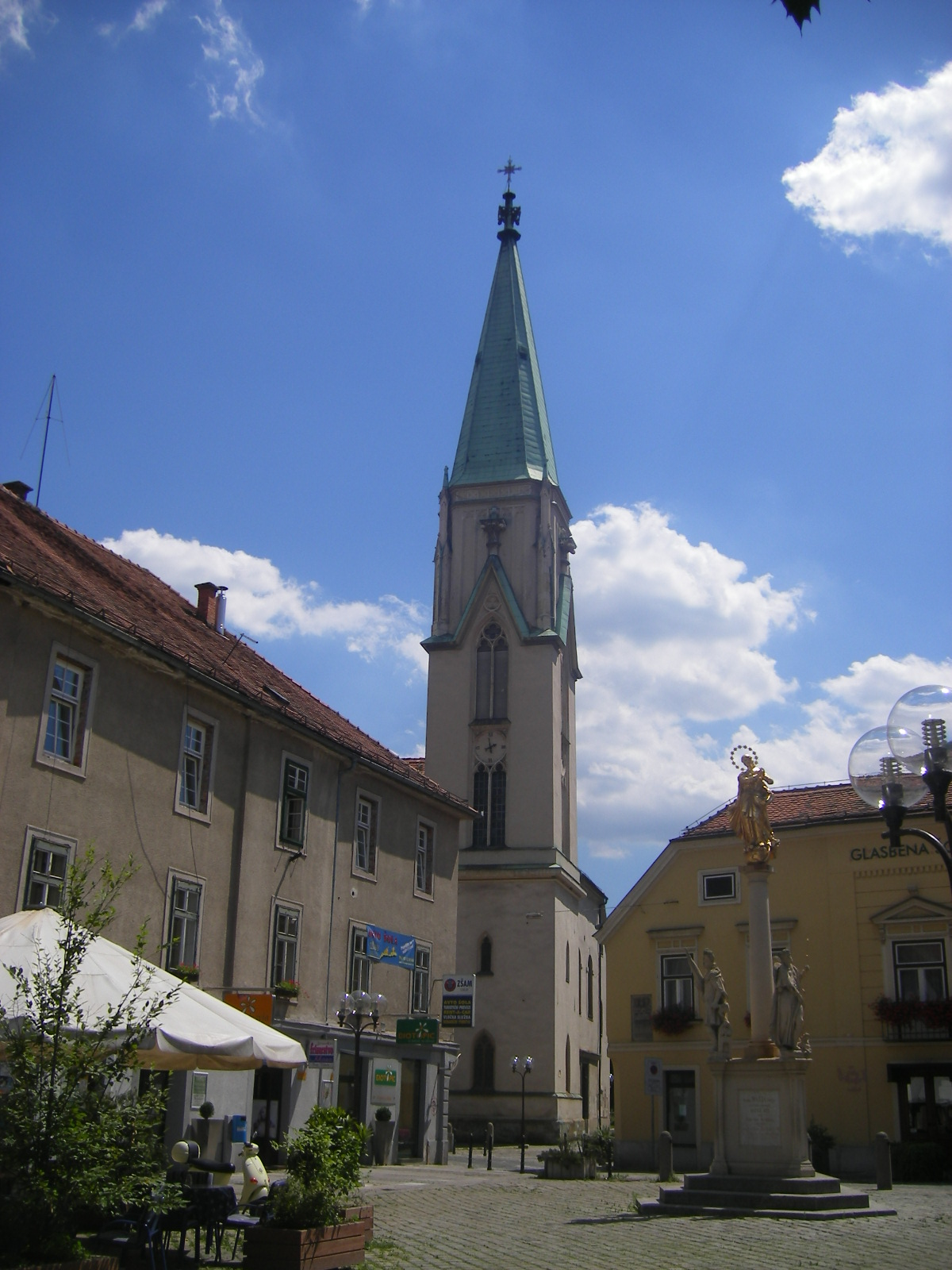
Celje Cathedral

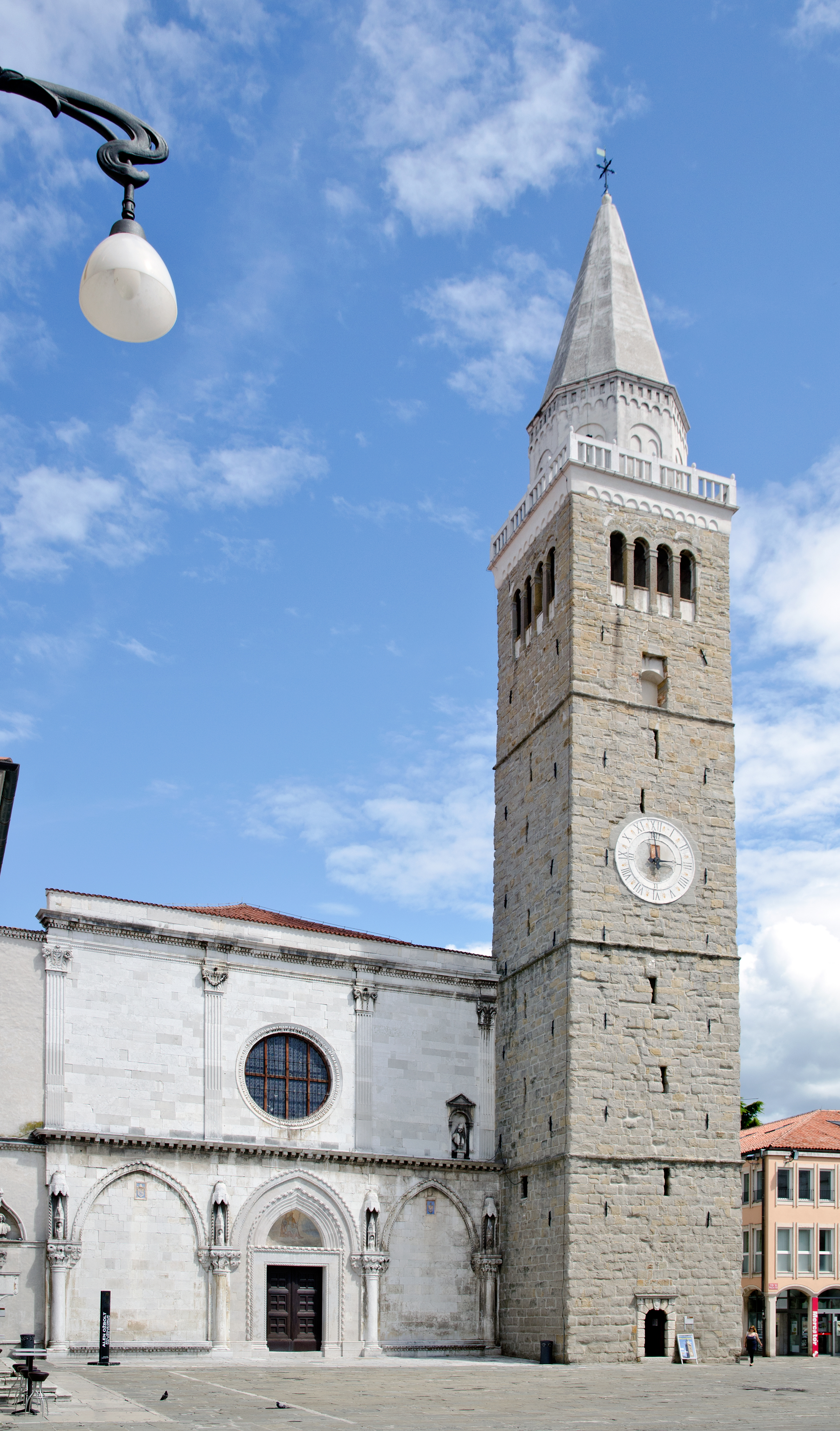
Koper Cathedral

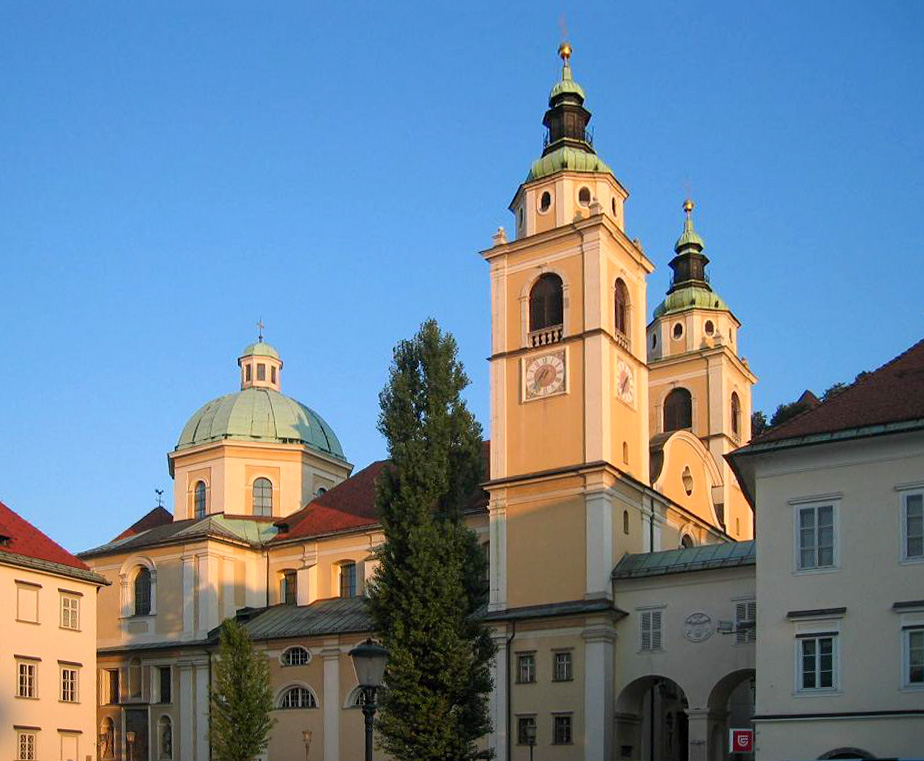
Ljubljana Cathedral

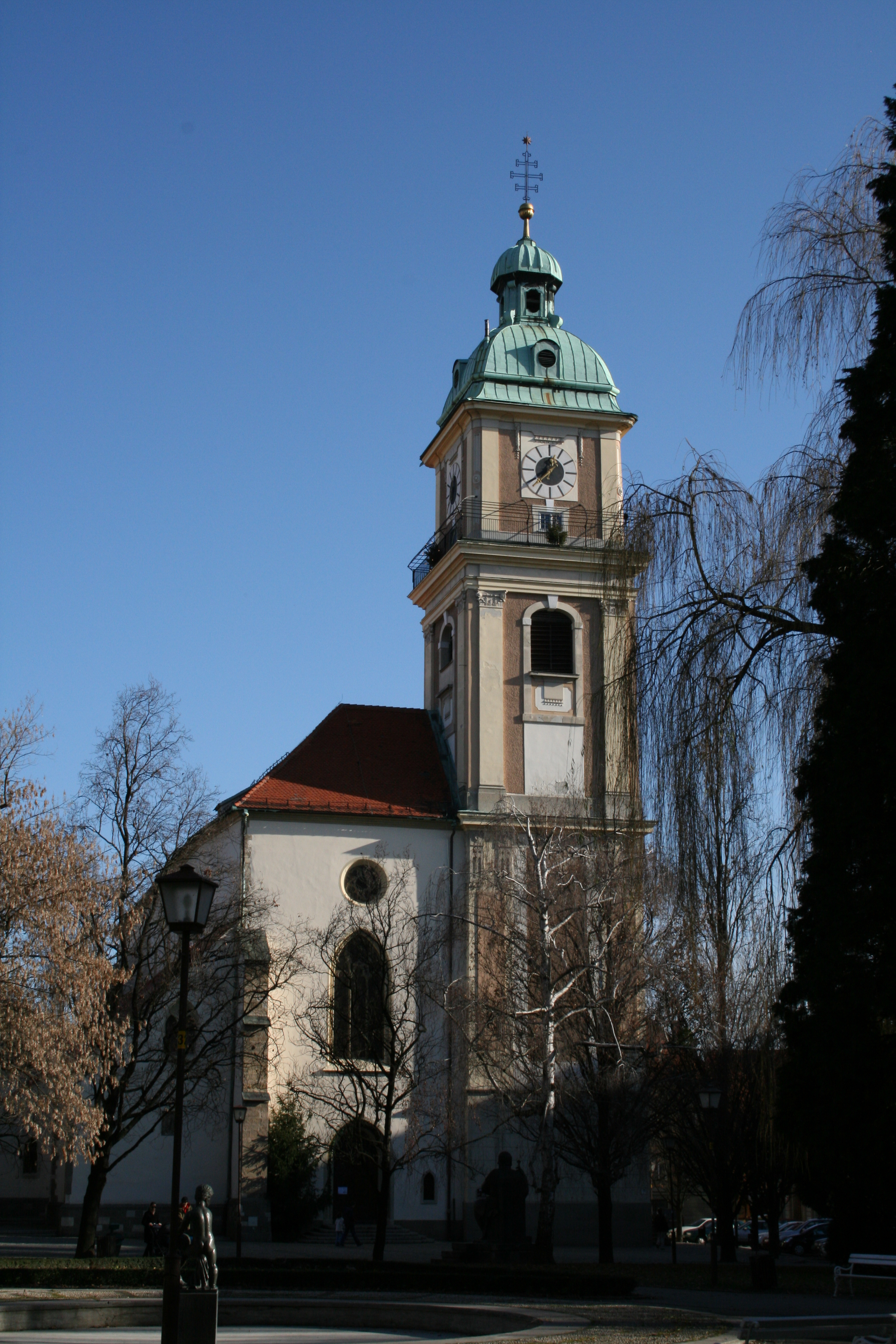
Maribor Cathedral

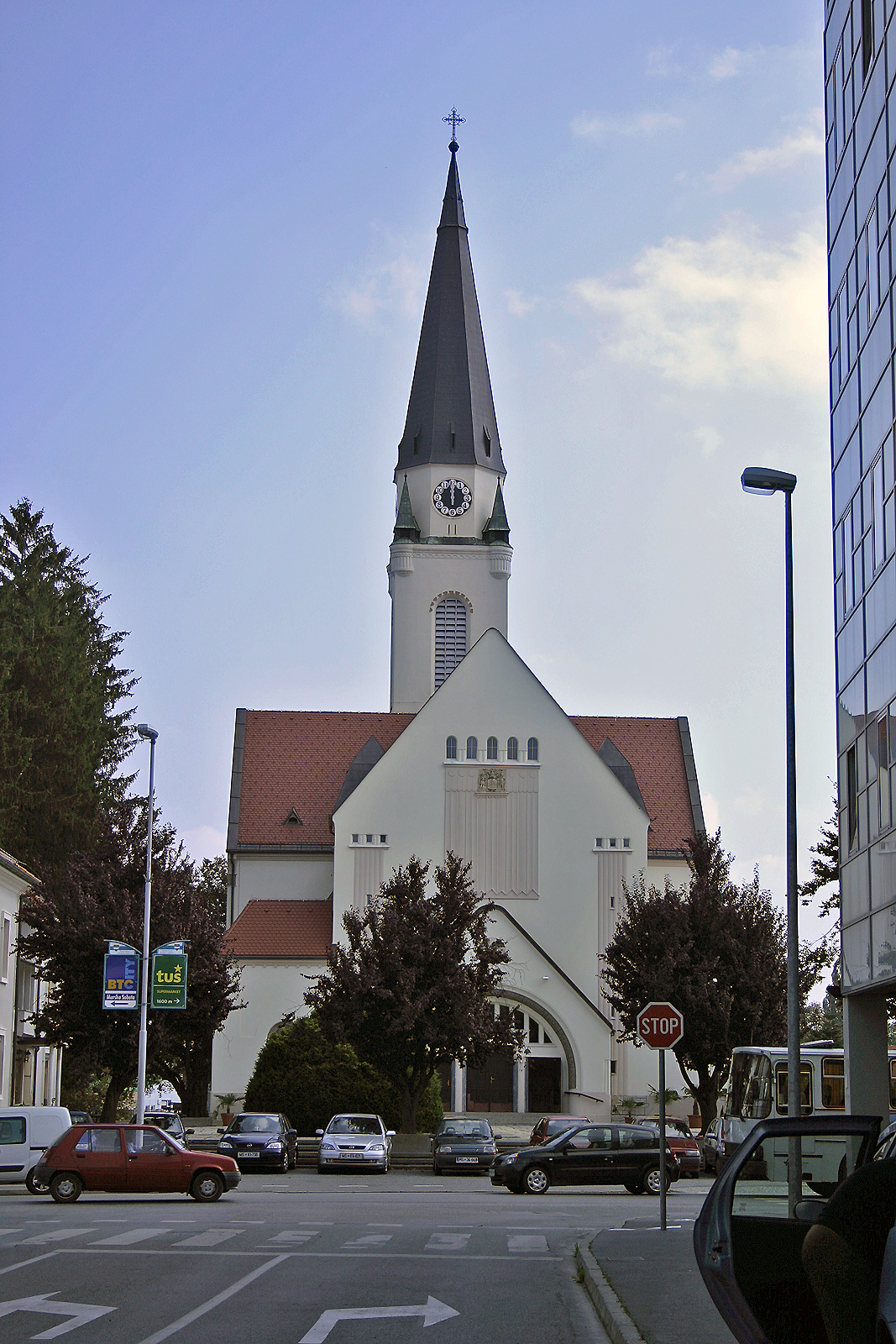
Murska Sobota Cathedral

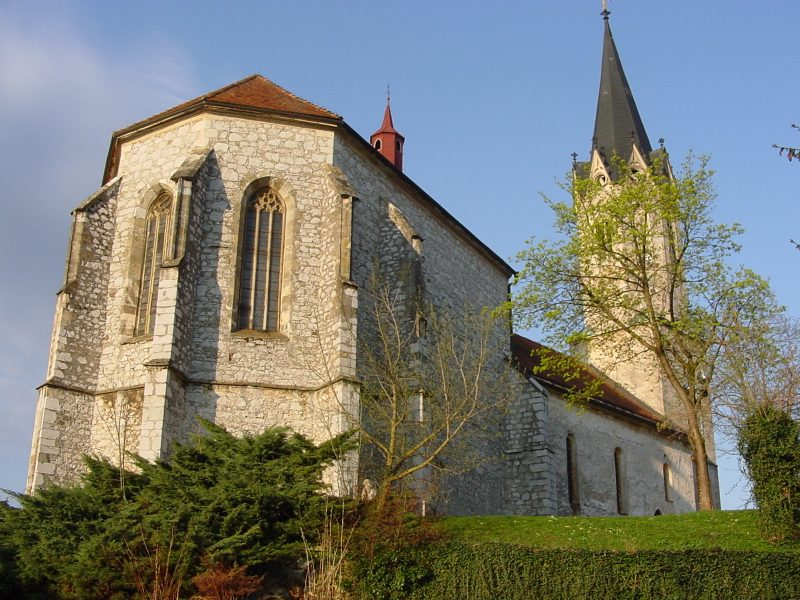
Novo Mesto Cathedral

== See also ==
- Catholic Church in Slovenia
- List of cathedrals
