= Mahniči =

- Village
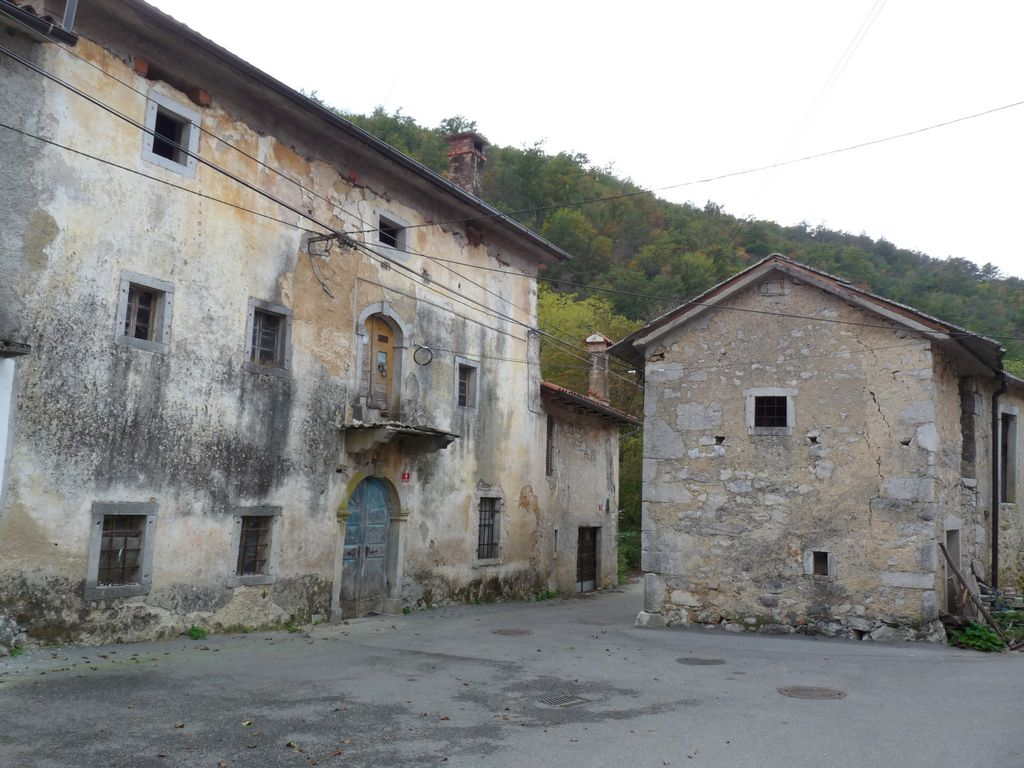

- Location in Slovenia
- Coordinates: 45°46′49.21″N 13°54′13.69″E
- Country: Slovenia
- Traditional region: Littoral
- Statistical region: Coastal–Karst
- Municipality: Sežana

Area
  - Total: 0.44 km^{2} (0.17 sq mi)
- Elevation: 242.6 m (796 ft)

Population (2002)
  - Total: 12

Mahniči (pronounced [ˈmaːxnitʃi]; Italian: Machinici) is a small settlement in the Municipality of Sežana in the Littoral region of Slovenia.

The local church is dedicated to Saint Anthony the Hermit and belongs to the Parish of Štjak.
