= Štorje =

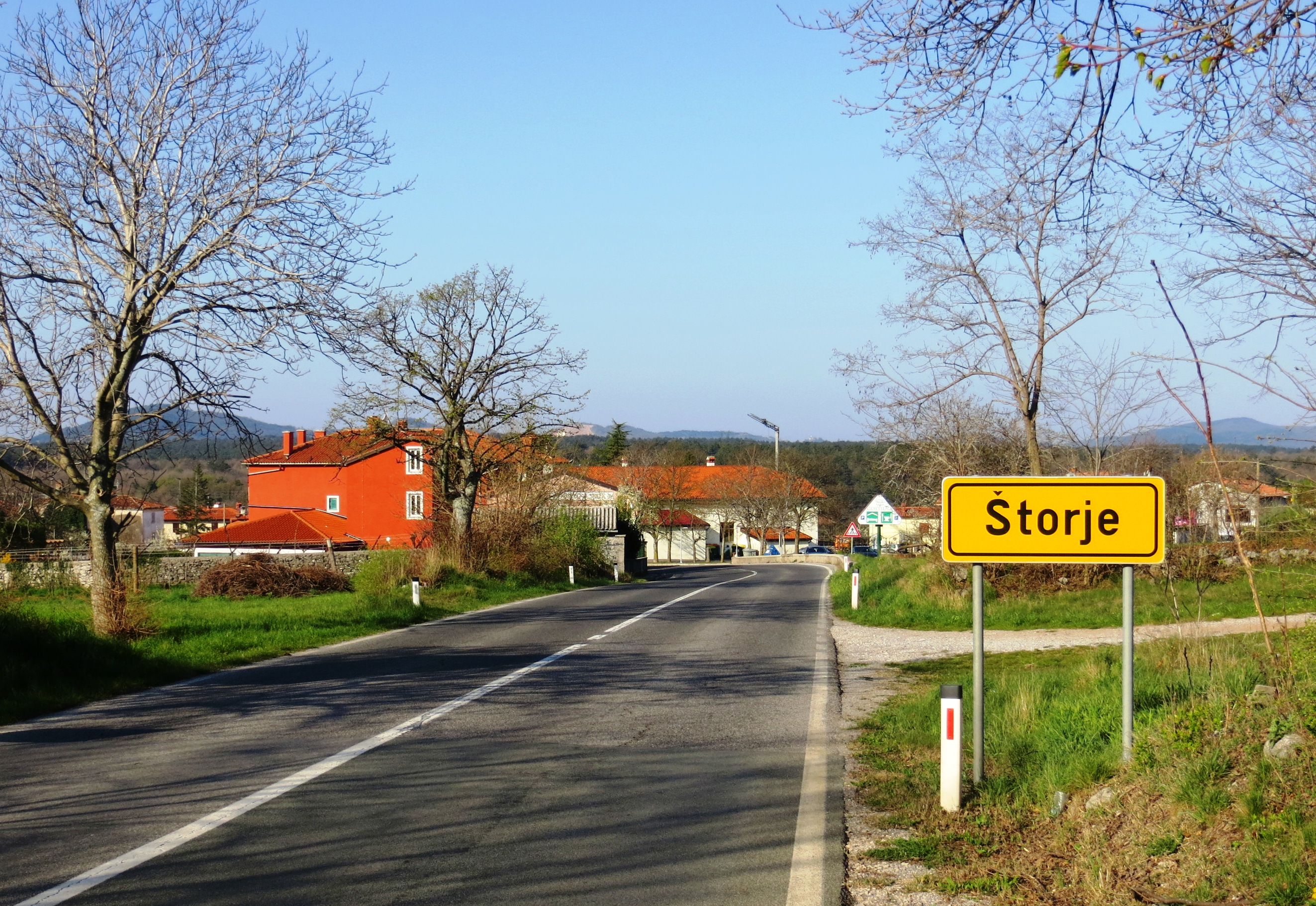

- Location in Slovenia
- Coordinates: 45°44′17.78″N 13°55′40.84″E
- Country: Slovenia
- Traditional region: Littoral
- Statistical region: Coastal–Karst
- Municipality: Sežana

Area
  - Total: 3.98 km^{2} (1.54 sq mi)
- Elevation: 347.9 m (1,141 ft)

Population (2002)
  - Total: 317

Štorje (pronounced [ˈʃtoːɾjɛ]; Italian: Storie) is a village in the Municipality of Sežana in the Littoral region of Slovenia.

== Church ==
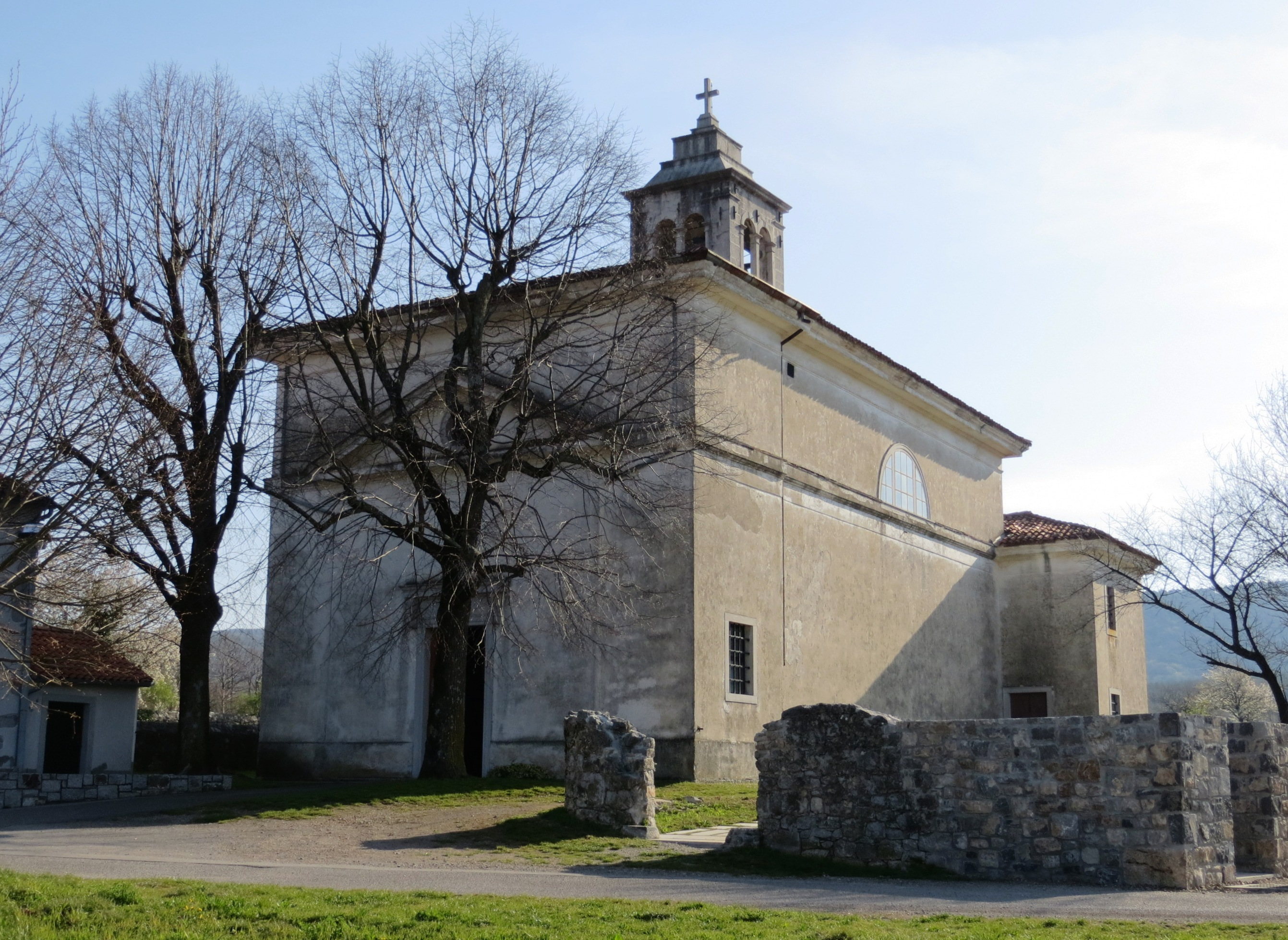
John the Baptist Church

The local church is dedicated to John the Baptist and belongs to the Parish of Povir.
