= Jurij Bizjak =

Slovene catholic bishop

Mons. Jurij Bizjak
- Bishop of the Diocese of Koper
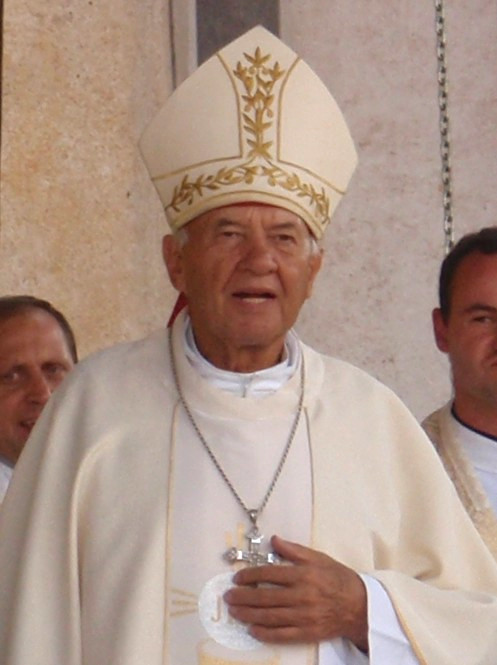
- Church: Roman Catholic Church
- Appointed: 26 May 2012
- Term ended: 29 November 2024
- Predecessor: Metod Pirih
- Successor: Peter Štumpf
- Other posts: Titular Bishop of Gergis and Auxiliary Bishop of Diocese of Koper (2000–2012)

Orders
- Ordination: 29 June 1971 (Priest)
- Consecration: 5 July 2000 (Bishop) by Metod Pirih

Personal details
- Born: Jurij Bizjak; 22 February 1947 (age 79) Col, FPR Yugoslavia (present day Slovenia)
- Education: University of Ljubljana, Pontifical Biblical Institute, Pontifical Urbaniana University

Bishop Jurij Bizjak (born 22 February 1947) is a Slovenian Roman Catholic prelate who served as a Bishop of the Diocese of Koper since 26 May 2012 until 29 November 2024. Previously he was a Titular Bishop of Gergis and Auxiliary Bishop of Diocese of Koper from 13 May 2000 until 26 May 2012.

== Education ==
Bishop Bizjak was born as the eldest son into a Roman Catholic family with four children in the present day Municipality of Ajdovščina in the Slovenian Littoral region.

After finishing primary school, which he attended in his native Col (1953–1958) and Ajdovščina (1958–1961), Jurij graduated a Minor Seminary in Vipava with the secondary education in 1965 and was admitted to the Major Theological Seminary in Ljubljana and in the same time joined the Theological Faculty at the University of Ljubljana, where he studied from 1965 until 1972 and was ordained as priest on June 29, 1971, while completing his philosophical and theological studies. In the meantime, during 1966–1967, he also served his compulsory military service in the Yugoslavian Army.

Coat of arms of Bishop Jurij Bizjak

== Pastoral and educational works ==
After his ordination Fr. Bizjak was engaged in the pastoral work and served as priest in Sežana, Ilirska Bistrica and Planina nad Ajdovščino from 1971 until 1976, when he continued his postgraduate studies at the Pontifical Biblical Institute in Rome, Italy with a bachelor's degree in biblical theology in 1979 and then – at the Pontifical Urbaniana University – a Doctor of Theology degree in 1983.

After completing his studies in Rome, he was appointed spiritual director at the Minor Seminary in Vipava and lecturer in biblical studies at the Theological Faculty of the University of Ljubljana. He was appointed an assistant professor at the Faculty of Theology in 1985, and an assistant professor in 1998. During 1990–1991 he studied in Jerusalem and after returning continued to work as professor, parish priest, and spiritual director at the Major Theological Seminary in Ljubljana.

== Prelate ==
On 13 May 2000, he was appointed by Pope John Paul II as the a Titular Bishop of Gergis and Auxiliary Bishop of the Diocese of Koper. On 5 July 2000, he was consecrated as bishop by Bishop of Koper Metod Pirih and other prelates of the Roman Catholic Church in the Cathedral of the Assumption of the Blessed Virgin Mary in Koper.

After retirement of his predecessor on 26 May 2012, he became the Diocesan Bishop of Koper and retired on 29 November 2024.

=== Marko Rupnik ===
On 22 December 2022, after revelations about alleged sexual abuse committed by Fr. Marko Rupnik, all of the bishops of Slovenia, including Bizjak, signed a letter condemning "all of Rupnik's acts of emotional, sexual, and spiritual violence and gross abuse of the sacrament of reconciliation" and stating "We support the superiors in their quest for truth and justice."

Rupnik petitioned to leave the Jesuit Order in January 2023. According to November 2023 statements by Fr. Johan Verschueren, SJ, in March 2023, Bizjak contacted the Jesuit Order on his own initiative to say that he would offer Rupnik incardination if Rupnik were allowed to leave the Jesuits. The Jesuits informed Bizjak "exhaustively" about the complaints made against Rupnik. Rupnik's petition to leave the Jesuit Order was denied, but he was expelled from the Jesuits for disobedience soon after in June 2023. According to Verschueren, "We asked [Bizjak] whether he would change his opinion after having received the information. He apparently did not.”

Rupnik was accepted into the diocese of Koper at the end of August 2023, a fact that was first reported and confirmed by the diocese in October 2023.

Catholic Church titles
Preceded by Patricio Infante Alfonso	Titular Bishop of Gergis; 2000–2012	Succeeded by Sérgio de Deus Borges
Preceded by Metod Pirih	Diocesan Bishop of Koper; 2012–2024	Succeeded by Peter Štumpf
