= Metod Pirih =

Slovenian Roman Catholic prelate (1936–2021)

Mons. Metod Pirih
- Bishop of Diocese of Koper
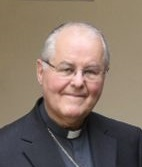
- Church: Roman Catholic Church
- Appointed: 16 April 1987
- Term ended: 26 May 2012
- Predecessor: Janez Jenko
- Successor: Jurij Bizjak
- Other post: Coadjutor Bishop of Diocese of Koper (1985–1987)

Orders
- Ordination: 26 June 1963 (Priest)
- Consecration: 27 May 1985 (Bishop) by Janez Jenko

Personal details
- Born: Metod Pirih; 9 May 1936 Locavizza, Kingdom of Italy (present day Lokovec, Slovenia)
- Died: 23 March 2021 (aged 84) Vipava, Slovenia
- Education: University of Ljubljana, Teresianum

Bishop Metod Pirih (9 May 1936 – 23 March 2021) was a Slovenian Roman Catholic prelate who served as the second Bishop of the Diocese of Koper from 16 April 1987 until his retirement on 26 May 2012. Before he was a Coadjutor Bishop of the same Diocese since 25 March 1985 until 16 April 1987.

== Education ==
Bishop Pirih was born into a Roman Catholic family of Mirko and Štefanija (née Šuligoj) in the present day City Municipality of Nova Gorica, that in this time was governed by Italians and was baptized at the local church on the day of his birth.

After finishing primary school, which he attended in his native Lokovec in 1948 and graduation from a classical gymnasium in Pazin, Croatia in 1956, he was admitted to the Major Theological Seminary in Ljubljana and in the same time joined the Theological Faculty at the University of Ljubljana, where he studied from 1956 until 1963 and was ordained as priest on June 26, 1963 in Ljubljana for the Diocese of Trieste–Koper (for its Slovenian part), after he completed his philosophical and theological studies. In the meantime, he also served his compulsory military service in the Yugoslavian Army.

== Pastoral and educational work ==
After his ordination Fr. Pirih served a short time as a parish priest in Solkan (1963–1964) and after that became a personal assistant to Bishop Janez Jenko from 1964 until 1974, when he continued his postgraduate studies at the Pontifical Theological Faculty Teresianum in Rome, Italy with a master's degree in the camp of a spiritual theology in 1976.

After returning to his homeland, he became a spiritual director at the Major Theological Seminary in Ljubljana (1976–1984), and in 1977 he again became Bishop Jenko's personal assistant. As an educator of future priests, he remained in Ljubljana until 1984, when Bishop Jenko appointed him a Vicar General of the Diocese of Koper. Between 1984 and 1986, he was the head of the Pastoral Service in Koper and the parish administrator of the parish in Podgorje. In the meantime, he also was a lecturer at the University of Ljubljana unit of the Faculty of Theology.

== Prelate ==
On March 25, 1985, he was appointed by Pope John Paul II as the Coadjutor Bishop of the Roman Catholic Diocese of Koper. On May 27, 1985, he was consecrated as bishop by the Diocesan Bishop Janez Jenko and other prelates of the Roman Catholic Church in the Cathedral of the Assumption of the Blessed Virgin Mary in Koper. Two years later, on April 16, 1987 he succeeded his predecessor.

Bishop Pirih retired on May 26, 2012 after reaching the age limit of 75 years old.

Catholic Church titles
Preceded by none	Coadjutor Bishop of Koper; 1985–1987	Succeeded by none
Preceded by Janez Jenko	Diocesan Bishop of Koper; 1987–2012	Succeeded by Jurij Bizjak
