= Dornberk =

Dornberk Zali Hrib (1952–1955)
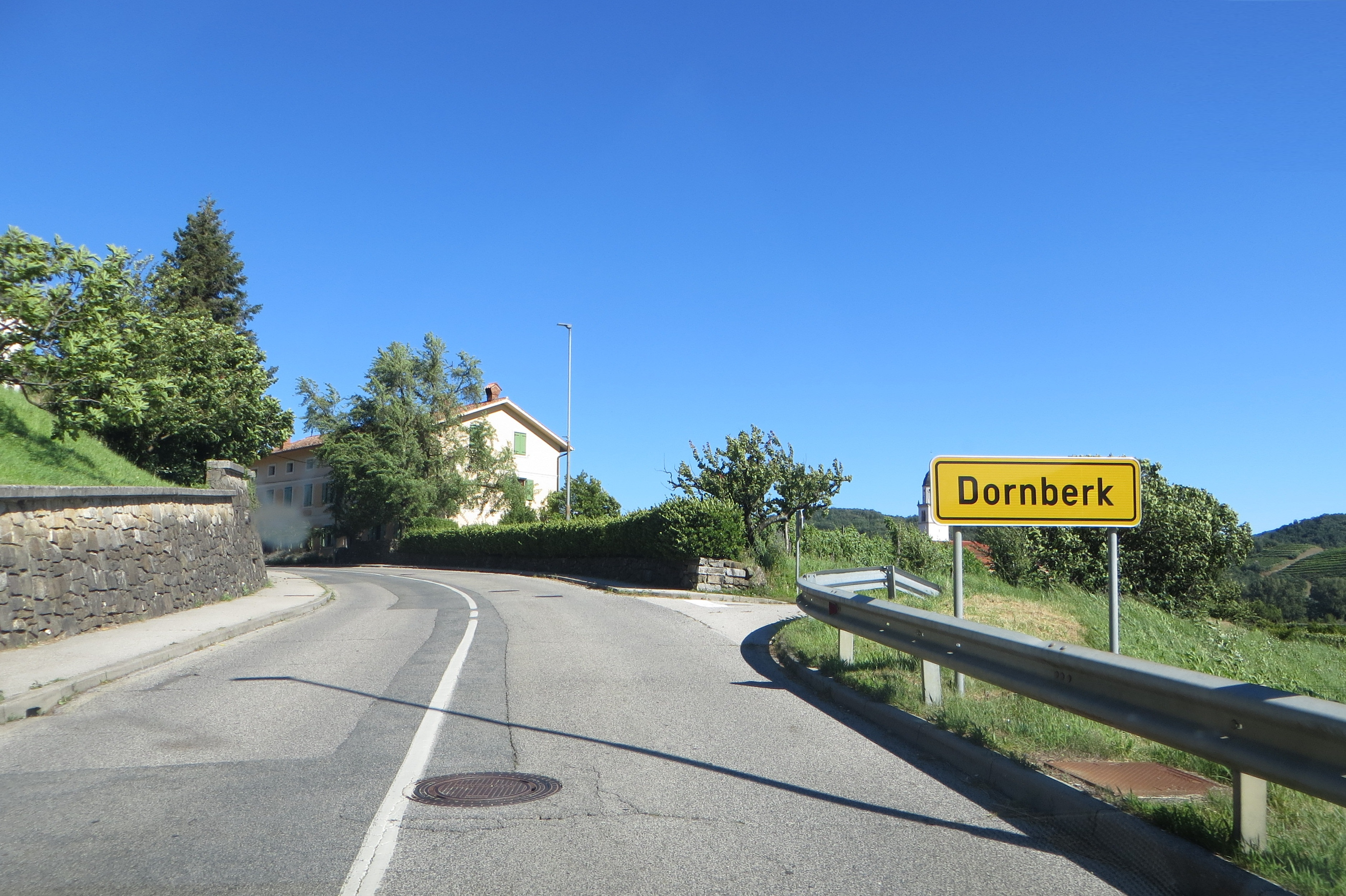

- Location in Slovenia
- Coordinates: 45°53′21.08″N 13°44′9″E
- Country: Slovenia
- Traditional region: Slovenian Littoral
- Statistical region: Gorizia
- Municipality: Nova Gorica

Area
  - Total: 1.08 km^{2} (0.42 sq mi)
- Elevation: 60.7 m (199 ft)

Population (2002)
  - Total: 795

Dornberk (pronounced [ˈdoːɾnbɛɾk]; Italian: Montespino) is a village in western Slovenia in the Municipality of Nova Gorica. It is located in the Vipava Valley within the Goriška region of the Slovenian Littoral. Dornberk is the centre of a local community that includes the satellite settlements of Potok pri Dornberku, Saksid, Brdo, Tabor, Draga, Zalošče, and Budihni. The entire local community has a population of around 1,800.

== Name ==
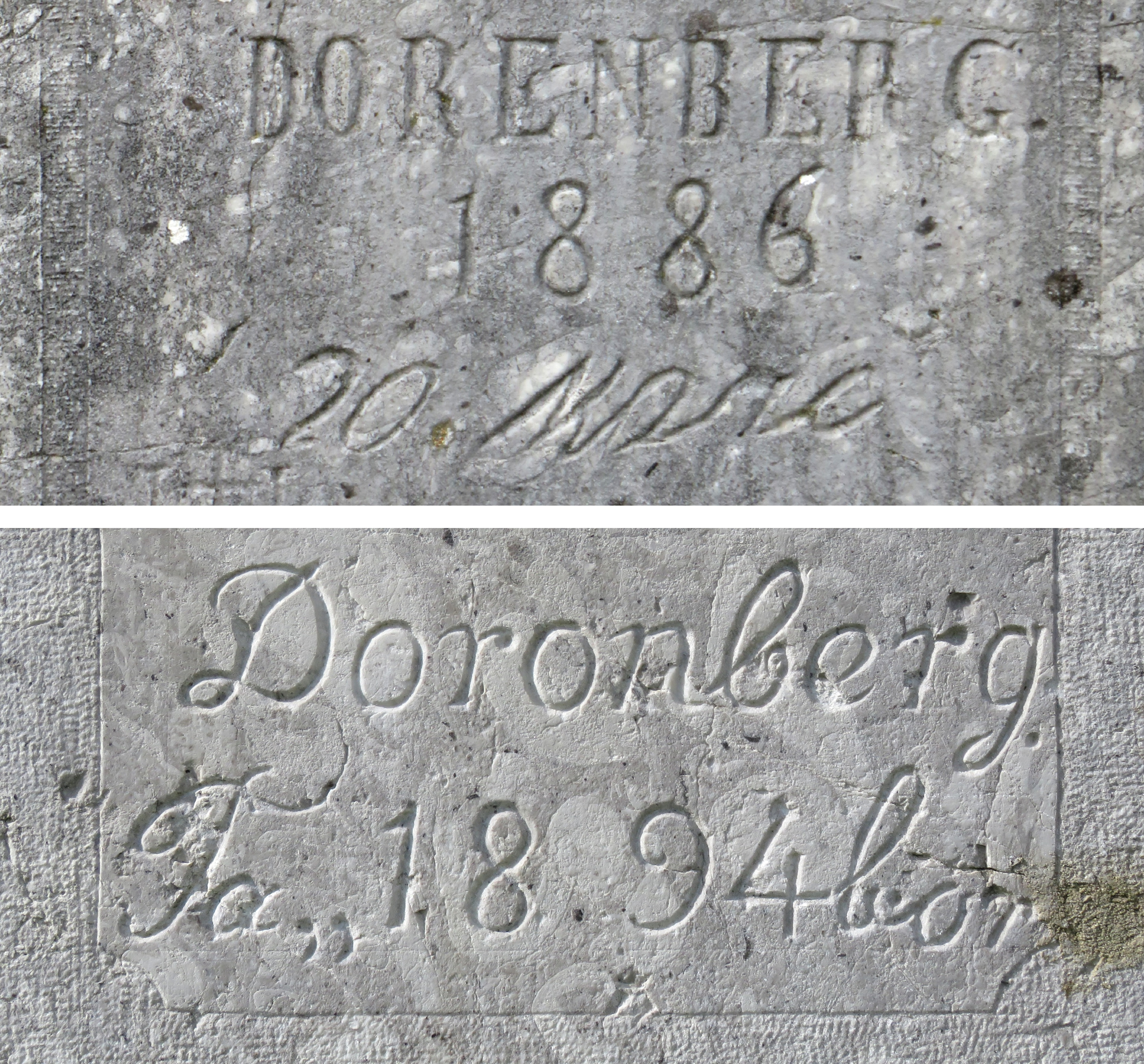
Dornberk in old inscriptions: Dorenberg (top, 1886) and Doronberg (bottom, 1894)

The Slovene name of the village comes from German Dornberg, meaning 'thorn hill'. This was also the official name until the end of World War I, when the village came under Italian administration. At first, the Italians used a historical version of the traditional name of the village, Dorimbergo, but during the Fascist period the name was changed to Montespino, which is a literal Italian translation of the German name. After World War II, the village briefly reacquired its old name, but in 1952 the name was changed again because of its German sound, and the name Zali Hrib (literally, 'bad hill') was invented. The locals rejected the new designation and demanded the old name back. The name of the settlement was changed to Dornberg in 1955, and later the final -g was replaced with a -k. Nevertheless, the locals still refer to it as Dornberg rather than Dornberk. This phonetic difference is not perceived in the nominative case in standard Slovene, in which the final voiced velar stop /g/ is pronounced as voiceless /k/. However, in the local Karst dialect spoken in the lower Vipava Valley, /g/ has developed into the voiced glottal fricative /ɦ/, and often a voiceless glottal fricative at the end of words.

== Economy ==
The Dornberk area is known for the production of wine and fruits, especially peaches, apricots, and pears.

== Church ==
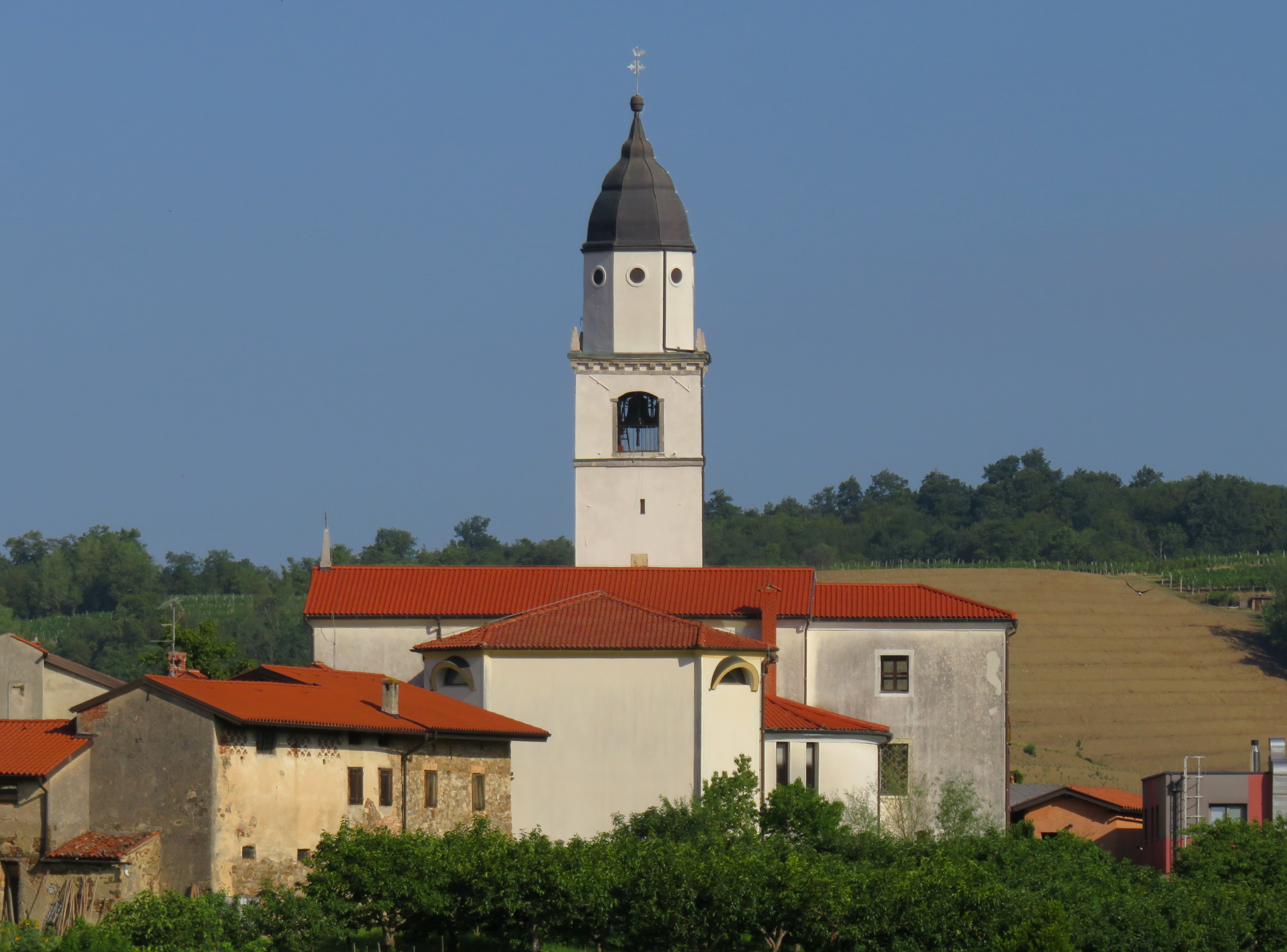
Prophet Daniel Church

The parish church in the settlement is dedicated to the Prophet Daniel and belongs to the Diocese of Koper.

== See also ==
- Gorizia and Gradisca
- Austrian Littoral
- Julian March
- Vito of Dornberg
- Wines of Slovenia
