= Saksid =

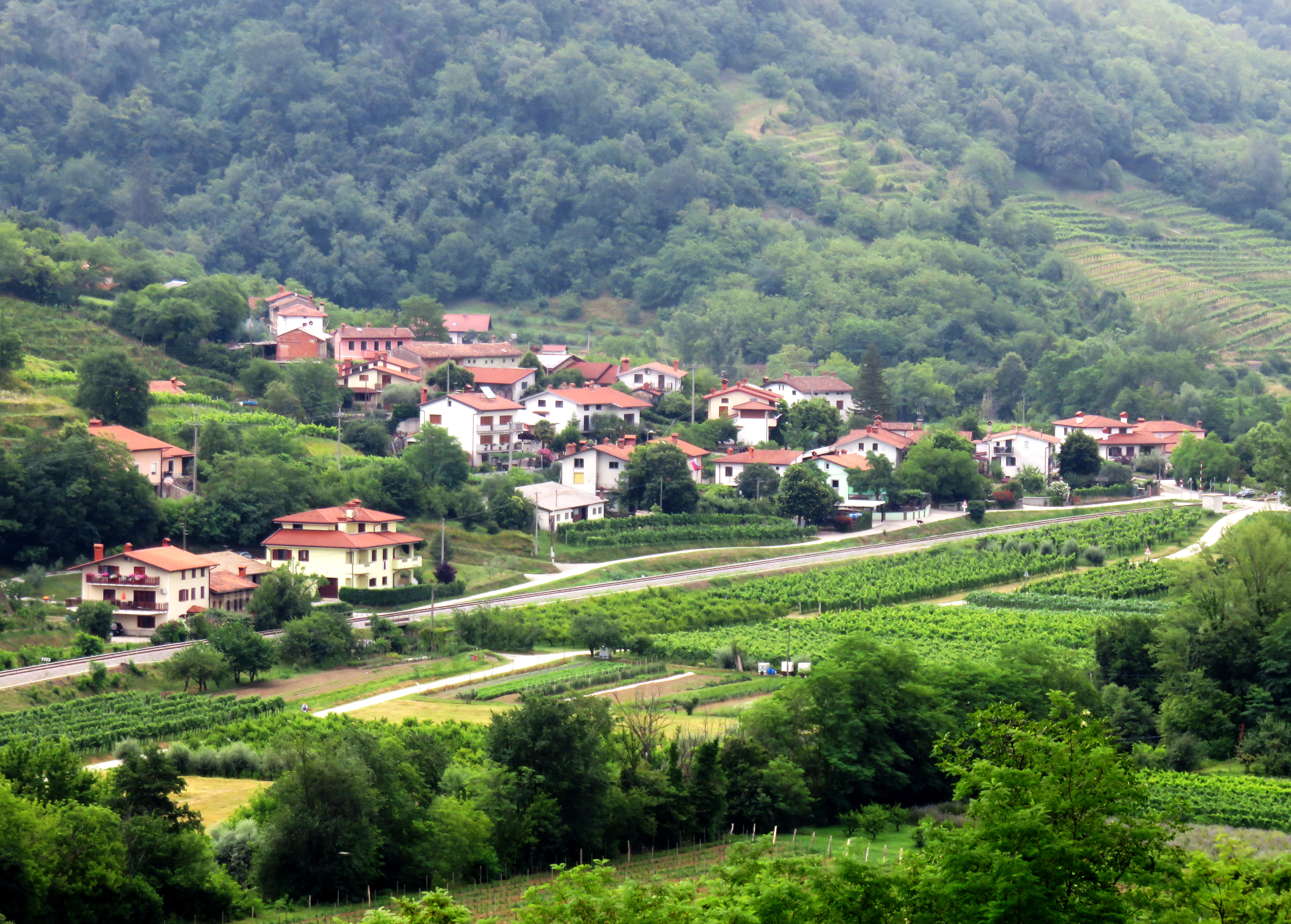

- Location in Slovenia
- Coordinates: 45°52′44.57″N 13°45′16.61″E
- Country: Slovenia
- Traditional region: Slovenian Littoral
- Statistical region: Gorizia
- Municipality: Nova Gorica

Area
  - Total: 0.37 km^{2} (0.14 sq mi)
- Elevation: 77.5 m (254 ft)

Population (2002)
  - Total: 100

Saksid (pronounced [ˈsaːksit]; Italian: Sasseto) is a village near Dornberk in the Vipava Valley in western Slovenia in the Municipality of Nova Gorica.
