= Štjak =

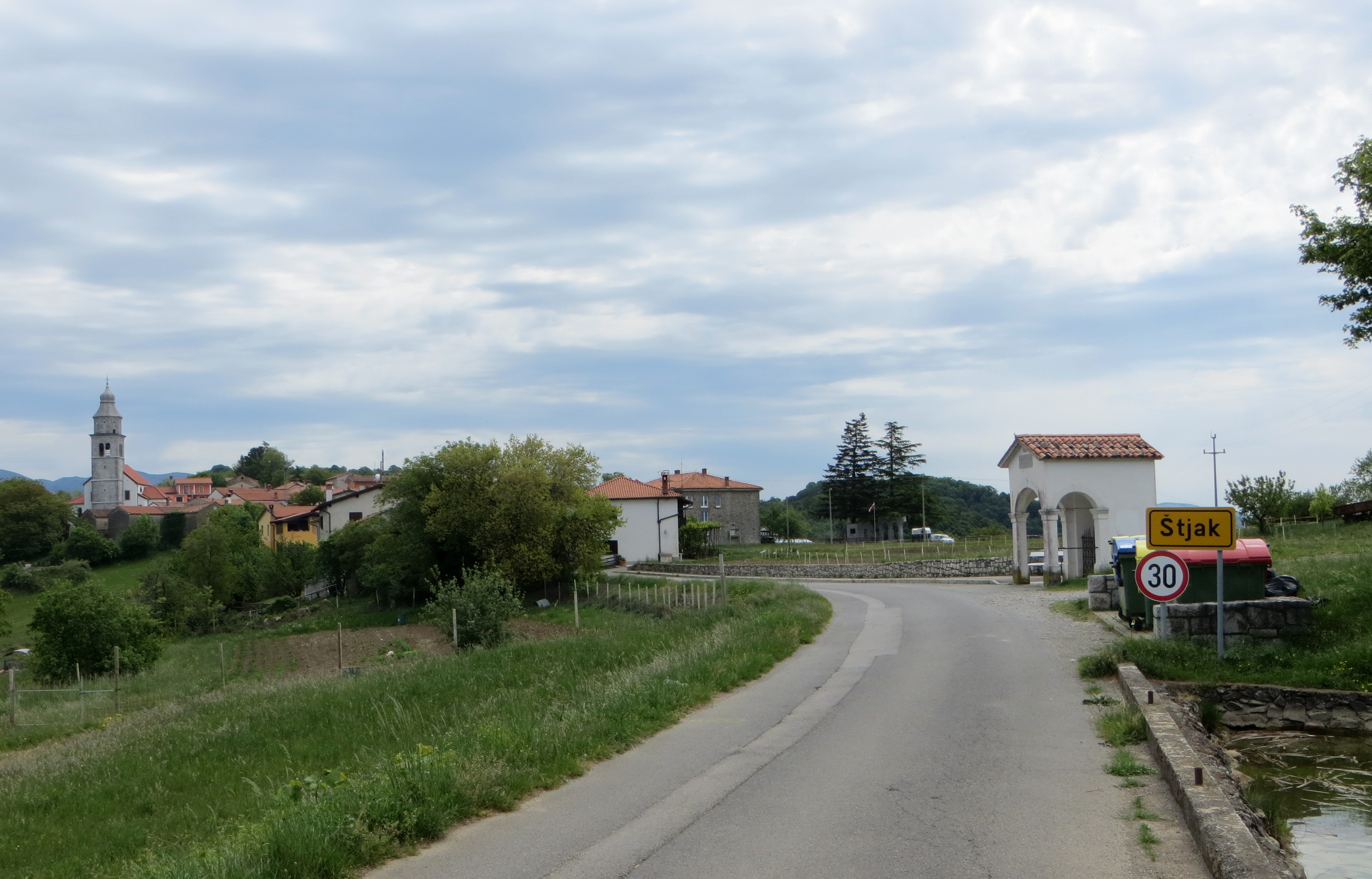

- Location in Slovenia
- Coordinates: 45°47′42.07″N 13°54′20.52″E
- Country: Slovenia
- Traditional region: Littoral
- Statistical region: Coastal–Karst
- Municipality: Sežana

Area
  - Total: 1.74 km^{2} (0.67 sq mi)
- Elevation: 518.1 m (1,700 ft)

Population (2002)
  - Total: 50

Štjak (pronounced [ˈʃtjaːk]; Italian: San Giacomo in Colle) is a village in the Municipality of Sežana in the Littoral region of Slovenia.

== Name ==
The settlement was first mentioned in written sources circa 1400 as bey sand Jacob. The Slovene name Štjak is a contraction of š(en)t Jak(ob) 'Saint James', to whom the local church is dedicated.

== Church ==
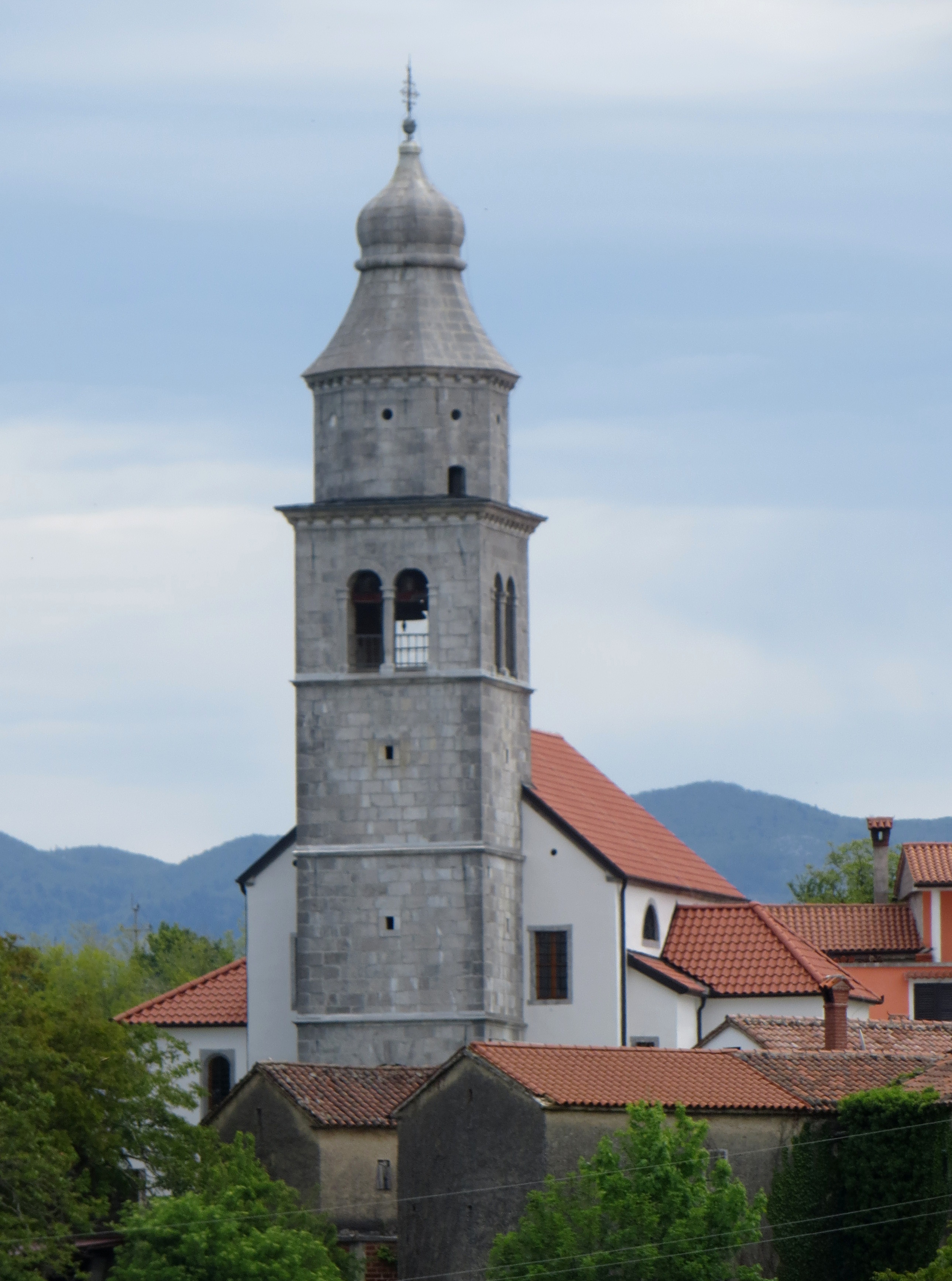
Saint James's Church

The parish church in the settlement is dedicated to Saint James and belongs to the Diocese of Koper.
