= Potok pri Dornberku =

Potok pri Dornberku Potok (until 1955)
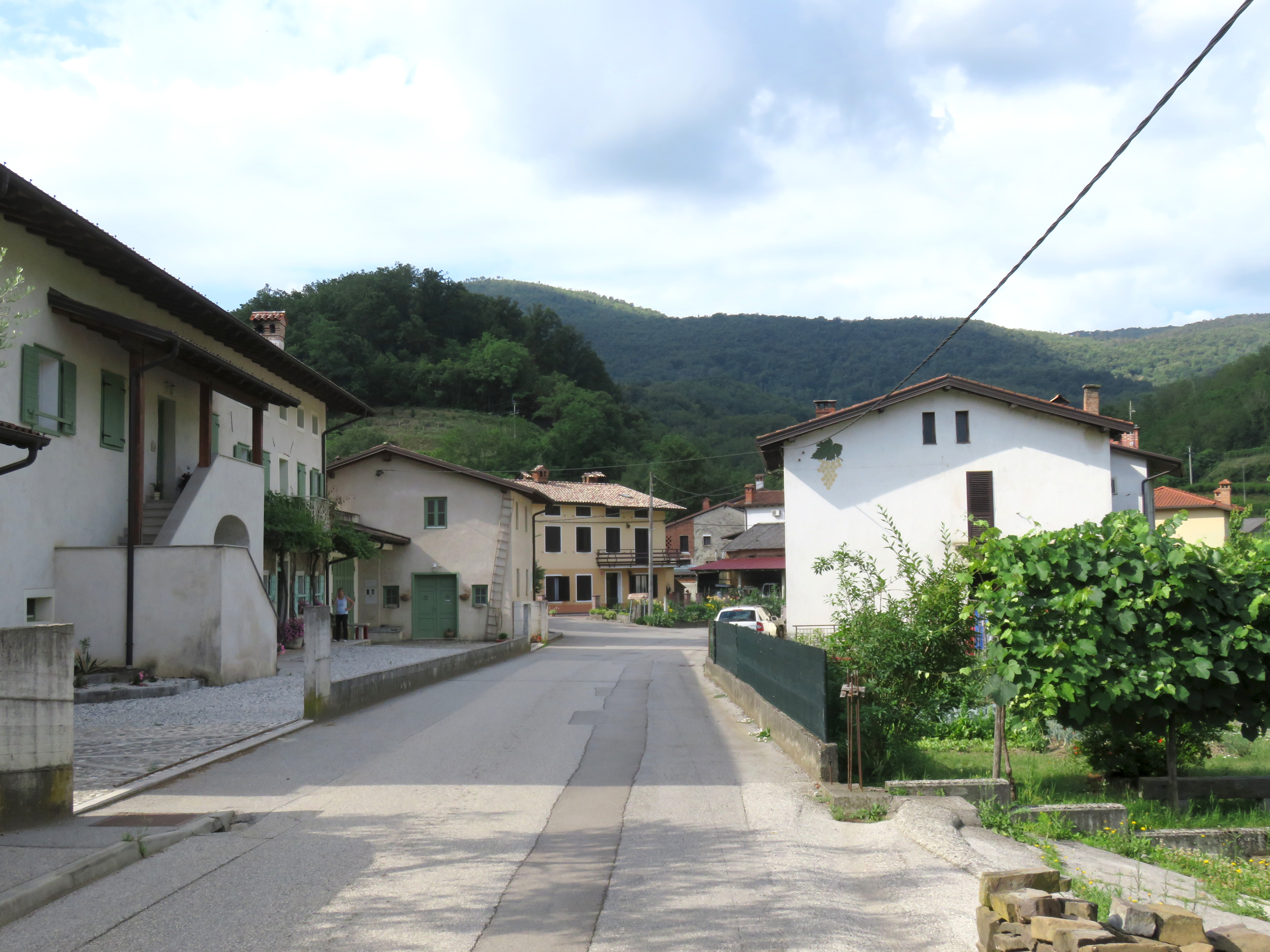

- Location in Slovenia
- Coordinates: 45°52′47.7″N 13°44′7.9″E
- Country: Slovenia
- Traditional region: Slovenian Littoral
- Statistical region: Gorizia
- Municipality: Nova Gorica

Area
  - Total: 5.2 km^{2} (2.0 sq mi)
- Elevation: 69.5 m (228 ft)

Population (2002)
  - Total: 133

Potok pri Dornberku (pronounced [ˈpɔːtɔk pɾi ˈdoːɾnbɛɾku]) is a small settlement south of Dornberk in the Municipality of Nova Gorica in western Slovenia. It is located in the Vipava Valley, which is part of the Gorizia region of the Slovene Littoral.

== Name ==
The name of the settlement was changed from Potok to Potok pri Dornberku in 1955.
