= Zalošče =

Village in Slovene Littoral, Slovenia

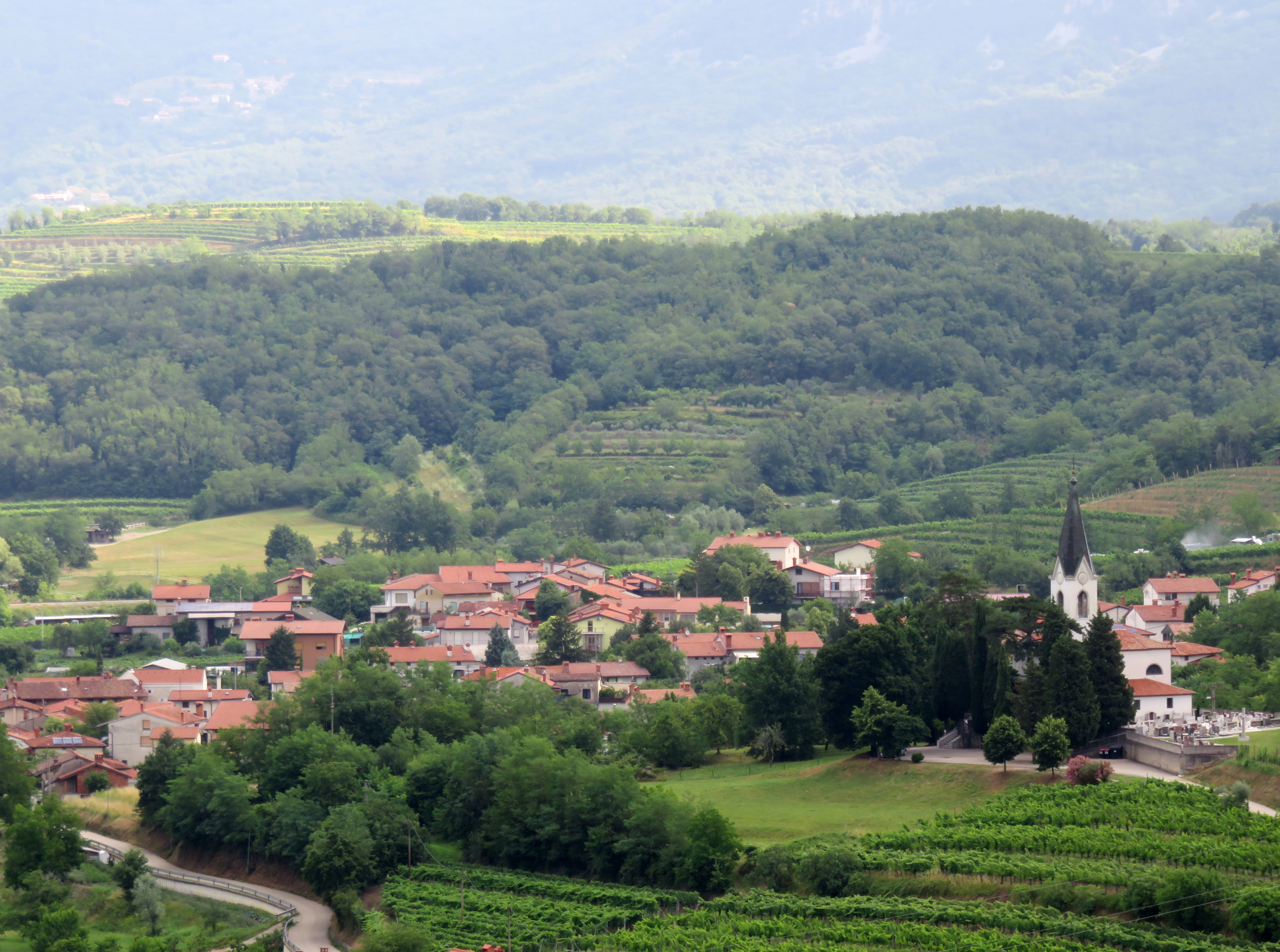

- Location in Slovenia
- Coordinates: 45°53′15.09″N 13°44′53.21″E
- Country: Slovenia
- Traditional region: Slovenian Littoral
- Statistical region: Gorizia
- Municipality: Nova Gorica

Area
  - Total: 2.35 km^{2} (0.91 sq mi)
- Elevation: 81.7 m (268 ft)

Population (2002)
  - Total: 387

Zalošče (pronounced [ˈzaːlɔʃtʃɛ]) is a village in western Slovenia in the Municipality of Nova Gorica. It is located in the lower Vipava Valley in the Gorizia region of the Slovene Littoral.

== History ==
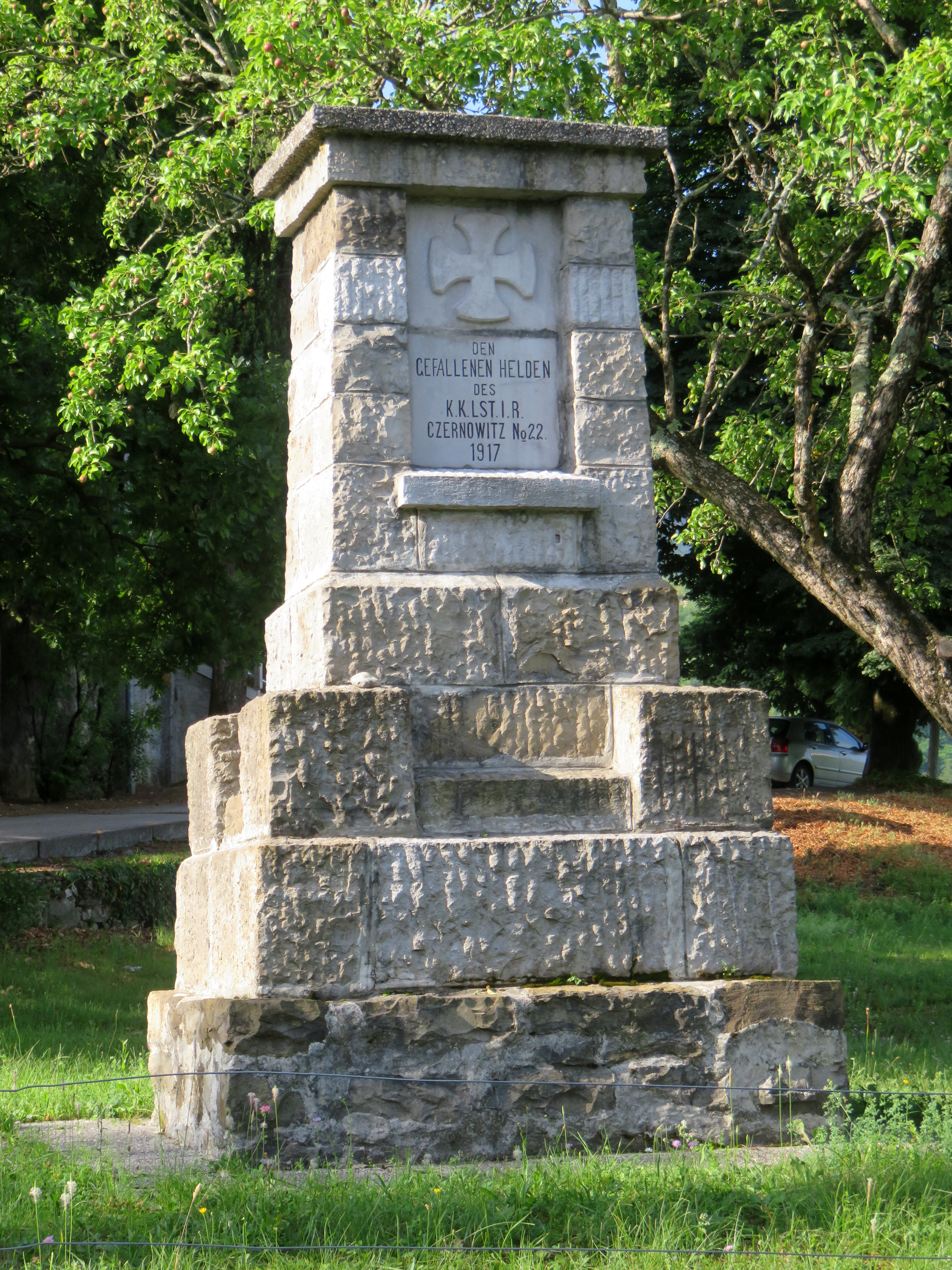
Austro-Hungarian First World War cemetery

In the northern part of the village, there is a large building that used to be a monastery in the 16th and 17th centuries. There is an Austro-Hungarian military cemetery from the First World War on a small hill next to Saint Lawrence's Church. The individual grave markers are no longer present, and only the central monument remains.

== Church ==
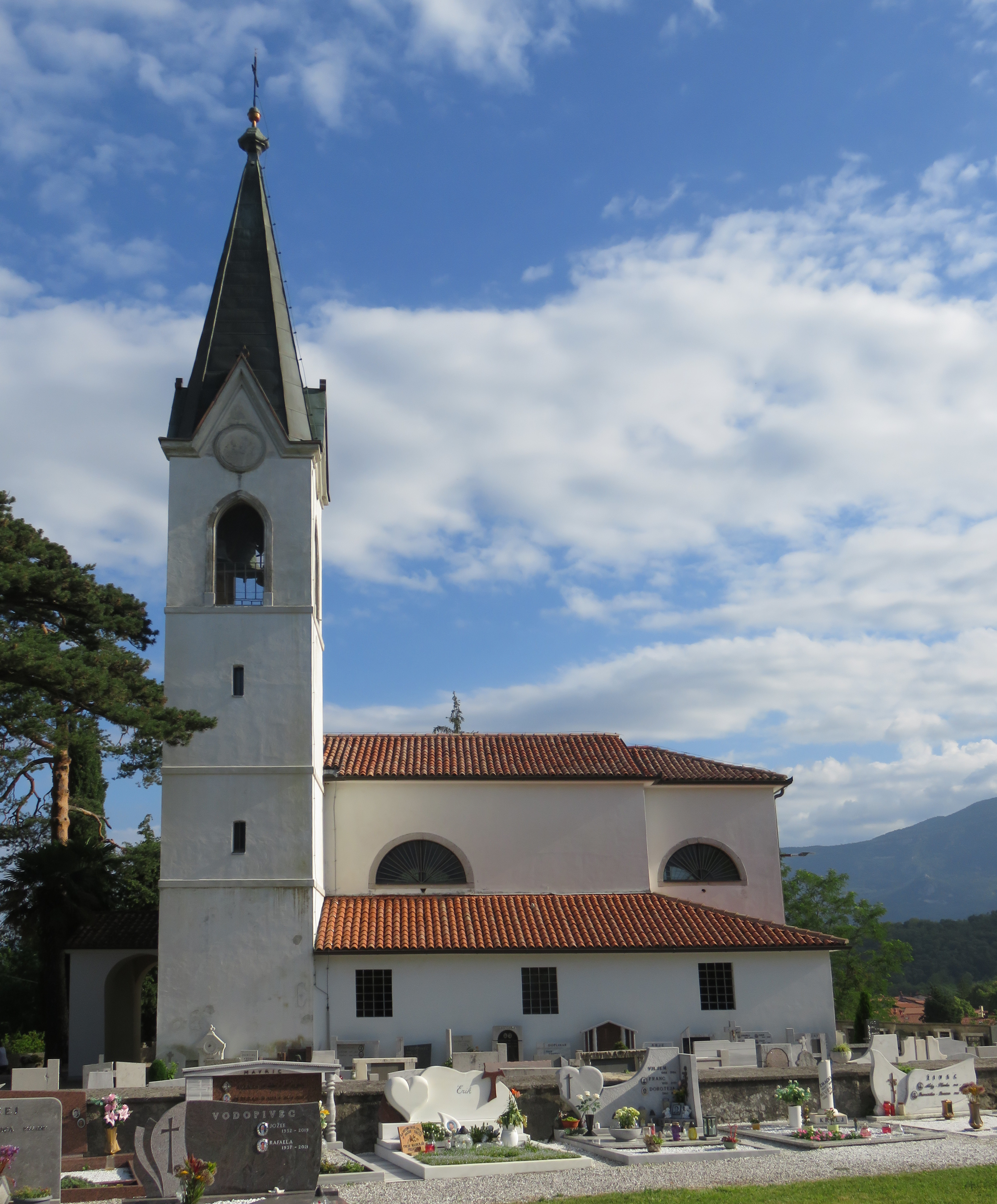
View from the south

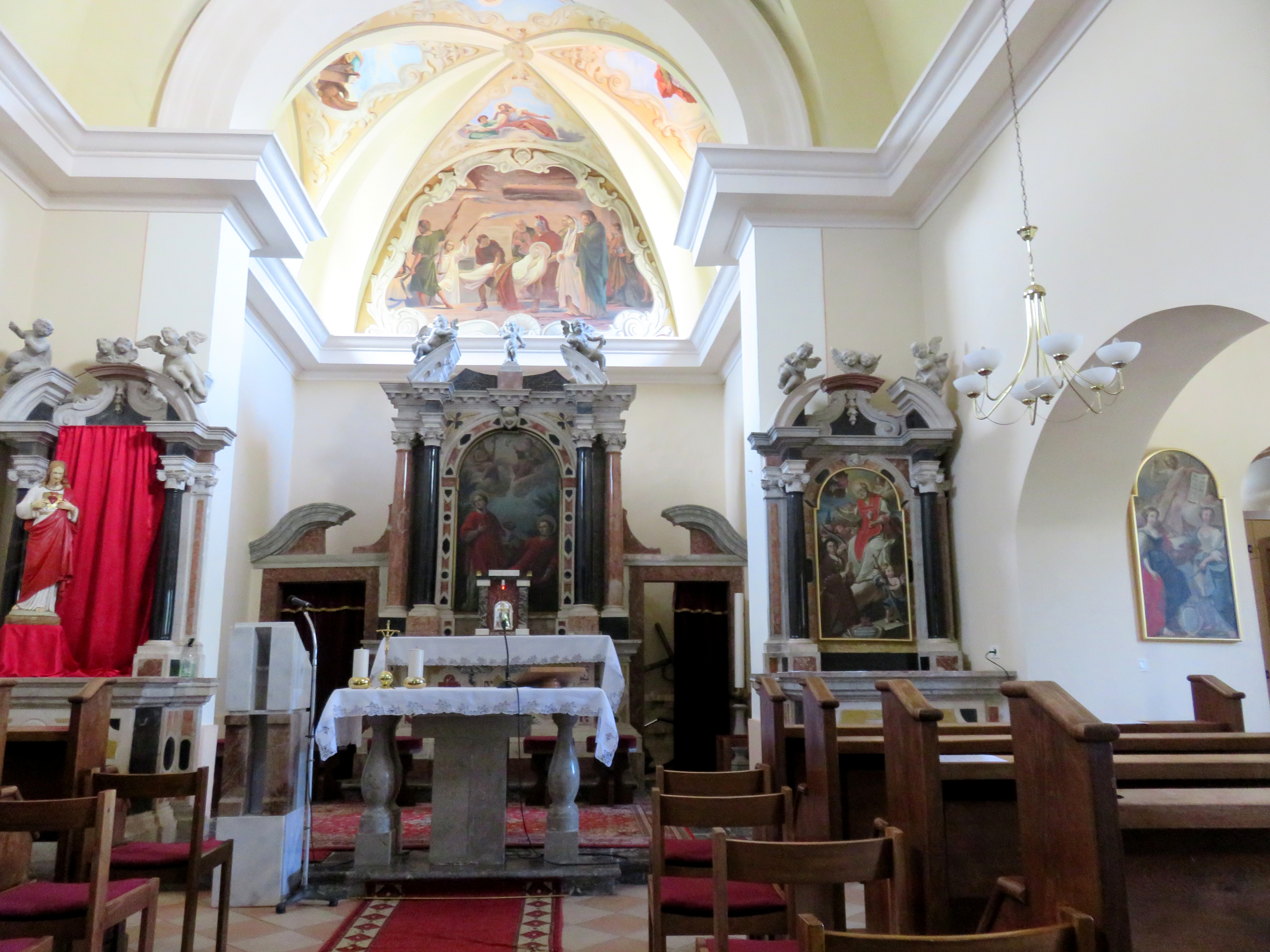
Church interior

Saint Lawrence's Church

The local church is dedicated to Saint Lawrence and belongs to the Parish of Dornberk.

== Notable people ==
Notable people that were born or lived in Zalošče include:

- Rafael Rojic (1844–1927), physician and politician
- Ivan Rejec (1878–1958), sociologist and translator
