= Tabor, Nova Gorica =

Tabor
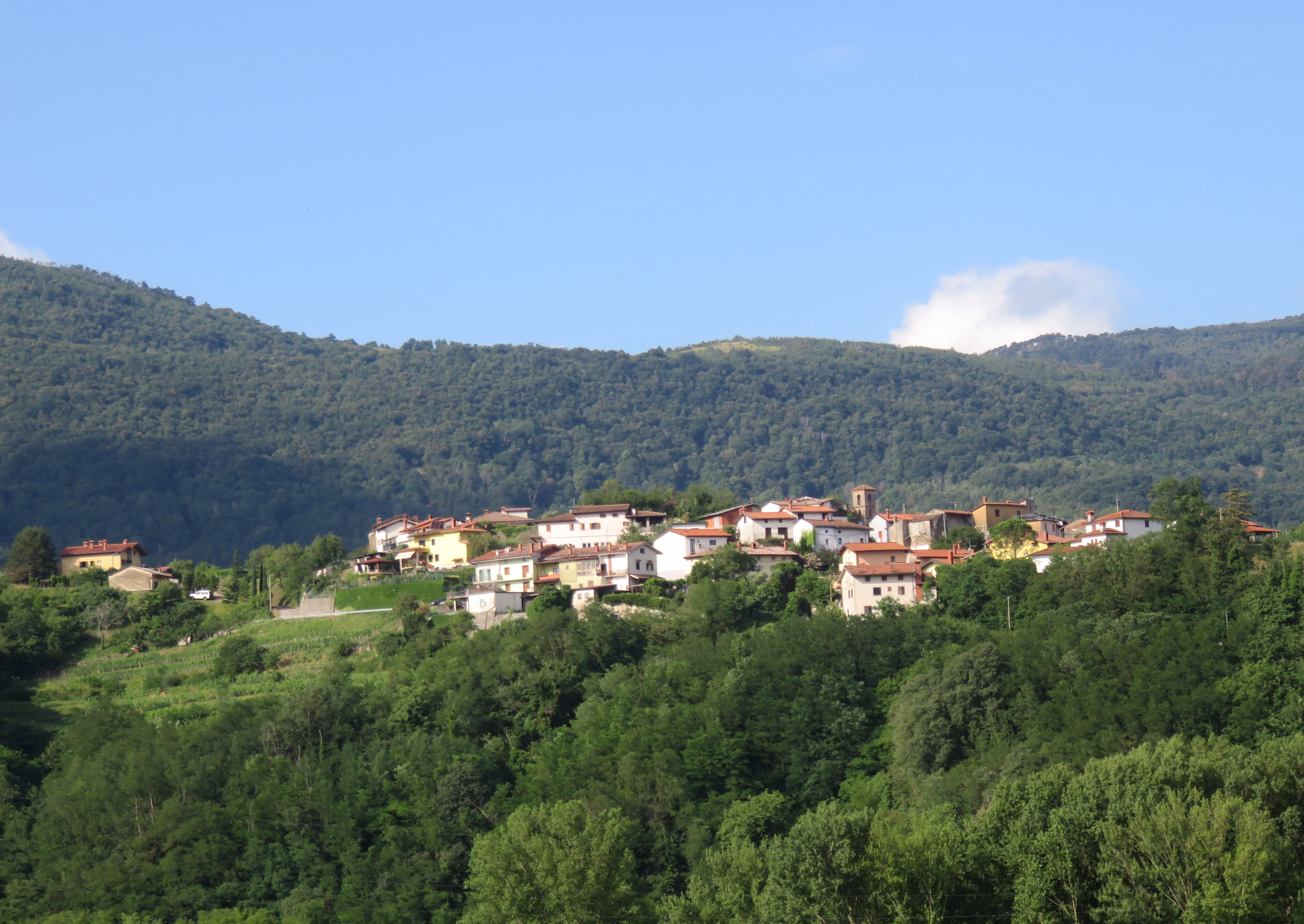

- Location in Slovenia
- Coordinates: 45°52′47.87″N 13°44′23.21″E
- Country: Slovenia
- Traditional region: Slovenian Littoral
- Statistical region: Gorizia
- Municipality: Nova Gorica

Area
  - Total: 0.98 km^{2} (0.38 sq mi)
- Elevation: 134.7 m (442 ft)

Population (2002)
  - Total: 165

Tabor (pronounced [ˈtaːbɔɾ]) is a village in western Slovenia in the Municipality of Nova Gorica. It is located on a small hill overlooking the Vipava Valley. The name comes from the Slovene term tabor, denoting a fortified church or village. The village was fortified in the 16th century as a defense against the Ottoman raids. Part of the fortifications are still visible today.

Tabor gravitates towards the village of Dornberk.
