= Povir =

- Location in Slovenia
- Coordinates: 45°41′56.35″N 13°55′57.55″E
- Country: Slovenia
- Traditional region: Littoral
- Statistical region: Coastal–Karst
- Municipality: Sežana

Area
  - Total: 4.22 km^{2} (1.63 sq mi)
- Elevation: 401 m (1,316 ft)

Population (2002)
  - Total: 333

Povir (pronounced [pɔˈʋiːɾ] or [ˈpɔːʋiɾ]; Italian: Poverio) is a village in the Municipality of Sežana in the Littoral region of Slovenia. It includes the hamlets of Britof, Dulanja Vas (Slovene: Dulanja vas), and Guranja Vas (Slovene: Guranja vas).

== Geography ==
Prominent elevations near the village include Stari Tabor Hill (603 m) and Tabor Hill (525 m). The name Stari Tabor (literally, 'old fortress') comes from an old fortified settlement from the late Bronze Age and beginning of the Iron Age at the top of Stari Tabor Hill.

== Name ==
Povir was mentioned in written sources circa 1400 and in 1412 as Pouir (and as Vofier in 1485). The name is believed to be derived from a common noun containing the root vir 'spring', perhaps referring to crevasses in the area that become springs after heavy rain. The name is probably not derived from the Slovene common noun povir 'grapevine' (< Venetian Italian pavera).

== History ==
Povir is built on top of the remains of an ancient Roman settlement, and many archaeological objects have been found in this area. It is also well known for the medieval tower (Slovene: tabor) built on top of Tabor Hill. It was built at the end of the 15th century by the lords of Švarcenek Castle to protect the villagers against Ottoman raids. By the end of the 17th century, the old tower had lost its functionality and began to fall down. During the Second World War, German soldiers finally destroyed it fighting against the Slovene Partisans. In April 2014, Juan P. Maschio began to study the old fortress and he virtually reconstructed it for Projekt Feniks (under the project code FKS03-PV, Tabor Povir).

== Churches ==
The parish church, built on the outskirts of the settlement in the hamlet of Britof, is dedicated to Saint Peter and belongs to the Diocese of Koper. It is a single-nave structure dating from the 17th century with an octagonal chancel walled on three sides and a four-story bell tower at the entrance built in the Aquileian style. The chapel and sacristy were built in 1775. The church has a slate roof and the interior furnishings are Baroque. A second church north of the railroad in the centre of the village is dedicated to Saint James. It is a Baroque structure with a polygonal chancel walled on three sides and a higher, wider rectangular nave. There is a bell gable over the entrance. The chancel is barrel vaulted and the nave has a flat painted ceiling. The church has a stone Baroque altar.

== Notable people ==
Notable people that were born or lived in Povir include:

- Matija Sila (1840–1925), local historian
