= Co-Cathedral of Christ the Saviour, Nova Gorica =

Coordinates: 45.9601°N 13.6507°E

Co-Cathedral of Christ the Saviour
- Stolna cerkev Kristus Odrešenik
- Co-Cathedral of Christ the Saviour
- Location: Nova Gorica
- Country: Slovenia
- Denomination: Roman Catholic Church

The Co-Cathedral of Christ the Saviour (Slovene: Stolna cerkev Kristus Odrešenik), also called Nova Gorica Cathedral, is the name given to a religious building that is affiliated with the Catholic Church and serves as the co-cathedral or alternate cathedral of the Diocese of Koper. It is located in Nova Gorica, a city in the European country of Slovenia. It was built in 1982 by architect Franc Kvaternik project. Inside the image of Christ and the cross made of wood, painted by Stane Jarm.

On March 15, 2004, during the pontificate of Pope John Paul II the church was declared co-cathedral of the diocese with the decree "Ut spirituali" of the Congregation for Bishops (Congregatio pro Episcopis).

== See also ==
- Roman Catholicism in Slovenia
- Assumption Cathedral, Koper
- Cathedral of Christ the Saviour
