= Brdo, Nova Gorica =

Brdo
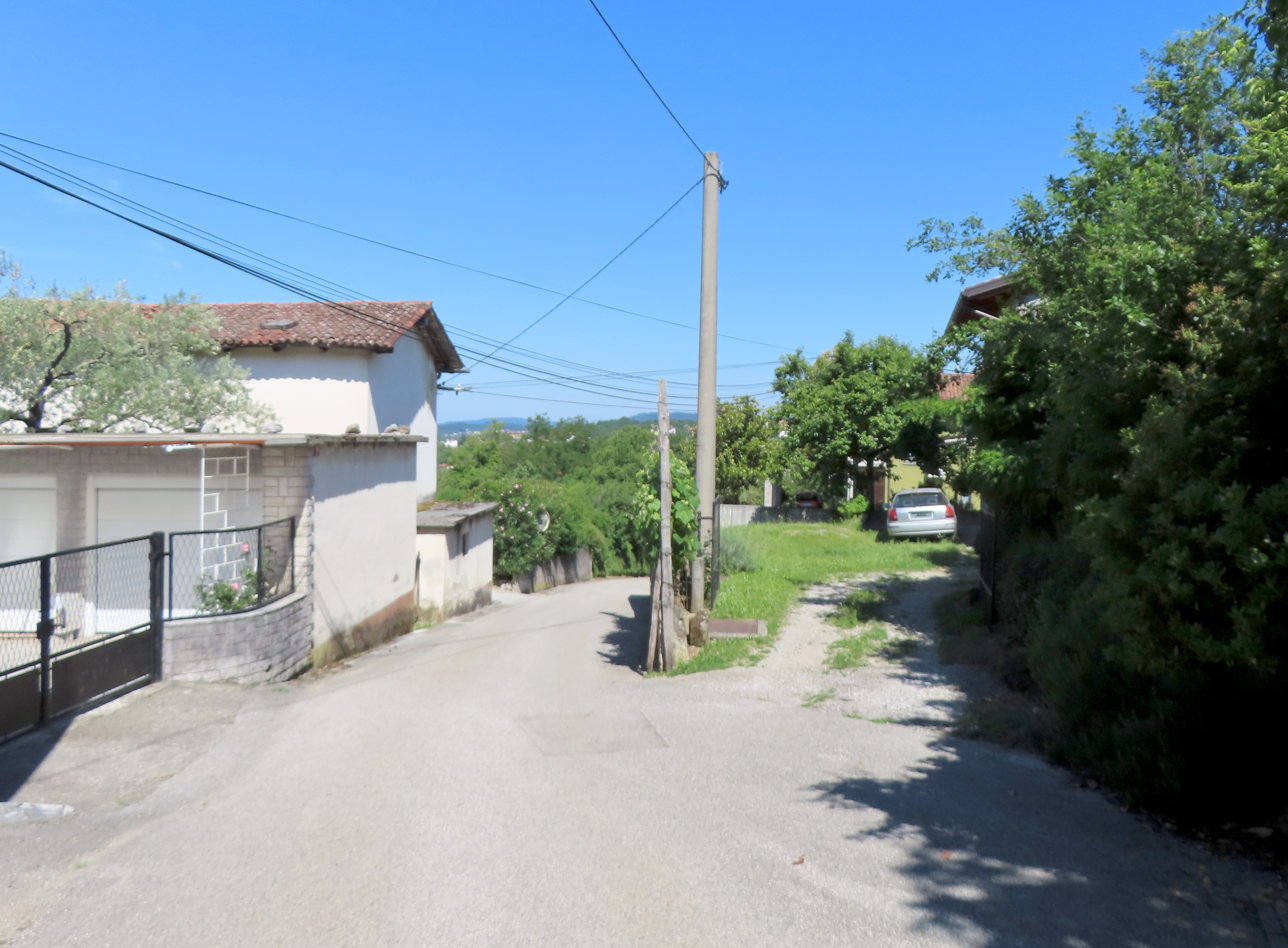

- Location in Slovenia
- Coordinates: 45°53′1.43″N 13°43′49.5″E
- Country: Slovenia
- Traditional region: Slovenian Littoral
- Statistical region: Gorizia
- Municipality: Nova Gorica

Area
  - Total: 0.51 km^{2} (0.20 sq mi)
- Elevation: 101.9 m (334 ft)

Population (2002)
  - Total: 67

Brdo (pronounced [ˈbəɾdɔ]; Italian: Berdo) is a settlement in western Slovenia in the Municipality of Nova Gorica. It is located in the Vipava Valley, near the village of Dornberk.
