= Draga, Nova Gorica =

Draga
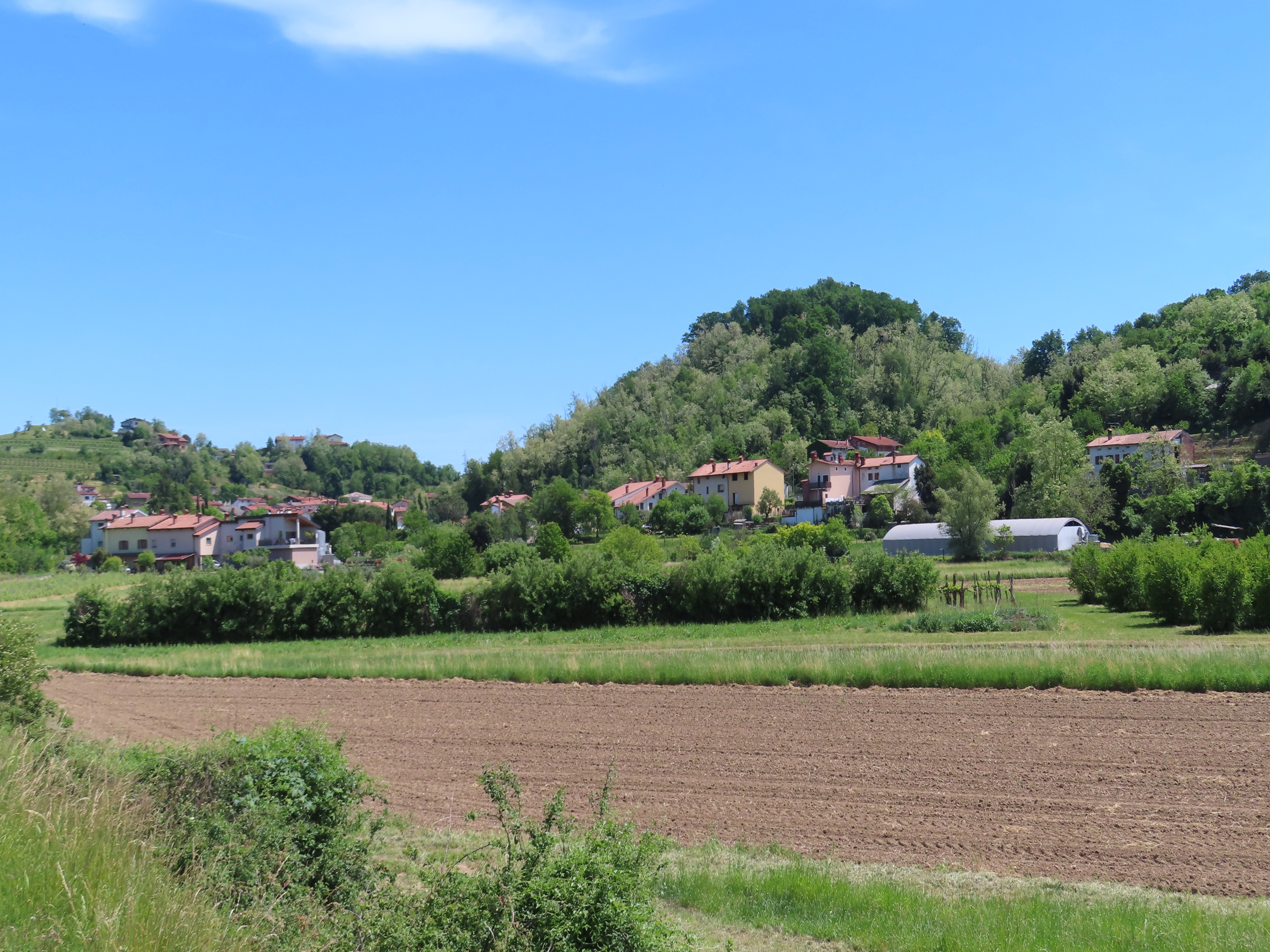

- Location in Slovenia
- Coordinates: 45°53′7.03″N 13°43′57.73″E
- Country: Slovenia
- Traditional region: Slovenian Littoral
- Statistical region: Gorizia
- Municipality: Nova Gorica

Area
  - Total: 0.32 km^{2} (0.12 sq mi)
- Elevation: 60.7 m (199 ft)

Population (2002)
  - Total: 90

Draga (pronounced [ˈdɾaːɡa]) is a small settlement next to Dornberk in the Municipality of Nova Gorica in western Slovenia. It is located in the Vipava Valley in the Gorizia region.

== Name ==
The name Draga is derived from the Slovene common noun draga 'small, narrow valley', referring to the geographical location of the settlement.
