= Budihni =

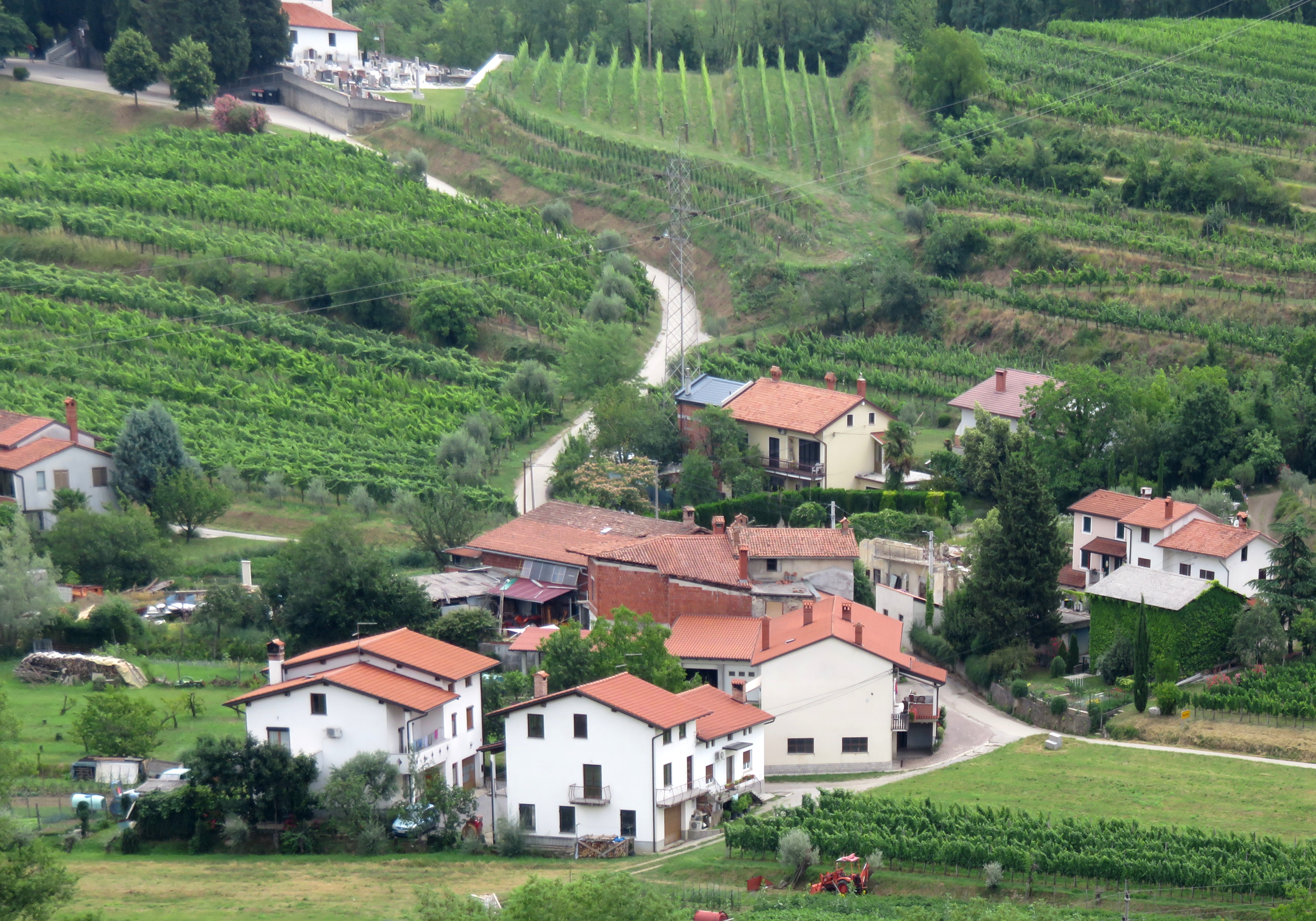

- Location in Slovenia
- Coordinates: 45°53′2.28″N 13°44′37.26″E
- Country: Slovenia
- Traditional region: Slovenian Littoral
- Statistical region: Gorizia
- Municipality: Nova Gorica

Area
  - Total: 0.44 km^{2} (0.17 sq mi)
- Elevation: 64.8 m (213 ft)

Population (2002)
  - Total: 44

Budihni (pronounced [buˈdiːxni]) is a small settlement on the right bank of the Vipava River southeast of Dornberk in the Municipality of Nova Gorica in western Slovenia.
