= Dernberg =

Mountain in Namibia and South Africa

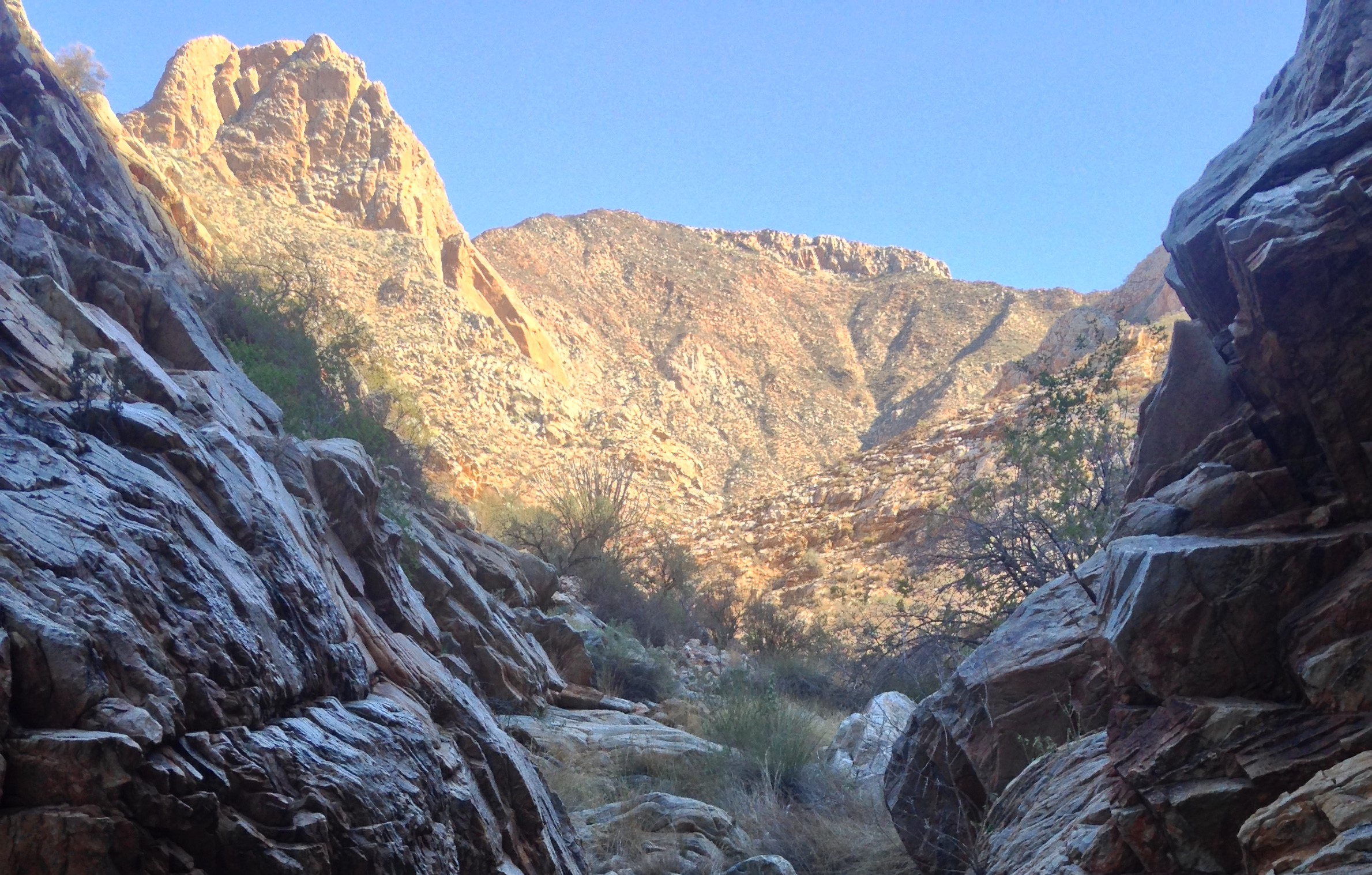
- Dernberg peak from Zebrawater riverbed

Highest point
- Elevation: 790 m (2,590 ft)
- Coordinates: 28°27′51″S 17°8′30″E

Geography
- Location within South Africa
- Location: Northern Cape, South Africa

The Dernberg is one of the most notable mountains in the Richtersveld and the Ais/Richtersveld Transfrontier Park, on the border between South Africa and Namibia. This region is noted for its extreme dryness (bordered by the Kalahari, the Namib and the Karoo deserts) and Dernberg is an important landmark in the Zebrawater watershed that ultimately feeds into the Orange River, South Africa's biggest river.

The mountain is 790 metres high, so while far from the tallest mountain the area (the Vandersterberg is 1362 metres), it is one of the steepest and most recognisable peaks that one sees during the popular Vensterval Trail hike through the park. It is not frequently climbed, due to the steep and crumbly rock at its peak, but it makes a great Grade 4 scramble (South African system scrambling grade) for experienced scramblers.

The mountain is also one of the best locations to find the enchanting halfmens ('half-human') tree.
