= Vito of Dornberg =

16th-century Italian diplomat

Vito, Baron of Dornberg or Vid von Dornberg (Italian: Vito di Dorimbergo; Slovene: Vid Dornberški) (?.1529 – 5 April 1591) was born in Görz, Holy Roman Empire, the last son of Erasmo of Dornberg and Beatrice Loser, a south Tyrolean woman. He had five siblings, two brothers and three sisters. He was County Captain of Gorizia (sheriff) and a diplomat at the Austrian service.

== Family Origin ==
The Dornbergs, of Bavarian origin, were in the service of the Count of Gorizia as early as the 13th century, receiving in return for their services a fief on the Vipava Valley which they named after the family, Dornberg, now Dornberk in Slovenia. Between 1300 and 1400 some Dornbergs held the administrative office of county Captain in Gorizia. In 1547 the family added to its possession the village of San Floriano del Collio – Števerjan and Dorneck Castle,, and on 19 April 1578 the family was ennobled by Rudolf II.

== Early life ==
At the beginning of 1500, both Vito's father and uncle were in the Habsburg service, during the war against the Venetians. Vito's uncle, Leonard, died in 1508 defending the Gorizia Castle, while his father Erasmus, led the Imperial vanguards, entering Udine and in 1514, Erasmus of Dornberg had been the County Lieutenant before the war, a position he was to regain after the war. Vito was born at Gorizia Castle in 1529, inside the still existing Dornberg house, now the seat of WW1 Museum; the day after his birth his father Erasmus died. With the loss of Erasmus the family soon entered into a bad finance situation, as the Dornberg's had to make payment in advance to support the administration of the county, awaiting the Habsburg rulers to paid them back; however the Habsburg were notorious for being bad creditors. Therefore, the young twenty-six-year old widow faced terrible times after the death of her husband, but she stood upon her dignity and repaid her husband debts even using her personal funds, giving also the adequate education, in accordance with their social status, to her children. Maximilian and Franz were sent to Ljubljana to attend the Carniolan school, while Vito, received his education at home under the supervision of a priest. In 1541 he was studying in Trento, completing his education in Verona. In 1545 he admitted at the University of Padua, where his eldest brother, Maximilian had also matriculated failing the graduation. Vito was generally a good student and became fluent in many languages, beside his native Italian, German, Latin, Spanish and Slovenian, although it is not clear, if he had a full command of German.

== Career in Habsburg service ==
By the 1540s the family wealth and prestige had been almost restored, with the help and protection of County Captain, Francesco Vito della Torre, and with a good marriage policy. On 12 January 1540 Ferdinand I (10 March 1503 – 25 July 1564) Holy Roman Emperor granted to Erasmus’ descendants the same noble statues of the main family lineage. Vito's eldest sister, Ann, married her cousin Francis of Dornberg, the eldest member of the main family branch, therefore reuniting the family cadet branch with the main branch. The other brothers and sisters had good marriages too. Vito's marriage was directly arranged by Francesco della Torre wife's, Bianca Simonetta, who married Vito in 1551, to her niece Rachel Malvasia, a young widow, allaying Vito to the Malvasia of Bologna and Simonetta of Milan families. Before his marriage Vito underwent the usual training that all nobles wishing to enter in the Habsburg service had to complete. In 1550 he was at service of Bernard of Ortemburg, a relative of Gabriel of Salamanca – Ortenburg an advisor of Charles V and his brother Ferdinand. With Ortenburg, Vito, attended the Imperial diet of Augusta where Charles V, delivered his decisions over his own succession.

In 1551 he went to Fiume non Rijeka in Croatia, where all the Inner Austrian provinces met to decide the strategy over a common defense plan to face the Turkish invasion. In July 1551 he was nominated by Francesco della Torre, deputy County Captain, a choice backed up by Ferdinand, who also nominated him, Royal Advisor [12]. In 1553 Francesco della Torre had left the captaincy vacant, having been nominated, High Butler or Obersthofmeister, at Archduke Ferdinand service. Vito at 24, was Lieutenant General in charge of the Gorizia County, and war commissar of Friuli, an office he would held for almost 15 years. During this time he was the real ruler of the County as Francesco della Torre was serving the Archduke. His de facto ruling power was not affected even when George, Francesco della Torre son's, was appointed County Captain Vicar in 1536. His brothers Maximilian and Franz also held public offices. Franz often filled in, during Vito absences, especially in the last part of the 1550s, when Vito was the tenant of the County Land Register or Urbario. Maximilian helped his brother and gained experience and in 1560, thanks to his high competences in Law practicing, he was selected to be a member of the board called to reform the General Provincial States assembly, and was also as a diplomatic envoy to Venice[14].

By the end 1550s the Dornberg family had grown more powerful than ever, causing jealousy among their fellow citizens. The rumors of a possible Dornberg embezzlement arrived in Vienna, and a secret investigation was ordered. Vito emerged quite clean from the enquiry, also thanks to Francesco della Torre help, and the Emperor Ferdinand assigned him an annual pension of one-hundred Florins, subsequently doubled. However, in 1564 Vito had to face new accusations as the Archduke Charles II Francis of Austria, had succeeded his father in the Inner Austria government. This time Vito personally rushed to Graz, the new Inner Austria Provincial Capital seat, to prove his innocence, and returned to Gorizia, completely cleared from the accusations, and with a new appointment as a member of the Aulic Council (one of the two supreme courts of the Holy Roman Empire). In 1558 the City of Gorizia came again under the threat of a Turkish attack and Vito supervised the construction of a new bulwark around the castle.

On 28 September 1563, in Pressburg, present day Bratislava in the Slovak Republic, Ferdinand I, made Vito a Knight of the Golden Spur of the Holy Roman Empire (equites aurati Sancti Romani Imperii). In 1565 Beatrice Loser, Vito's mother, died, and the family was deeply touched by the event. To honour her memory a pamphlet was dedicated, containing verses in both Italian and Latin. The manuscript was lately printed in Brescia in 1568, and included a sonnet composed by Torquato Tasso. The death of Beatrice Loser was also a chance to enhance the power and wealth of the family as her personal belongings were added to the family fortune, and their coat-of-arm, an aloe plant in a golden pot, could be enriched with a “ Red-Lion with a yoke in the hand, part of the noble and old family of the Lords of the Yoke of Tyrol County. The bestowal was granted on 26 April 1567 by Ferdinand II, Archduke of Further Austria at Innsbruck. The same year the city of Gorizia received the visit of the Archduke Charles, and improvement works, including paving the present Victory Square at the time known as Travnik, were started. However, one of the biggest tasks the County administrators had to accomplish, was the funding for the defense against the Turkish raids.

In 1557 – 1558 Vito of Dornberg advised the central Government to impose a tribute on the vine selling to raise money. The new tax, of four Carantas on every Ornas (about 66 liters), become soon unpopular because most of the burden fell on the lower classes, as the tax applied directly on the quantity, and not on the quality, of the vines. Dornberg always maintained a firm stance on the tax he had devised, and when possibly minor riots were expected, he advised some “Hangings” to quell the rebellion and restore order. As a son of his times, Vito always maintained a certain degree of hostility toward the lower classes, whom he accused to be tax evaders. To be fair to him, it must be remembered that he used the same zeal with his social class members. In fact in 1572, he wrote a report to the Archduke, in which he stated that “… the County territory is little, and all the nobles are related and willing to help each other’s… Even tax collectors do not care to pay the debts they have with the government … “ in 1561 Vito proposed drastic measures against Ecclesiastic benefits, who did not fulfill their payments of Government taxes, but the project was meant to fail due to the Church influence in politics and its staunch opposition. However, he did not give up, and in 1565, the church and confraternity managers, were forced to submit to the let the County inspectors their registry records. In some cases the controls were carried out with the force.

By the 1560s the wind of Lutheran reformation arrived in Gorizia through the nearby County of Carniola. Primož Trubar, the Slovenian Protestant reformer, was expelled from the city, but the seed of the reformation was now planted, and few eminent persons in Gorizia were fascinated by Reformation idea, among them, the Vicar County Captain, Georg della Torre, Annibale d’Eck, Lorenzo Lanthieri, and Vito's brother in law, Francesco of Dornberg with his son, Erasmus. Vito remained a good Catholic anyway although, he kept his firm stance in imposing taxes on the catholic institutions. His loyalty to the church was never questioned even when he had to deal with the quarrel between the Archduke Charles, and the Aquileia Patriarch, when owing to an agreement, the old Friuli religious centre, was annexed in the inner Austria territories, causing the Serenissima enragement, who could not tolerate the loss of such territories in favor of the old Austrian enemy. The clash between Austria and Venice seemed to be inevitable and in November 1565, Jacopo Maracco, the vicar of Patriarch Giovanni Grimani, called for a synod to settle the quarrel. Vito of Dornberg and the Bishop of Trieste, Andrea Rapicio, were sent at the council as Emperor envoys; their involvement managed to avoid the dangerous break, without renouncing to the royal prerogative. After the synod, Vito of Dornberg was nominated special envoy to the Roman Curia, to deal with issue. In January 1566, he was in Rome, and assisted to the coronation of Pope Pius V, with the Imperial Ambassador, Prospero d’Arco. However his mission did not solve completely the issue, and therefore the archdeaconry of Gorizia was to be instituted only in 1574. During his staying in Rome Vito, had time to make friendship with influent people, above all with, the powerful Imperial Ambassador, Prospero d’Arco.

== Ambassador to Venice ==
On his way back, he paid visit on behalf of his sovereign to the courts of Mantua and Ferrara. Vito arrived in Gorizia and resumed his duty as County lieutenant, but at the end of 1566 he was summoned to Vienna by Maximilian II, Holy Roman Emperor, and nominated ambassador to Venice to replace his deceased fellow citizen Francesco Giovanni della Torre. He received the ambassador credential in Brno, as the court had been moved there, on 21 January 1567. For his new assignment he was paid an annuity of 2,800 Florins. He took up office after having attended the visit of the Archduke Charles in Gorizia, on 12 April, and even if he hadn’t officially taken up the ambassador office yet, during the archduke's visit he had to face two important issues; the first was the Venetian Ambassador's vibrant protest for Uskoks' piracy against Venice, as the Uskoks of Segna, now Senij in Croatia, were Austrian subjects, while the second, more formal than real, came up when the Patriarchal Vicar, Maracco, in his salutation speech referred to the Patriarch of Aquileia as the sole and only Lord of Aquileia, causing the protest of the audience and almost a diplomatic incident. It took all Vito's art of diplomacy to avoid the Patriarchal Vicar being sent away from the royal visit celebrations.

On 17 April 1567 Vito of Dornberg paid a farewell visit to the Provincial States and boarded a ship at Aquileia harbor, arriving in Venice, after two days of sailing, and officially taking office as ambassador on 19 January 1567. In accordance with his instructions Vito represented in Venice, Maximilian II, and his brothers Ferdinand and Charles. At the time, Venice was an important diplomatic seat, and due to her role in the Mediterranean policy an important source of information. Vito wrote to the Austrian Capitals, weekly reports, in Latin at first, but soon he started using the Italian language, while very few reports were written in German. Incoming correspondence from the Imperial Capital was always in Latin, while Graz used German. In one of his reports, dated 8 January 1569, Vito informed the Emperor that Venice needed an estimated number of 20,000 bovines to satisfy her yearly meat supply, informing that Venice mainland domains weren’t able to meet the request. He therefore suggested that a good fiscal policy would have favored the import of cattle from the Danube lands, through the Gorizia County, adding that the operation would have had a positive profit for the Imperial finance. His suggestion was approved and reopened the trail from the Danube lands of Hungary and Austria to Gorizia, where the cattle after crossing the Isonzo River at Lucinico arrived in Venice across the Friuli plains. Even in 1586, at the peak of a crisis between the two countries, Vito plead the Archduke not to revoke the license arguing that its suspension, would have been considered an act-of-war by Venice, stressing that a suspension would have caused great loss of income.

== War against the Turks and the Uskoks ==
The Christian coalition, known as the Holy League, had been promoted by Pope Pius V, to rescue the Venetian colony of Famagusta, on the island of Cyprus, which was being besieged by the Turks in early 1571, subsequent to the fall of Nicosia, and other Venetian possessions in Cyprus in the course of the 1570s. Emperor Maximillian II of Austria had chosen to remain neutral, a stance he maintained even after the victorious Battle of Lepanto of 7 October 1571. Dornberg, along with other Austrian high officials and dignitaries, had always hoped that Austria would have entered into the League, to support the war effort against the Turks. When Pius V died in 1572, the cohesion of the League started to unravel, and both the Doge and the papal nuncio in Venice pressed Dornberg for Imperial intervention. Vito wrote detailed reports to Vienna, where he emphasized that the Republic could no longer support the war effort, as the expenses of maintaining the Venetian fleet had become too high, and that Venice, would most likely seek a separate peace; the peace treaty was eventually signed on 7 March 1573. With the war ended, Vito Dornberg went back to the usual tasks of his office; the most pressing of which was still Uskok piracy on the Northern Adriatic sea.

The Uskoks or "the ones who jumped in" ("the ones who ambushed") in Serbo-Croatian, were irregular soldiers on Austrian service of Slavic ancestry. Bands of Uskoks fought a guerrilla war against the Ottomans, and they formed small units and rowed swift boats. Since the Uskoks were checked on land and were rarely paid their annual subsidy, they resorted to acts of piracy, assaulting Venetian and Papal vessels. Besides this, the Uskoks were Austrian subjects, and the Serenissima was very upset and vividly protested with the Austrian authorities. Compensation requests arrived on Vito's desk in Venice, and he sent them to the Imperial Court attached to his reports, in which he stated that the Uskoks, were not just fighting the Turks but they were greedy for loot. Several unproductive meetings were held but no solution was found. As for Vito, he had made clear since the beginning that, the only possible solution for the problem was to deport the Uskoks from their stronghold of Segna into Croatia. His suggestion was dropped; however at the end of the century, another Gorizian Habsburg envoy, Giuseppe Rabatta, reminded Vito's plan, to solve the Uskoks issue, stating that...” we should have done what the late Dornberg ambassador used to say… raze and burn to the ground Segna, and deport the Uskoks to Otočac…”. The Uskok issue went ahead well into the 1580s. In 1587 the Republic of Venice, to protect her eastern border with the Austrian Empire, started the construction of the Fortress of Palmanova, 28 kilometres (17 mi) west of Gorizia, and on hearing that news, Vito recommended the enhancement of the Gradisca Fortress bastion, as a countermeasure.

== The Imperial policy in Italy ==
Maximillian II of Austria, never showed much interests for his Italian possession, and on the other side, he had little room for maneuvering beyond the Alps. In 1569 Dornberg was instructed to oppose the Pope's decision to elevate Tuscany, then ruled by the House of Medici to the status of a Grand Duchy. Although he did everything it was in his hands Impartial prerogatives were not kept in consideration and Pius V in August 1569 declared Cosimo Grand Duke of Tuscany, a title unprecedented in Italy. Even his mission in Genoa failed. the city was on the verge of a civil war due to the sectarian feud between an old and a new noble family. The quarrel was settled without Vito's intervention, most likely due to the action of the Pope Gregory XIII envoy. In 1576 Rudolf II succeeded to his father Maximilian II, and at least at first, he began showing a more interest for his Italian possessions, although most of his efforts were aimed at the containment of the Spanish Habsburg influence in Italy. He particularly tried to preserve the independence of the little Italian Seigneuries, especially the one in Novellara, in the present day Italian Region Emilia Region, who was under the threat of being annexed by the Papal States. For a similar situation, Vito of Dornberg was dispatched to Finale Ligure a marquisate west of Genoa, ruled by the del Carreto family, which was struggling with the Spanish to investigate. The town had a German garrison and a Gorizian Commissar, Pietro of Strassoldo accused of being unfaithful and too supportive of the Spanish. It took Vito almost a year to have a clear picture of the whole situation, and when he eventually left for Venice, to resume his ambassador duties, he left behind to attend the fief the Bongiovanni brothers, his wife relatives. The regency did not met the population favor anyway. The Bongiovanni's administration was later subject of an investigation for embezzlement, after a popular uprising, had forced them to flee.

== Ambassador to Rome ==
The office of the Austrian Ambassador in Rome had become vacant with the death of Prospero d’Arco, in 1572. On 31 May 1587 Vito's nephew Baldasarre, died in Prague. In order to help the nephew to become a diplomat, Vito had accepted the office of ambassador in Rome, making therefore Baldassare eligible to replace him in his Venice seat. However, when his nephew died, Vito had to review his plan and let the Court know that he would not be able to go to Rome, as the office was too onerous for his personal finances. Many prominent people urged Vito to take up the office in Rome, including his brother Maximilian, who was the Imperial court great Seneschal and the Papal Nuncio in Venice, both hoping that his diplomatic skills would have helped to reestablish good relations between the pope and the Emperor. In October, Vito paid a visit the Court in Prague, and when asked again to become ambassador to Rome, he declared that he would have done it, if the government would pay him the sum of 43,000 Florins, the total amount of money he had anticipated. This was a sum was too high for the Imperial Court. In the end he was eventually appointed ambassador in Rome on 3 September 1589 by Emperor Rudolf II. Vito's new assignment was not easy. There were many areas of dispute between the Emperor and the Pope; starting with the Polish succession, where Pope Sixtus V had switched his initial support from Maximillian of Austria to Sigismund of Sweden, to the King of France, Henry of Navarre, a Protestant who had converted to Catholicism, joining the Catholic League. Vito did not feel happy in Rome; he didn’t like the climate, and then find out the finance of the legations were in a complete mess, due to the bad management of the previous administrators. Most of his job was dealing with the continuous request for Ecclesiastic benefit forwarded by the king and his court. The position of Ambassador in Rome was, in part subordinate to the Bishop of Trento, Ludovico Madruzzo, a man of experience, but with a scarce devotion to his office. In addition the Austria policy was close to Spain, and Vito had therefore to coordinate his actions with Philip II’s ambassador in Rome. When on 27 August 1590 Pope Sixtus V died and the newly-elected Pope Urban VII died a month later his election on 27 September 1590, Vito finally felt the pressure of his office, and in a letter to Hans Cobenzl, also a native of Gorizia, at the time Head the Aulic Council, expressed his will to be relieved from the Rome embassy, and to come back to Gorizia.

== Death ==
The Archduke Charles died in July 1590; in January 1591, Vito’s brother Maximilian passed away in Prague. As he learned of these two losses he made the comment, “We must take what God wants”. On 20 March 1591 Vito fell sick three days later, he signed his last official correspondence. By 31 March 1591 his health had degenerated and his secretary sent a message to Prague, announcing that there was no hope left. On 1 April 1591 Vito added a note to his last will, where he renewed the request to be buried in Gorizia inside the St John church. He died the night of 4-5 April and was buried in the church he had built.

== Legacy ==
In 1585 Vito of Dornberg donated a portion of land to build a Church in Gorizia, covering all expenses, dedicated to St. John Baptist (Italian San Giovanni Battista, Slovenian Sveti Ivana); the church was completed and consecrated in 1590, although services were held even before. The Church that still exists, sited in what is now the San Giovanni Street, beside the house of another prominent Gorician, Graziadio Isaia Ascoli (16 July 1829 – 21 January 1907), and it is known as the religious parish of the Slovenian community of Gorizia. The reasons for the building were not clear, and probably were due to a moment of extreme devotion as Vito always was a devote Catholic throughout his life. In his last years, he became even more and more involved in religious brotherhood, but he kept a firm stance on the separation between state and religion. He wrote his memoires to give his nephews, his marriage was childless, a guidance to follow in the public administration. Throughout is life he always held two things above the others; the honor of his family, and the loyalty to his sovereign. By 1589 Vito of Dornberg was in charge of a huge family, having fourteen descendants including nephews and grandnephews, most of them holding public office, and good positions in the state administration. Having achieved this result he saw the opportunity for his family to compete with the most powerful and wealthiest families of Gorizia County and the Duchy of Carinthia. However just three generations after the death of the old ambassador, the only surviving male descendant of Vito's nephew, Gaspare Vito of Dornberg, had two daughters: Beatrice and Eleonora. Towards the second half of the 1600s, Eleonora married Marzio di Strassoldo bringing the Dornberg dowry of property, title and right, into her husband's family. Thus ended the Vito of Dornberg direct male-line descendants.
