= Dornberger =

Dornberger (Dørnberger is a Norwegian spelling) is a German & Jewish (Ashkenazic) surname most likely derived from a place called "Dornberg". Notable people with the surname include:

- Carl Dørnberger (1864–1940), Norwegian artist
- Walter Dornberger (1895–1980), German Army artillery officer
