= Diocese of Koper =

Latin Catholic jurisdiction in Slovenia

Coordinates: 45°32′51.52″N 13°43′50.17″E

Diocese of Koper Dioecesis Iustinopolitana Škofija Koper

Catholic
- Assumption Cathedral, Koper

- Coat of arms

Location
- Country: Slovenia
- Ecclesiastical province: Ljubljana

Statistics
- Area: 4,386 km^{2} (1,693 sq mi)
- Population: Total; Catholics: (as of 2013); 266,403; 181,230 (68%)
- Parishes: 100

Information
- Denomination: Catholic Church
- Sui iuris church: Latin Church
- Rite: Roman Rite
- Cathedral: Cathedral of Mary's Assumption, Koper (Slovene: Stolna cerkev Marijinega vnebovzetja)
- Co-cathedral: Co-Cathedral of Christ the Saviour, Nova Gorica (Konkatedrala Kristusa Odrešenika)

Current leadership
- Pope: Leo XIV
- Bishop: Jurij Bizjak
- Metropolitan Archbishop: Stane Zore

Website
- Website of the Diocese

The Diocese of Koper (Latin: Dioecesis Iustinopolitana; Slovene: Škofija Koper; Italian: Diocesi di Capodistria) is a Latin Church diocese of the Catholic Church in southwestern Slovenia. It is part of the ecclesiastical province of Ljubljana. Its cathedral is dedicated to the Assumption of Mary and is located in the Adriatic port town of Koper. A co-cathedral, the Co-Cathedral of Christ the Saviour, located in Nova Gorica, gained its status in 2004. The Latin name of the diocese, Dioecesis Iustinopolitana, is because Koper was in the past named Justinopolis in honour of the Byzantine emperor Justinian II.

== History ==
- 530: founded as Diocese of Capodistria, united to the Diocese of Trieste between 1828 and 1977
- 1947-1977: Apostolic administration for the diocesan parishes of the towns, including Capodistria, outside the Italian territory after World War II (in "Zone B" of the Free Territory of Trieste or directly in Yugoslavia)
- October 17, 1977: Established as Diocese of Koper from the slovenian parts of the Archdiocese of Gorizia and the Diocese of Trieste–Koper, Italy, few days after the formal Yugoslav incorporation of Capodistria/Koper (when the 1975 Osimo Treaty took effect)

== Special churches ==
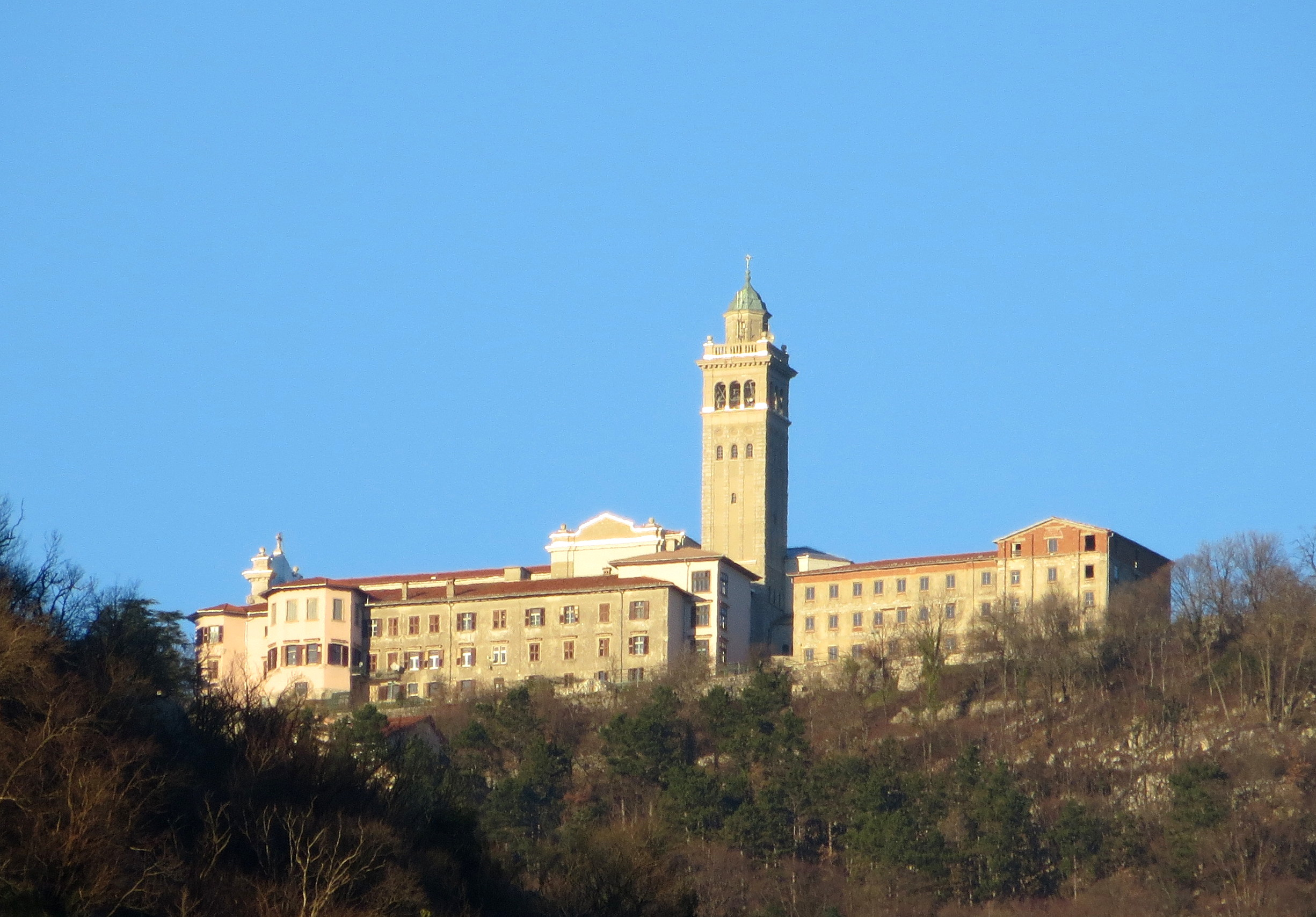
Sveta Gora Monastery

Cathedrals

  - Cathedral of the Assumption of the Blessed Virgin Mary, Koper
  - Co-Cathedral of Christ the Saviour, Nova Gorica

Minor Basilicas

  - Romarska cerkev (bazilika) Marijinega vnebovzetja, Solkan (Sveta Gora)

== Leadership ==
Bishops of Koper (Roman rite)

  - 1 Janez Jenko (17 October 1977 – 15 April 1987)
    - Metod Pirih, coadjutor bishop (25 March 1985 – 16 April 1987)
  - 2 Metod Pirih (16 April 1987 – 26 May 2012)
    - Jurij Bizjak, auxiliary, titular bishop of Gergis (13 May 2000 – 26 May 2012)
  - 3 Jurij Bizjak (since 26 May 2012)

== See also ==
- Catholic Church in Slovenia
