= Assumption Cathedral, Koper =

Coordinates: 45.5482°N 13.7301°E

Cathedral of the Assumption of the Blessed Virgin Mary
- Stolna cerkev Marijinega vnebovzetja
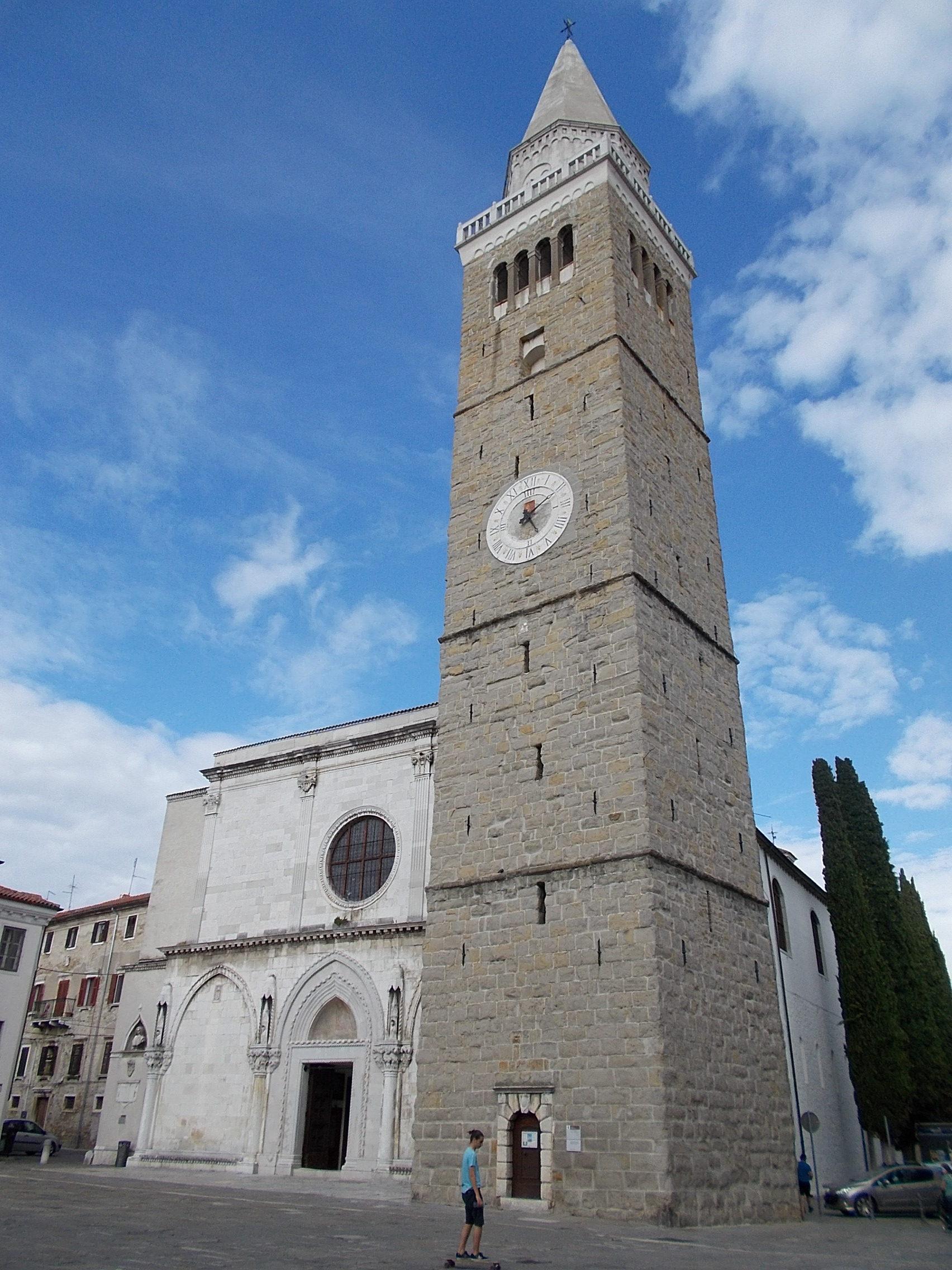
- Cathedral of the Assumption of the Blessed Virgin Mary
- Location: Koper
- Country: Slovenia
- Denomination: Roman Catholic Church
- Website: https://zupnija-kp-stolnica.rkc.si/

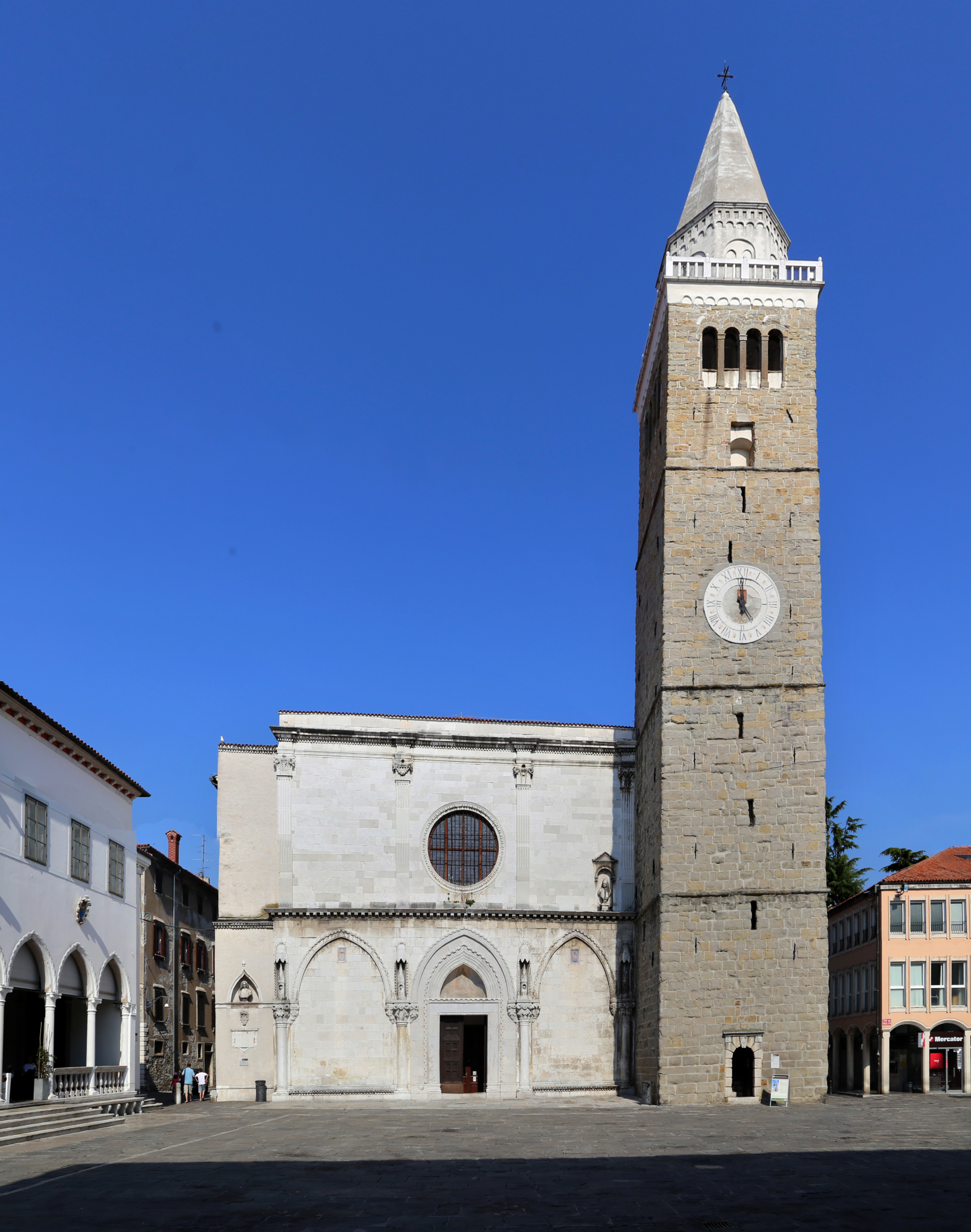
Another View

The Cathedral of the Assumption of the Blessed Virgin Mary (Slovene: Stolna cerkev Marijinega vnebovzetja) also called Koper Cathedral is the Catholic cathedral of the Diocese of Koper, in the city of Koper, Slovenia.

The church was built in the second half of the twelfth century in Romanesque style, with three naves, each ending with an apse. Until 1392 the church underwent changes and additions, which also led to a change of style: the western facade is clearly Gothic. After an earthquake in 1460, the facade was redesigned in 1488, with the addition of Renaissance elements. The tower, which offers views of the city and the bay, is four stories, follows the style of an Italian bell tower and houses one of the oldest bells in Slovenia, dating back to 1333. Early 18th century, Koper was under Venetian influence, and was again an architectural transformation in the Baroque style. Under the direction of Giorgio Massari, additional landscaping elements were added to the church, including valuable paintings of Venetian painters Pietro Liberi, Celesti Andrea, Antonio Zanchi and Vittore Carpaccio. The most important painting is the Holy Conversation of Vittore Carpaccio, dating from 1516. The organs in the church are the biggest church organs in Slovenia.

== See also ==
- Roman Catholicism in Slovenia
