= Lazna =

- Location in Slovenia
- Coordinates: 46°2′19.85″N 13°48′18.14″E
- Country: Slovenia
- Traditional region: Slovenian Littoral
- Statistical region: Gorizia
- Municipality: Nova Gorica

Area
  - Total: 11.34 km^{2} (4.38 sq mi)
- Elevation: 950.9 m (3,120 ft)

Population (2002)
  - Total: 3

Lazna (pronounced [ˈlaːzna]) is a small dispersed settlement in western Slovenia in the Municipality of Nova Gorica. It is located on the Trnovo Forest Plateau above the Vipava Valley and is only accessible by road from the village of Lokve.
