= Ravnica, Nova Gorica =

Ravnica
- Location in Slovenia
- Coordinates: 45°58′53.18″N 13°41′50.9″E
- Country: Slovenia
- Traditional region: Slovenian Littoral
- Statistical region: Gorizia
- Municipality: Nova Gorica

Area
  - Total: 7.3 km^{2} (2.8 sq mi)
- Elevation: 423 m (1,388 ft)

Population (2025)
  - Total: 232

Ravnica (pronounced [ɾau̯ˈniːtsa]; Italian: Raunizza) is a village in western Slovenia in the Municipality of Nova Gorica. It is located on the high Trnovo Forest Plateau (Slovene: Trnovski gozd), overlooking the villages of Grgar and Čepovan.

The parish church in the settlement is dedicated to Saints Hermagoras and Fortunatus and belongs to the Diocese of Koper.
