= Banjšice dialect =

Dialect of Slovene

The Banjšice subdialect (banjški govor, banjiški govor, banjško podnarečje) is a Slovene subdialect of the Karst dialect in the Littoral dialect group. It is spoken on the Banjšice Plateau and in the Soča Valley, and it includes the settlements of Ročinj, Kanal, and Banjšice.

== Phonological and morphological characteristics ==
The Banjšice subdialect has not been extensively studied. It features fronting of secondarily accented short vowels before palatal syllables.
