= Podgozd, Nova Gorica =

Podgozd
- Location in Slovenia
- Coordinates: 45°59′38.98″N 13°43′0″E
- Country: Slovenia
- Traditional region: Slovenian Littoral
- Statistical region: Gorizia
- Municipality: Nova Gorica

Area
  - Total: 1.69 km^{2} (0.65 sq mi)
- Elevation: 706.8 m (2,319 ft)

Population (2002)
  - Total: 44

Podgozd (pronounced [pɔdˈɡɔst]) is a small settlement northwest of Trnovo in the Municipality of Nova Gorica in western Slovenia.

== History ==
Podgozd was established as a separate settlement in 1997, when it was split off from Ravnica.
