= Lokovec =

- Location in Slovenia
- Coordinates: 46°02′48″N 13°46′05″E
- Country: Slovenia
- Traditional region: Slovenian Littoral
- Statistical region: Gorizia
- Municipality: Nova Gorica

Area
  - Total: 19.88 km^{2} (7.68 sq mi)
- Elevation: 913.1 m (2,996 ft)

Population (2002)
  - Total: 294

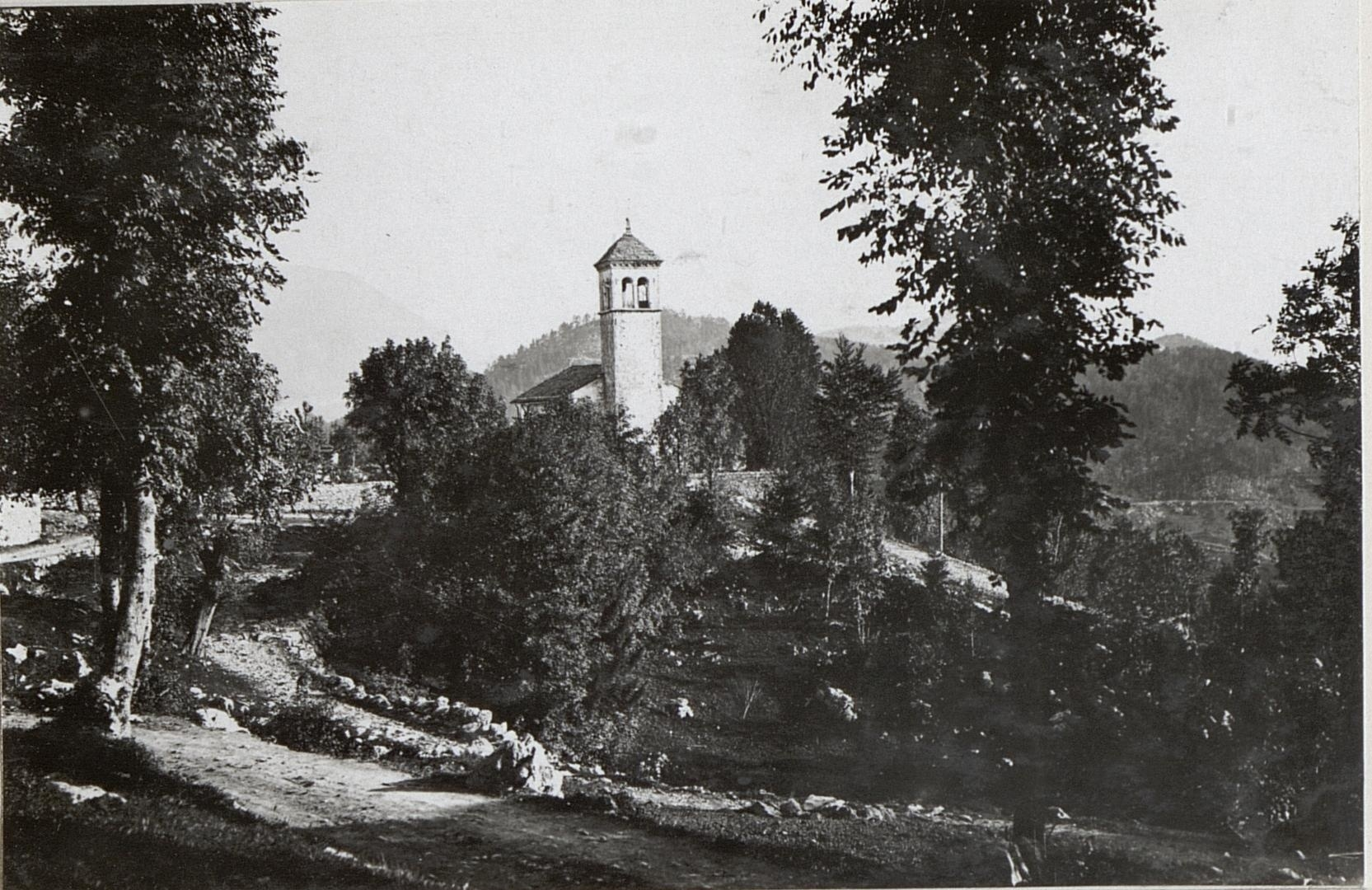
c. 1914–1918

Lokovec (pronounced [lɔˈkɔːʋəts]) is a dispersed settlement in western Slovenia in the City Municipality of Nova Gorica. It is located on the Banjšice Plateau overlooking the narrow Čepovan Valley, which divides it from the Trnovo Forest Plateau (Slovene: Trnovski gozd) on the other side of the valley. It is part of the Gorizia region.

The parish church in the settlement is dedicated to Saints Peter and Paul and belongs to the Diocese of Koper.
