= Nemci, Nova Gorica =

Nemci
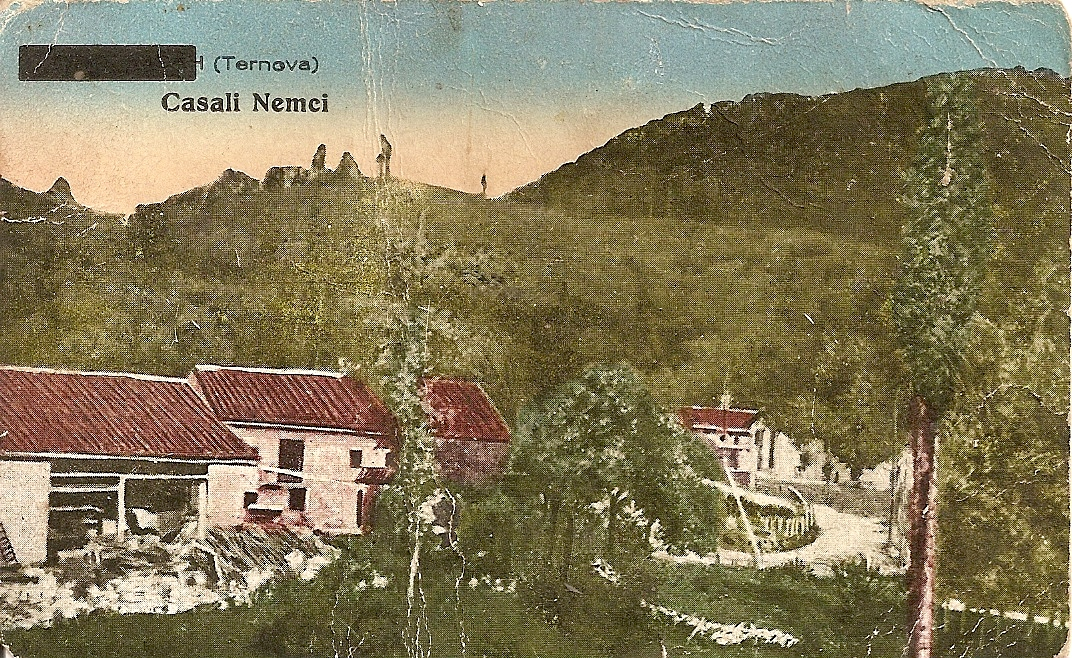
- 1935 postcard of Nemci

- Location in Slovenia
- Coordinates: 45°59′25.58″N 13°46′15.49″E
- Country: Slovenia
- Traditional region: Slovenian Littoral
- Statistical region: Gorizia
- Municipality: Nova Gorica

Area
  - Total: 1.52 km^{2} (0.59 sq mi)
- Elevation: 847.2 m (2,780 ft)

Population (2002)
  - Total: 29

Nemci (pronounced [ˈneːmtsi]; Italian: Casali Nenzi) is a small village in western Slovenia in the Municipality of Nova Gorica. It is located on the high Trnovo Forest Plateau overlooking the Vipava Valley.
