= Krista Povirk =

Slovenian Catholic catechist (1938–2004)

- Born: Kristina Povirk; 1938; Križevska Vas, Kingdom of Yugoslavia (modern-day Slovenia)
- Died: 31 January 2004 (aged 65–66); Novo Mesto, Slovenia
- Burial place: Žale
- Occupations: catechist, poet, choir director

Kristina Povirk, also known as Krista Povirk, sister Krista, (1938 – 31 January 2004) was a Slovenian catechist, poet, and choir director. In the 1960s she completed a Catechetical Course and later the Theological Pastoral School, and in 1966 she began work in the Koper city parish as the first fully employed lay catechist in the Slovene lands. She also wrote poetry. After retirement she served as a choir leader.

== Childhood ==
She was born in 1938 into a Slovenian family in Križevska vas, then known as Sveti Križ pri Moravčah (Saint Cross near Moravče). Because she was the tenth child in the family, her godfather at baptism was the Slovenian representative in the then Yugoslav government, Anton Korošec. Her family was devout and active in the parish. One of her younger brothers later became a priest.

As a child she enjoyed singing and reading. She wanted to become a teacher. She later said that she "gathered knowledge and education like a bee - as was accessible at the time to a child from a believing family active in the Church." (At that time Slovene lands were part of Socialist Federal Republic of Yugoslavia.) Already as a child she took an active part in cultural life in her home village and in the Church. She completed primary school with the best results in the entire school. Because she came from a devout Catholic family, to her great disappointment, she was not admitted to teacher-training college, despite excellent grades. Later she received an opportunity to continue her education, and in 1956 became a member of the editorial board of a high-school-student periodical.

== Work ==
=== Educational and pastoral work ===
In the first half of the 1960s she completed a Catechetical Course. At the end of the Second Vatican Council she applied for full-time employment in Church pastoral work. In 1966 she obtained a post as a catechist in the Koper city parish, which she held until 1969. She was the first fully employed lay catechist in Slovene lands. In 1969 she entered the Order of Saint Ursula. In January 1972, in Varaždin, she made her first vows and soon after returned to her homeland.

For the next fifteen years she served as a catechist in the Ljubljana–Šiška parish and the Brezovica pri Ljubljani parish. In addition to catechetical work, she also prepared spiritual retreats for young people. In January 1977 she made her perpetual vows in Ljubljana. She also completed the four-year Theological Pastoral School.

In 1988 she moved to the Ursuline community in Nova Gorica and, until retirement, worked as a catechist in surrounding places. She taught the greatest number of religious-education classes in the parish of Solkan, to which she became deeply attached. She was a great devotee of the Our Lady, Queen of Sveta Gora and enjoyed making pilgrimages on foot to nearby Sveta Gora (Holy Mountain). She drew strong inspiration from the life of Mary's visionary and shepherdess Urška Ferligoj, and sometimes signed herself as Urška Krista.

=== Literary work ===
She began writing poetry in her youth, but devoted herself to it more intensely during her years in the Goriška region. She constantly revised her poems and refined them. Her poetry is primarily personal and confessional. She wrote many poems that she used in pastoral work. Several of her poems speak about the founder of the Ursulines, Saint Angela Merici. An important theme in her poetry was Sveta Gora .

She published poems in Solkanski časopis (Solkan Newspaper), in the Solkan parish newsletter Eno srce (One Heart), and in Svetogorska Kraljica (Queen of Sveta Gora). Her first published poem, titled Skalniške zvezde (Mountain Stars), first appeared in Eno srce in December 1988, then in the collection Na Sveti Gori zvon zvoni (“On Sveta Gora the Bell Rings”) in 1992, and again in Svetogorska Kraljica in 1998.

In 2004, part of her poetic oeuvre, together with the poetry of some other Slovenian Ursulines, was published in the book Žuborenje (Babbling Brook), edited by the Slovenian literary historian Marija Stanonik and published by Družina publishing house.

=== Musical work ===
After arriving in Žužemberk in 1994, she took over leadership of three parish choirs: a children's choir, a youth choir, and a mixed church choir. She led them until her death. Under her direction, the children's choir staged biblical stories for holidays and organized recitations. She taught the children songs through play.

When the Association of Peasant Women of Suha krajina was founded in 1995, Krista, together with the association's leader, founded the association choir named Žitni klas (Wheat Ear) and became its choir director. She led the choir until her death. Under her leadership the choir sang church songs, folk songs, and also more recent songs. Together with the association's leader, she wrote down a number of folk songs that were already being lost and taught them to the choir members. Žitni klas performed in the home municipality and in other places in Lower Carniola. At performances, the members and the choir leader wore a uniform consisting of a white blouse, a long black skirt, and a green scarf printed with a yellow ear of wheat.

== Later life and death ==
After retiring in 1993 she lived and worked in the parish of Žužemberk, where her brother served as parish priest. There she focused primarily on musical work. She struggled with severe health problems. She died on 31 January 2004 in the Novo Mesto hospital. She was buried at Žale Cemetery in Ljubljana on 6 January 2005.
