= Dragovica =

- Location in Slovenia
- Coordinates: 46°2′52″N 13°39′51″E
- Country: Slovenia
- Traditional region: Slovenian Littoral
- Statistical region: Goriška
- Municipality: Nova Gorica

Area
  - Total: 3.2 km^{2} (1.2 sq mi)
- Elevation: 603 m (1,978 ft)

Population (2018)
  - Total: 52

Dragovica is a settlement located in the Municipality of Nova Gorica in western Slovenia.

== History ==
Dragovica was a hamlet of Grgarske Ravne until 2004, when it was separated and made a settlement in its own right.
