= Trnovo, Nova Gorica =

Trnovo
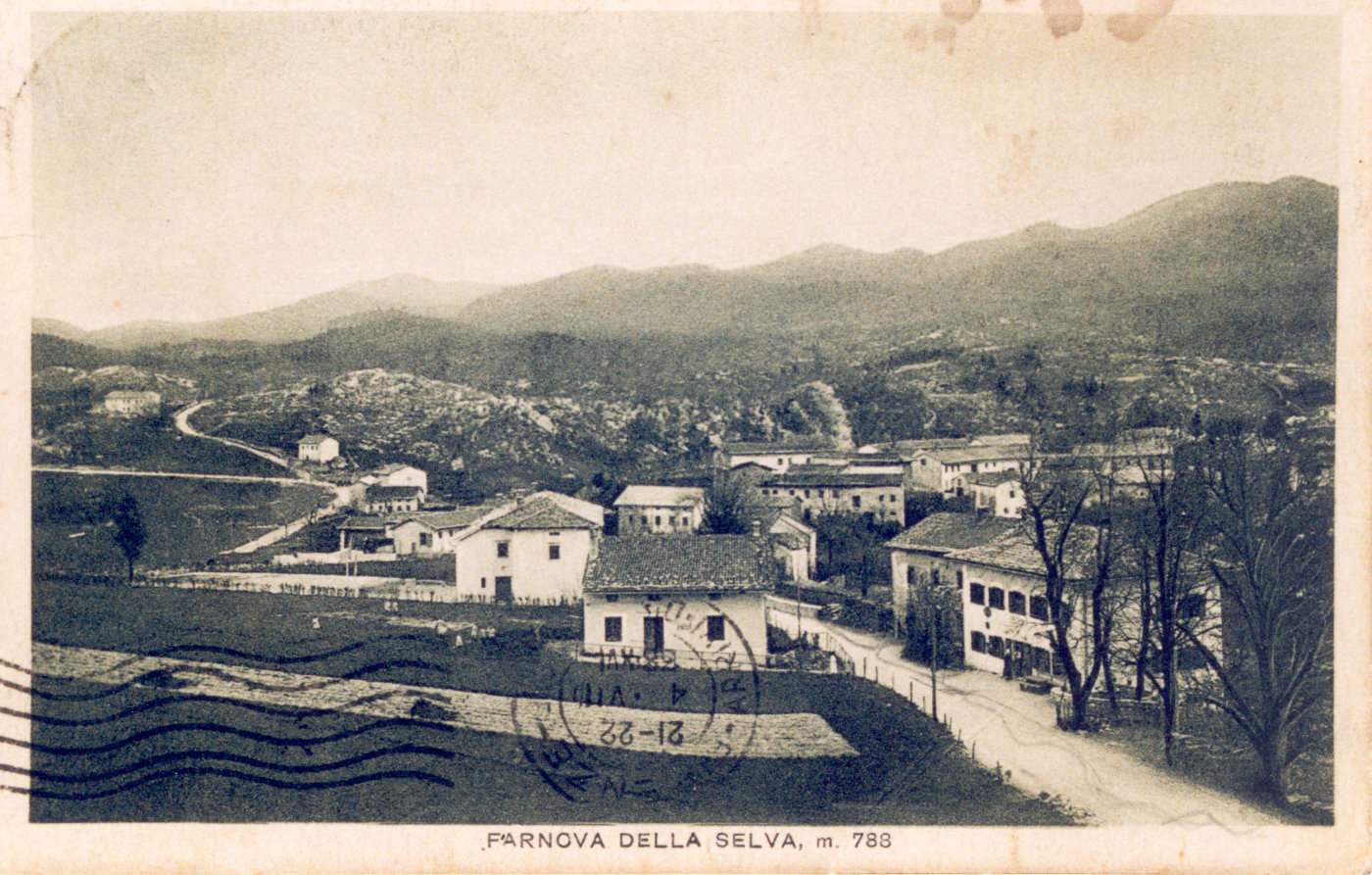
- 1938 postcard of Trnovo

- Location in Slovenia
- Coordinates: 45°58′18.43″N 13°44′37.09″E
- Country: Slovenia
- Traditional region: Slovenian Littoral
- Statistical region: Gorizia
- Municipality: Nova Gorica

Area
  - Total: 15.65 km^{2} (6.04 sq mi)
- Elevation: 780.8 m (2,562 ft)

Population (2002)
  - Total: 305

Trnovo (pronounced [təɾˈnɔːʋɔ] or [təɾˈnoːʋɔ]; Italian: Tarnova della Selva) is a village in western Slovenia in the Municipality of Nova Gorica. It is located on the high Trnovo Forest Plateau (Slovene: Trnovski gozd) in the traditional Slovene Littoral region.

== Name ==
The place name Trnovo (and related names such as Trnovec, Trnovče, Trnovci, and Trnovska vas) is common in Slovenia. The name is derived from the common noun trn 'thorn', referring to a place where thorny brush grows.

== History ==
The village was first mentioned in the 18th century, as a possession of the Counts of Gorizia, seated in Kromberg Castle. The village was known for logging and transportation of timber into Gorizia by teamsters with horse-drawn wagons. Until the First World War, the village was part of Austro-Hungarian Empire. It then came under Italian rule, and it was known as Tarnova della Selva (literally 'Trnovo of the woods'). During the Second World War, it was the site of the Battle of Trnovo between Yugoslav Partisans and Italian troops in January 1945.

=== Mass grave ===
Trnovo is the site of a mass grave from the period immediately after the Second World War. The Zalesnika Shaft Mass Grave (Slovene: Grobišče Brezno Zalesnika), also known as the Wild Apple Shaft Mass Grave (Grobišče Brezno za lesniko), is located 1.5 kilometers (0.93 mi) northeast of the village on the right side of the road to Lokve. It contains the remains of Home Guard and Italian prisoners of war and Slovene civilians murdered in May 1945.

== Church ==
The parish church in the settlement is dedicated to Our Lady of the Snows and belongs to the Diocese of Koper.
