= Sveta Gora =

Sveta Gora Monte Santo (di Gorizia)
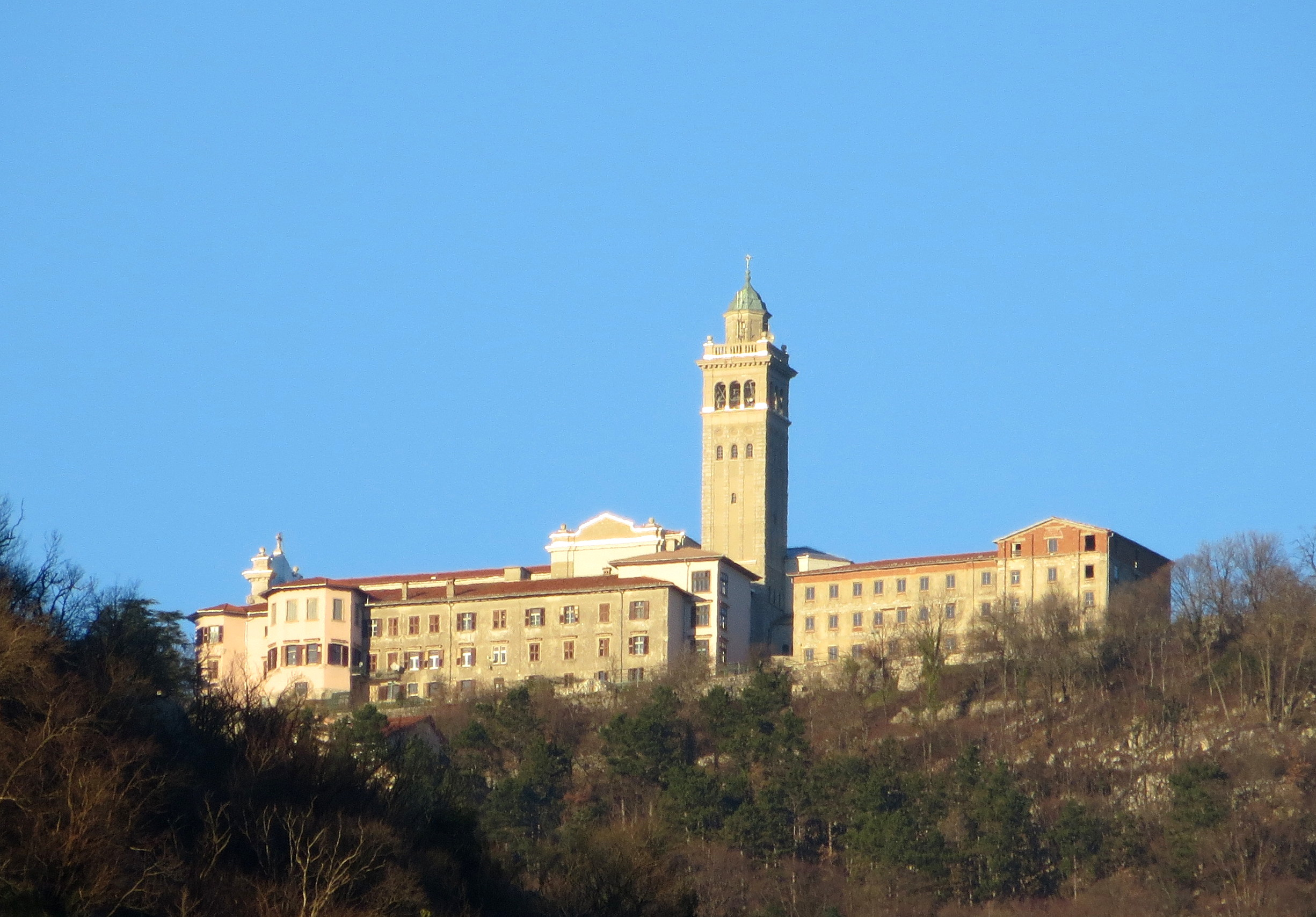

- Location in Slovenia
- Coordinates: 45°59′56.16″N 13°39′19.26″E
- Country: Slovenia
- Traditional region: Slovenian Littoral
- Statistical region: Gorizia
- Municipality: Nova Gorica

Area
  - Total: 0.3 km^{2} (0.12 sq mi)
- Elevation: 681 m (2,234 ft)

Population (2013)
  - Total: 14

Sveta Gora (pronounced [ˈsʋeːta ˈɡɔːɾa]; Italian: Monte Santo di Gorizia) is a settlement in western Slovenia in the Municipality of Nova Gorica. It encompasses Holy Mount (Slovene: Sveta gora), above the Soča Valley and southwest of the Banjšice Plateau.

== History ==
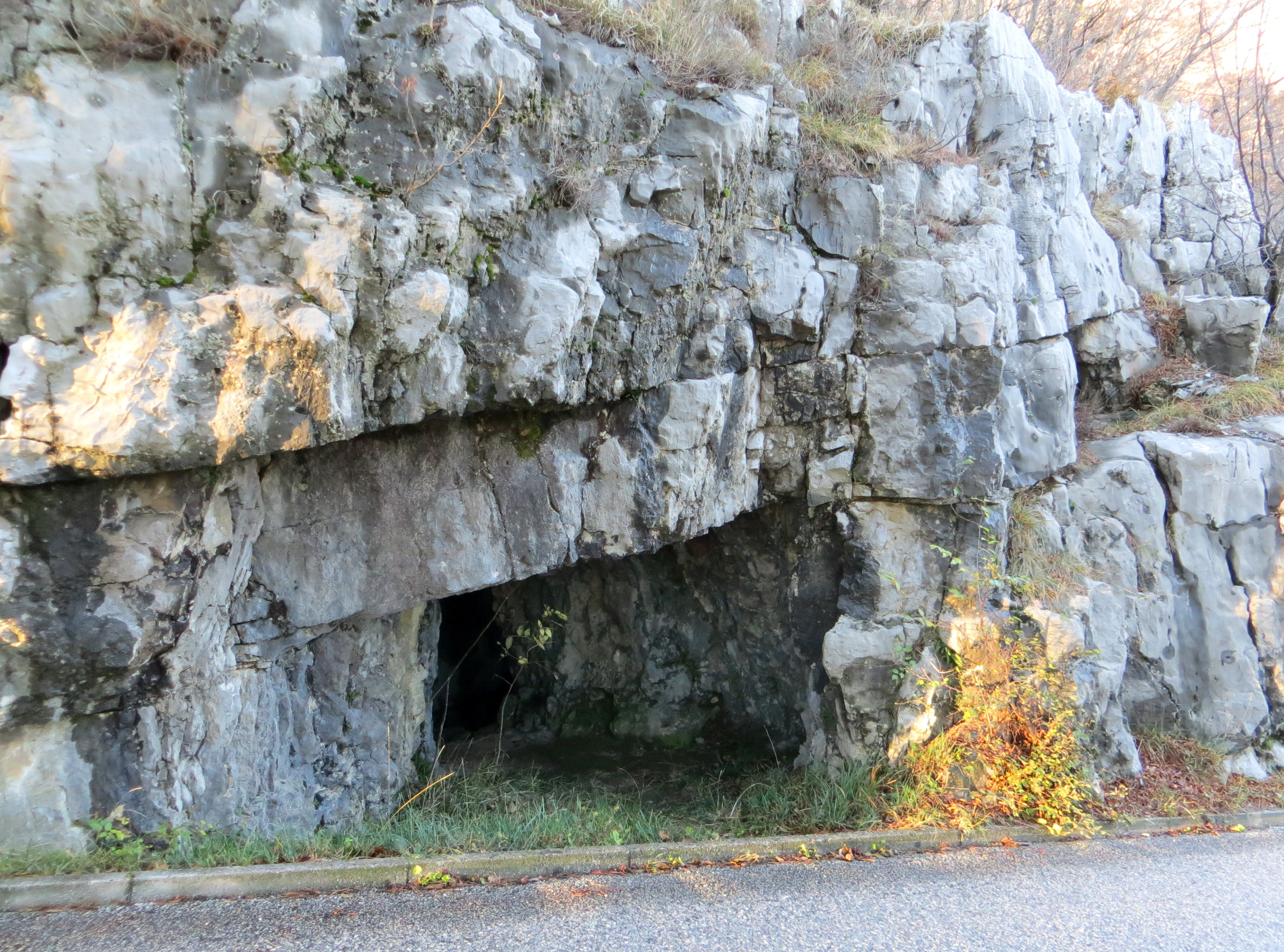
Dugout exterior

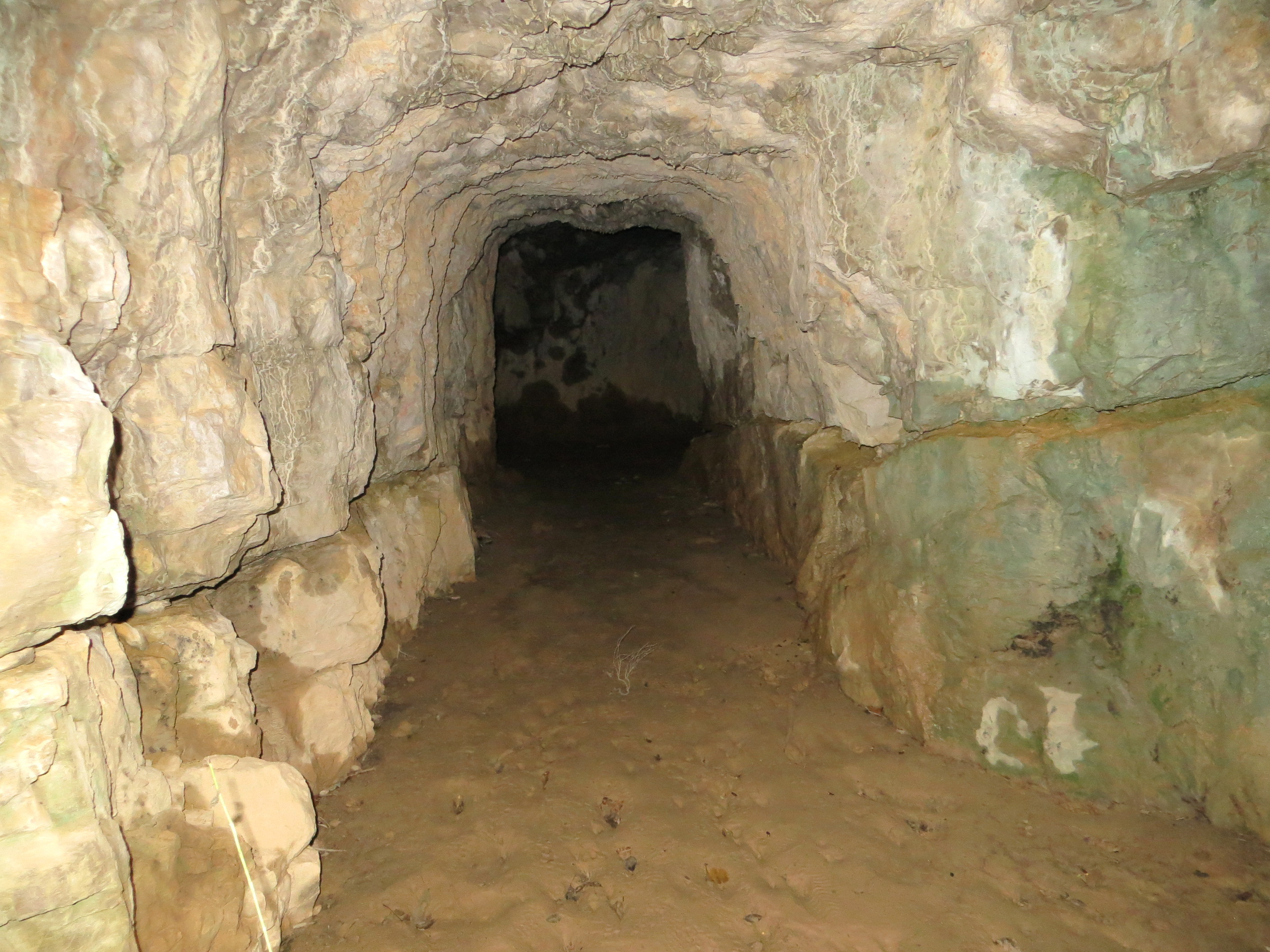
Dugout interior

World War One dugouts

In 1539 Urška Ferligoj, a shepherd from Grgar, had a vision in which the Virgin Mary commanded her to tell the people to build her a church.

In May 1917 Sveta Gora was the scene of heavy fighting between Austrian and Italian forces. Several Austro-Hungarian dugout shelters are found along Skalnica Road (Skalniška cesta) leading to the Franciscan monastery and church at the top of Skalnica Hill (681 meters or 2,234 feet).

Sveta Gora became an independent settlement in 2006, when its territory was administratively separated from the territory of Solkan and Grgar.
