= Vitovlje, Nova Gorica =

Vitovlje
- Location in Slovenia
- Coordinates: 45°55′50.85″N 13°45′48.66″E
- Country: Slovenia
- Traditional region: Slovenian Littoral
- Statistical region: Gorizia
- Municipality: Nova Gorica

Area
  - Total: 11.68 km^{2} (4.51 sq mi)
- Elevation: 245.6 m (806 ft)

Population (2002)
  - Total: 502

Vitovlje (pronounced [ˈʋiːtɔu̯ljɛ]) is a small village above Šempas in the Municipality of Nova Gorica in western Slovenia. It is located in the lower Vipava Valley in the Gorizia region of the Slovene Littoral.

== Churches ==
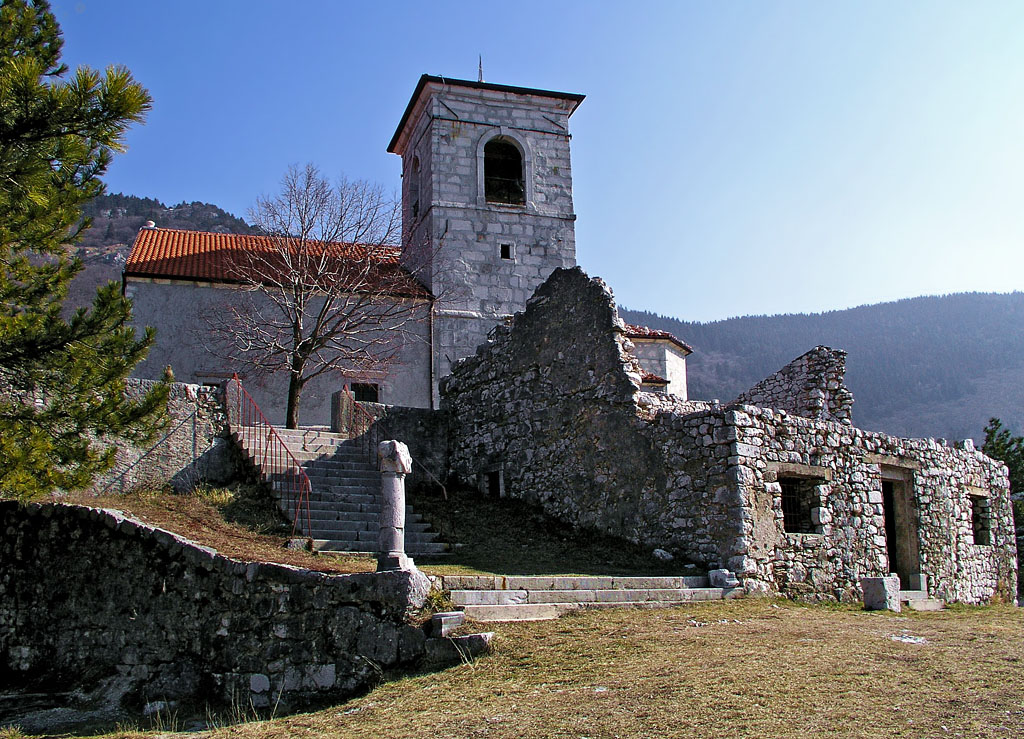
Assumption Church

There are three churches in and around the settlement, all belonging to the Parish of Osek. The church in the valley, at the side of the road turning for the main village, is dedicated to Saint Lucy. The church closest to the core of the settlement is dedicated to Saint Peter, and best known is the pilgrimage church built on a hill above the village, dedicated to the Assumption of Mary.
