= Voglarji =

- Location in Slovenia
- Coordinates: 45°59′22.39″N 13°43′51.5″E
- Country: Slovenia
- Traditional region: Slovenian Littoral
- Statistical region: Gorizia
- Municipality: Nova Gorica

Area
  - Total: 8.58 km^{2} (3.31 sq mi)
- Elevation: 755.9 m (2,480 ft)

Population (2002)
  - Total: 113

Voglarji (pronounced [ˈʋoːɡlaɾji]; Italian: Carbonari) is a dispersed settlement in the Municipality of Nova Gorica in western Slovenia. Voglarji includes the hamlets of Zavrh (Italian: Savergo) and Cvetrež.

== Geography ==
Voglarji is located on the high Trnovo Forest Plateau (Slovene: Trnovski gozd), overlooking the Vipava Valley. The part of the larger plateau known as the Voglarji Plateau (Slovene: Voglarska planota) is named after Voglarji.

== Mass grave ==
Voglarji is the site of a mass grave from the period immediately after the Second World War. The Cvetrež Shaft Mass Grave (Slovene: Grobišče Brezno za Cvetrežem), also known as the Cvetrež 3 Shaft Mass Grave (Grobišče Brezen 3 pri Cvetrežu) is located south of the settlement on the east side of the road to the hamlet of Cvetrež. It contains the remains of Home Guard and Italian prisoners of war, and Slovene and Italian civilians murdered in May 1945.
