= Šmihel, Nova Gorica =

Šmihel Sveti Mihael (until 1955)
- Location in Slovenia
- Coordinates: 45°57′4.17″N 13°43′31.43″E
- Country: Slovenia
- Traditional region: Slovenian Littoral
- Statistical region: Gorizia
- Municipality: Nova Gorica

Area
  - Total: 5.22 km^{2} (2.02 sq mi)
- Elevation: 184.6 m (606 ft)

Population (2002)
  - Total: 266

Šmihel (pronounced [ˈʃmiːxɛu̯]; Italian: San Michele) is a dispersed settlement in the Municipality of Nova Gorica in western Slovenia. It is located in the lower Vipava Valley.

== Name ==
The name of the settlement was changed from Sveti Mihael (literally, 'Archangel Michael') to Šmihel in 1955. The name was changed on the basis of the 1948 Law on Names of Settlements and Designations of Squares, Streets, and Buildings as part of efforts by Slovenia's postwar communist government to remove religious elements from toponyms.

== Church ==
The small church, from which the settlement gets its name, is dedicated to Saint Michael and the belongs to the Parish of Šempas.
