= Urška Ferligoj =

Slovenian shepherdess and Marian seeress (1526–1544)

- Born: Urška; 1526; Grgar
- Died: 1544 (aged 17–18); Grgar
- Occupation: shepherd
- Known for: Marian apparitions on Sveta Gora (1539)

Urška Ferligoj, also known as Shepherdess Urška, was a Slovenian shepherdess and Marian seeress, born in 1526, Grgar, Slovenia and died in 1544, Grgar, Slovenia.

== Childhood ==
The exact date of Urška's birth is unknown because the parish archive in Solkan, where these records were kept, burned down in 1600, and the documents preserved by the Franciscans on Sveta Gora were lost. According to oral tradition, Urška was born in 1526 in Grgar in a house known as "Pri Piskovih" (At the Pottery). Her mother and father were serf farmers. As a young girl, she began working as a shepherdess. She often grazed sheep on Skalnica, where once stood a church that had been destroyed by the Turks in 1496.

== Marian apparition ==
One Saturday in June, after Pentecost in the year 1539, while Urška was herding sheep on Skalnica, the Virgin Mary, holding the Infant Jesus in her arms, appeared to her. The Mother of God spoke to her in Slovene, saying: "Tell the people to build me a house here and to ask me for grace." Urška spread this message to nearby villages and to Gorizia, which brought great joy to the people. Many came in large numbers to the site of the apparition, where they built a temporary chapel and prayed before a statue of Mary, which was crafted based on Urška's description by brothers Francesco and Pietro Floreani from Udine.

== Imprisonment ==
The authorities initially forbade her activities and imprisoned her three times, but The Virgin Mary miraculously freed her each time. Oral tradition holds that she was confined in the underground dungeons of Solkan Castle – the Palač manor. After her third release, she was found in deep prayer at the top of Skalnica, which led the authorities to recognize divine intervention and allowed her to proclaim the “heavenly message and apparitions.” On 11 December 1540, the deputy governor of Gorizia, Hieronim Attems, donated building land on Skalnica for a future church of Virgin Mary. People came on pilgrimage to the apparition site from faraway lands, marveling at the accounts of miraculous events. As a result, Skalnica became known as the Sveta Gora (Holy Mountain).

== Construction and consecration of the church ==
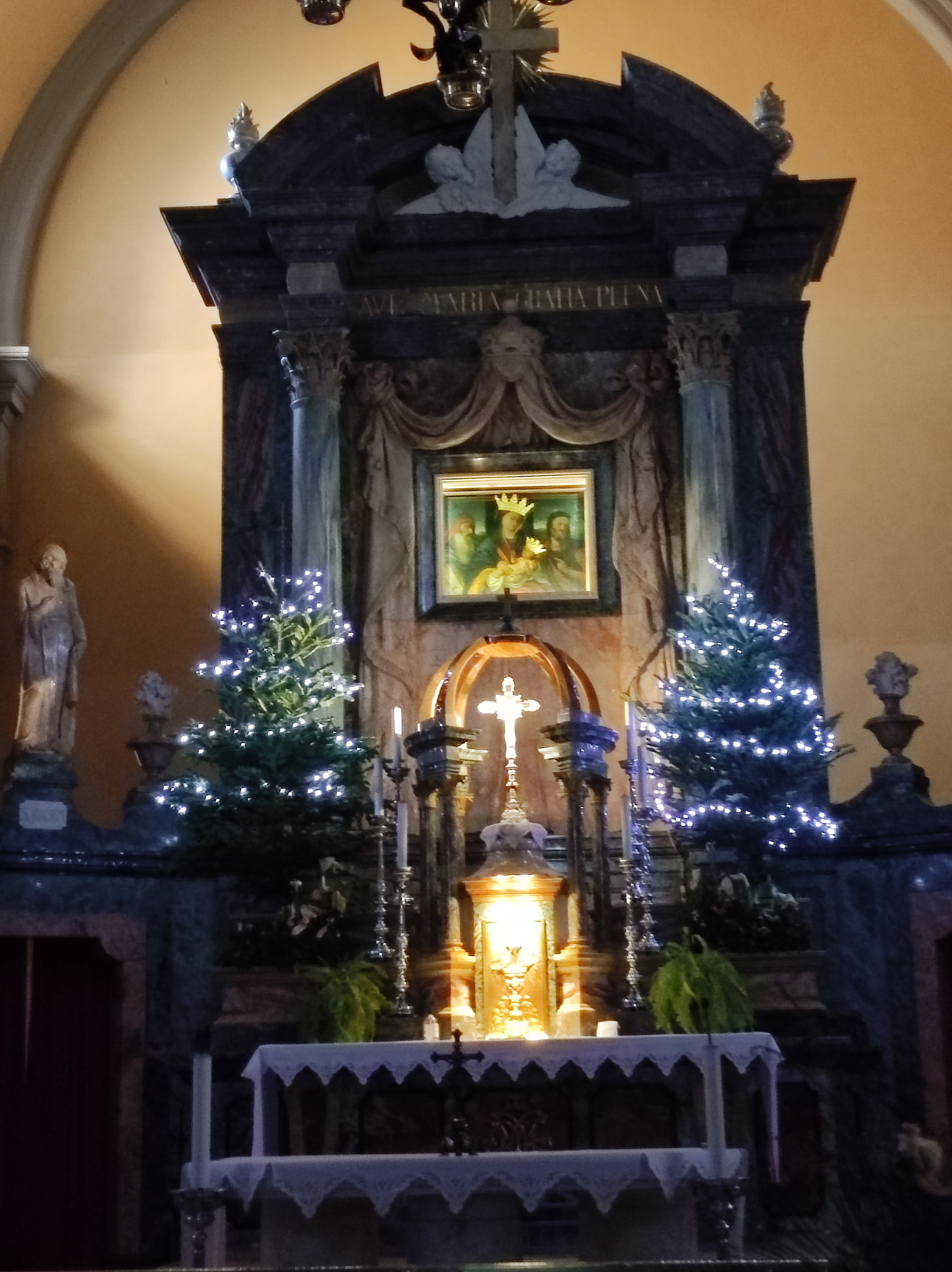
The main altar of Sveta gora basilica

Public enthusiasm for the Sveta Gora was so great that despite difficult conditions, a magnificent sanctuary was built atop the mountain within three years (1541–1544). Patriarch Marco Grimani donated an image of the Mother of God with the Infant Jesus, the prophet Isaiah, and Saint John the Baptist, a work by the painter Jacopo Negretti. On 12th of October, 1544, the church was consecrated by the Patriarch’s vicar general, Bishop Egidio Falcetta. Urška also attended the consecration, though she had become very weak due to the effects of her imprisonment.

== Death ==
Shortly after the consecration of the Sveta Gora church, Urška fell gravely ill. According to tradition, each evening a fog would descend from the church to her house, and the Mother of God would visit her. Urška died that same year. At the moment of her death, two Franciscan friars were praying in the church on the Holy Mountain. They have seen Urška, dressed in white, walking toward the altar, where the Virgin Mary stood holding the infant Jesus. When Urška reached the altar, the Virgin placed a white wreath on her head. It is believed that Shepherdess Urška is buried near the Church of St. Martin in Grgar, where a memorial gravestone with a mosaic of the apparition scene now stands.

== Three main historical sources ==
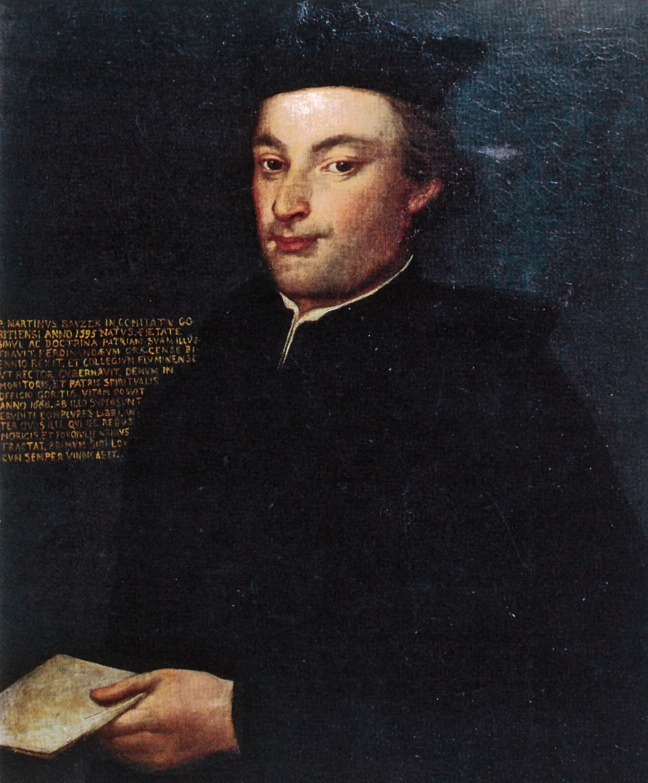
Martin Bauzer

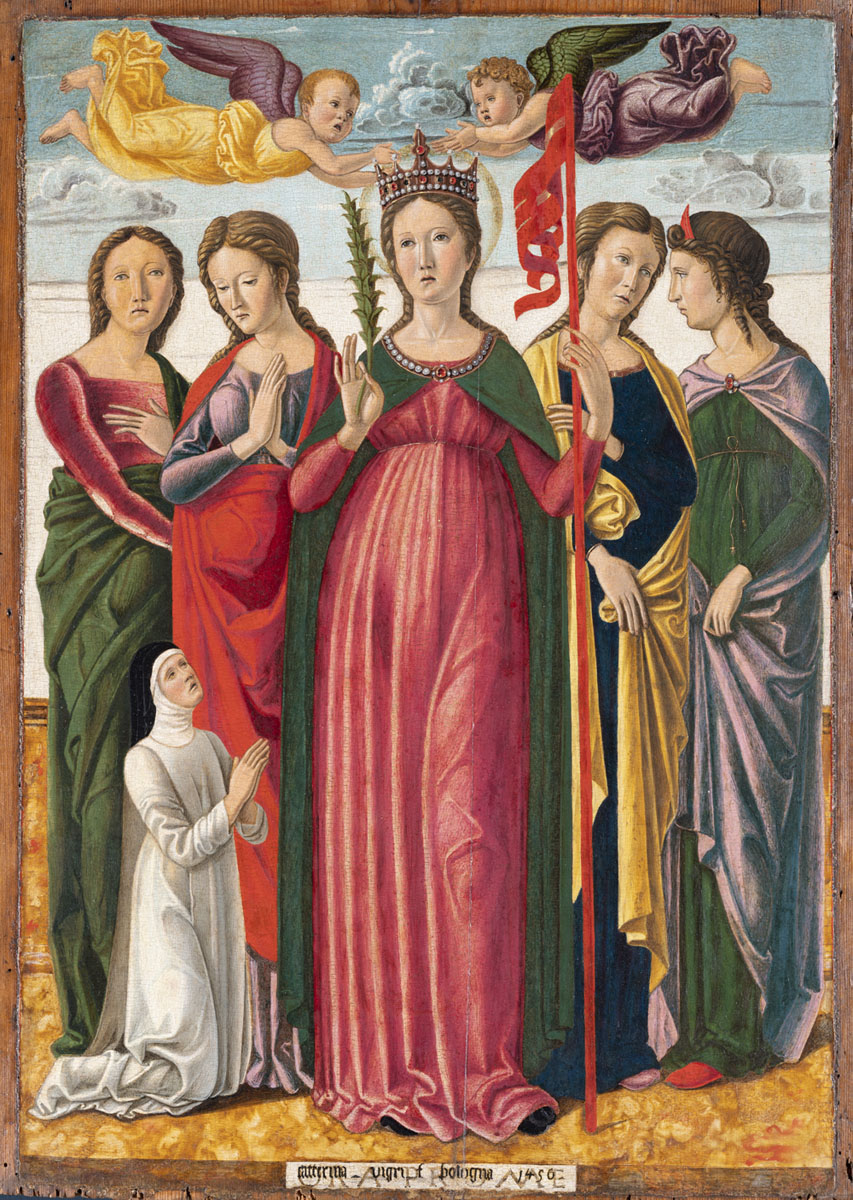
Saint Ursula and Four Holy Virgins by Catherine of Bologna (c.1450)

In addition to strong oral tradition, the three main historical sources on Shepherdess Urška are the writings of three historians: Franjo Glavinić (1648), Martin Bauzer (1657), and Gian Giacomo D'Ischia (1684). All three mention her by name: "The devout shepherdess named Ursula from Grgar" (Franjo Glavinić), "The woman Ursula" (Martin Bauzer), "Ursula Ferligojnica, a poor shepherdess" (Gian Giacomo D'Ischia). (Her name Urška is one of Slovenian versions of name Ursula. Urška's patron saint was Saint Ursula.) Martin Bauzer derived his information from documents on the Sveta Gora dating from 1630 to 1640. Franjo Glavinić was the Franciscan guardian on the Sveta Gora from 1639 to 1642 during the celebration of the first centenary of the apparitions. As a researcher and historian, he likely personally heard living witnesses of the events, having served earlier (1610–1613, 1616–1619, and 1619–1622) as provincial of the Franciscan province of Bosnia and Croatia, which included the Sveta Gora.

== In literature ==
Shepherdess Urška has inspired many literary works. In 1938, Joža Lovrenčič wrote Legend of Mary and the Shepherdess Urška (Legenda o Mariji in pastirici Uršiki). In 1939, during the opening of a chapel dedicated to Urška Ferligoj in Grgar, a play titled Na Skalnici (On Skalnica) by Dragotin Vodopivec was performed for the first time. In 1951, Ivo Česnik wrote a story of the apparition titled The Song of the Holy Mountain (Svetogorska pesem). In 1979, writer Zora Piščanc published a novel titled Shepherdess Urška (Pastirica Urška), narrating Urška’s childhood, the apparition, her imprisonment, and the construction of the Sveta Gora church. It is based on historical records and oral tradition. In 1994, writer Berta Golob and illustrator Silva Karim published a coloring book titled Shepherdess Urška (Pastirica Urška). In 2006, writer Andraž Arko and illustrator Urša Skoberne published a picture book titled Shepherdess Urška and the Queen of the Holy Mountain (Pastirica Urška in Svetogorska Kraljica). Slovenian catechist, poet, and choir director Krista Povirk, first fully employed lay catechist in the Slovene lands, drew strong inspiration from Urška Ferligoj's life, and sometimes even signed herself as Urška Krista.

== Urška’s trail ==
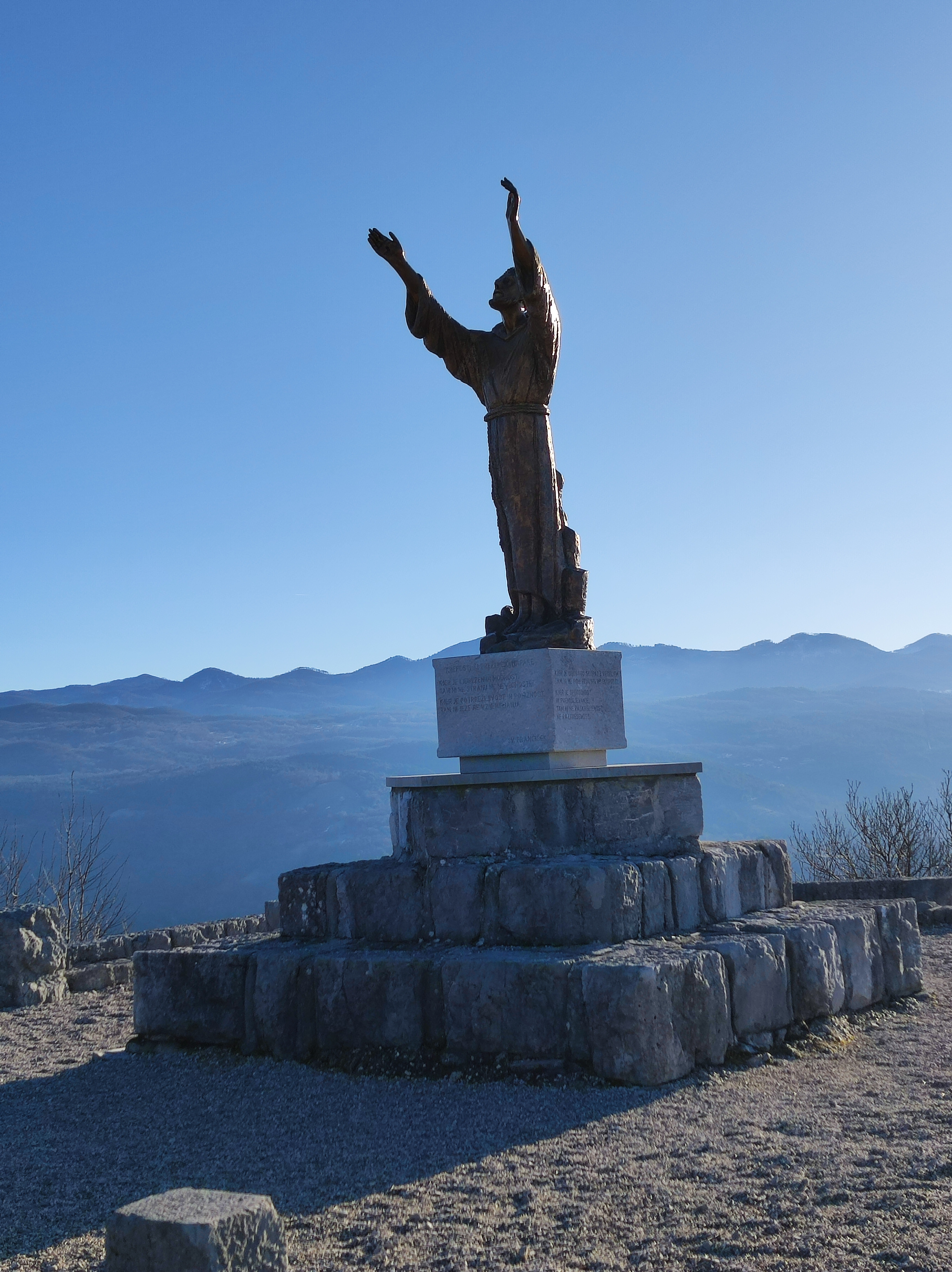
Statue of Saint Francis of Assisi, Sveta gora

Urška’s Trail is a thematic circular route leading from Grgar to the Holy Mountain (Sveta Gora). It begins at St. Martin’s Church in Grgar and features eight stops. The path continues through the western part of the village to Urška’s birth house, where a chapel now stands. Just before the village ends, a wide gravel road leads up to Preški Vrh, continuing to the Sveta Gora Basilica, which sits at 682 meters, the highest point on the route. From there, stunning views stretch from the Adriatic Sea to the Julian Alps. Near the basilica is the Marian Museum, where one room is dedicated to Shepherdess Urška. The trail continues past the basilica and after a short walk reaches the statue of Saint Francis of Assisi, which offers a beautiful view of Grgar. The trail then descends steeply back to Grgar and ends at Urška’s presumed grave beside the village church.
