= Preserje, Nova Gorica =

Preserje
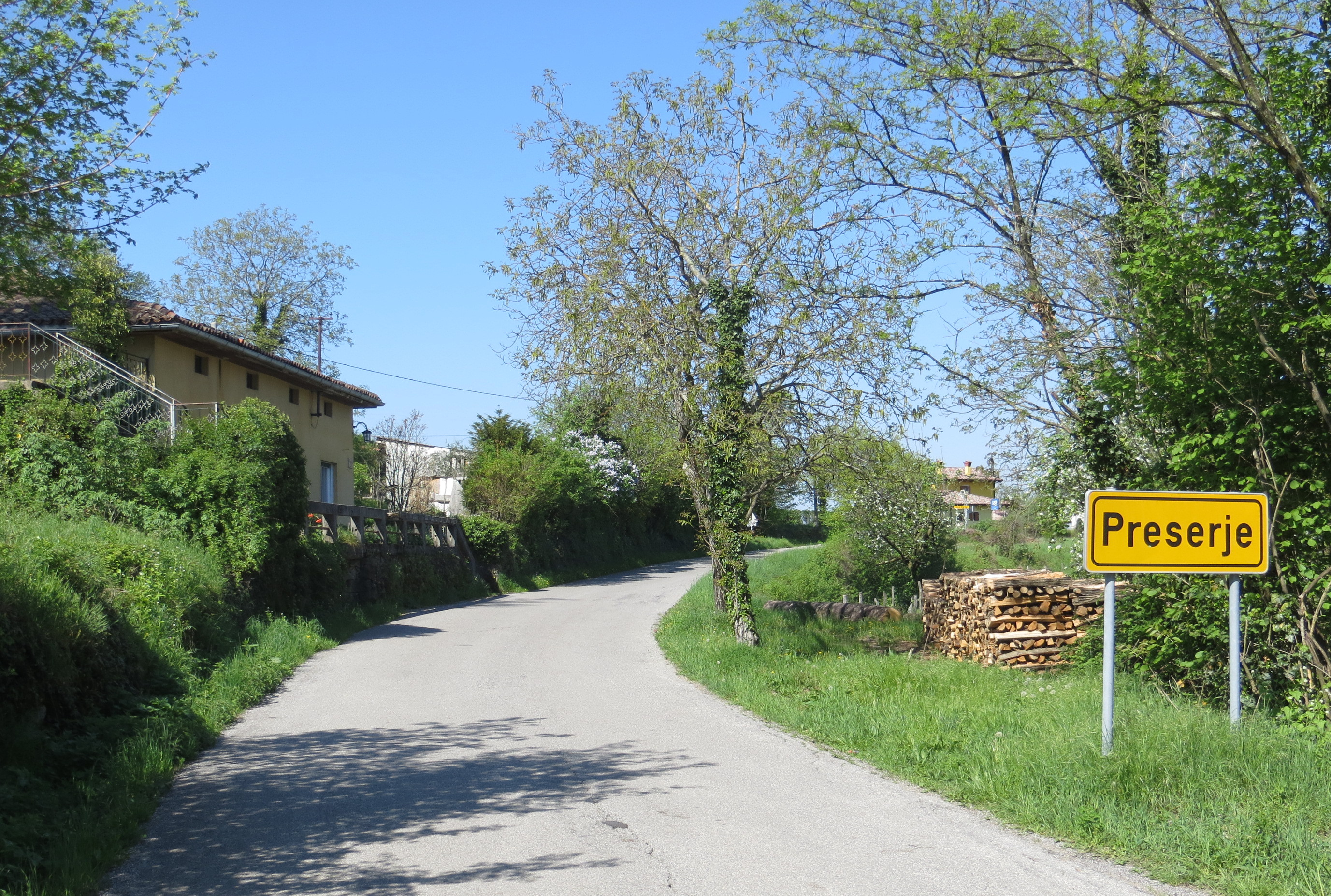

- Location in Slovenia
- Coordinates: 45°52′11.17″N 13°47′14.21″E
- Country: Slovenia
- Traditional region: Slovenian Littoral
- Statistical region: Gorizia
- Municipality: Nova Gorica

Area
  - Total: 3.4 km^{2} (1.3 sq mi)
- Elevation: 154.3 m (506 ft)

Population (2002)
  - Total: 457

Preserje (pronounced [ˈpɾeːsɛɾjɛ]; also known as Preserje nad Rihemberkom, Italian: Pressérie di Rifembergo) is a village in western Slovenia in the Municipality of Nova Gorica. It has a population of 457. It is located in the low hills above the settlement of Branik (formerly known as Rihemberk) in the Vipava Valley.

The local church is dedicated to Saint Catherine and belongs to the Parish of Branik.
