= Steske =

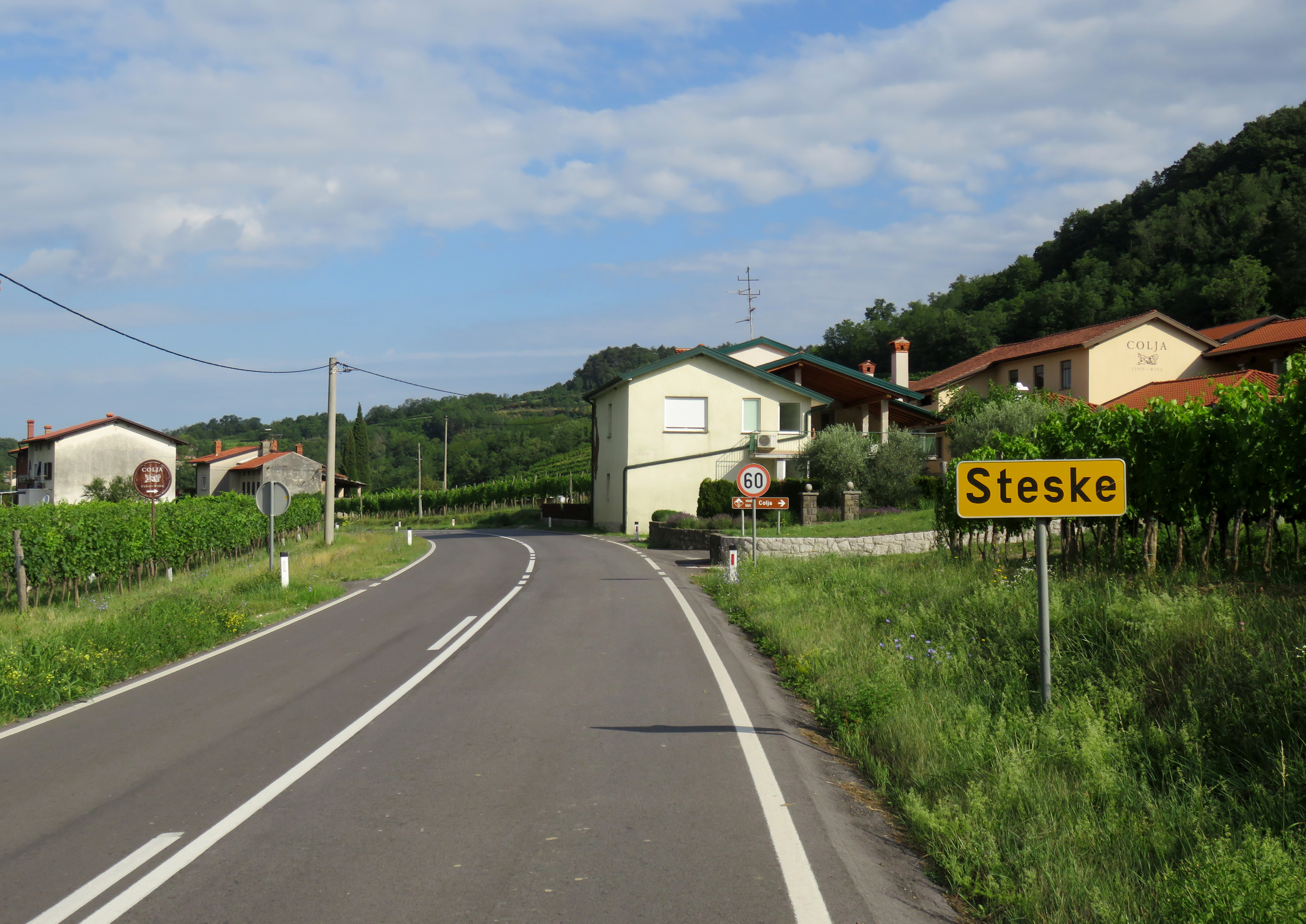

- Location in Slovenia
- Coordinates: 45°52′7.46″N 13°45′29.5″E
- Country: Slovenia
- Traditional region: Slovenian Littoral
- Statistical region: Gorizia
- Municipality: Nova Gorica

Area
  - Total: 1.92 km^{2} (0.74 sq mi)
- Elevation: 191.6 m (629 ft)

Population (2002)
  - Total: 31

Steske (pronounced [ˈsteːskɛ]) is a small settlement in western Slovenia in the Municipality of Nova Gorica. It is located near the village of Branik in the Branik Valley, part of Vipava Valley.

== Geography ==
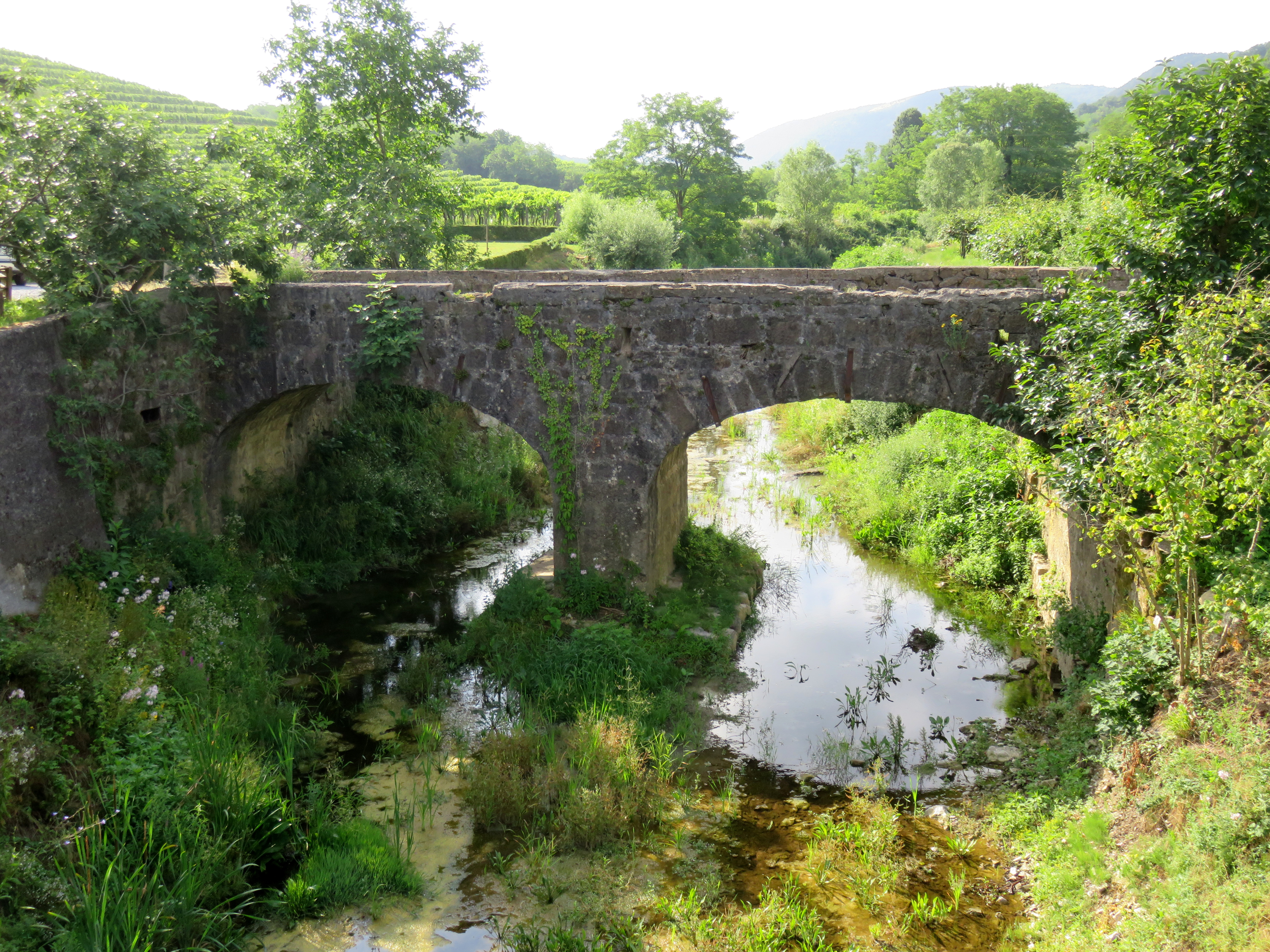
Stone bridge over the Branica River

The main part of Steske lies along the Branica River, a tributary of the Vipava River. The hamlet of Pekel lies to the northwest along the Vipava. Vrh Hill (elevation: 226 meters or 741 feet) rises to the northeast, Saint Catherine's Hill (Sveta Katarina, 223 meters or 732 feet) to the east, and Kozjak Hill (264 meters or 866 feet) to the southwest. A 19th-century stone bridge spans the Branica immediately west of the main part of the village.

== History ==
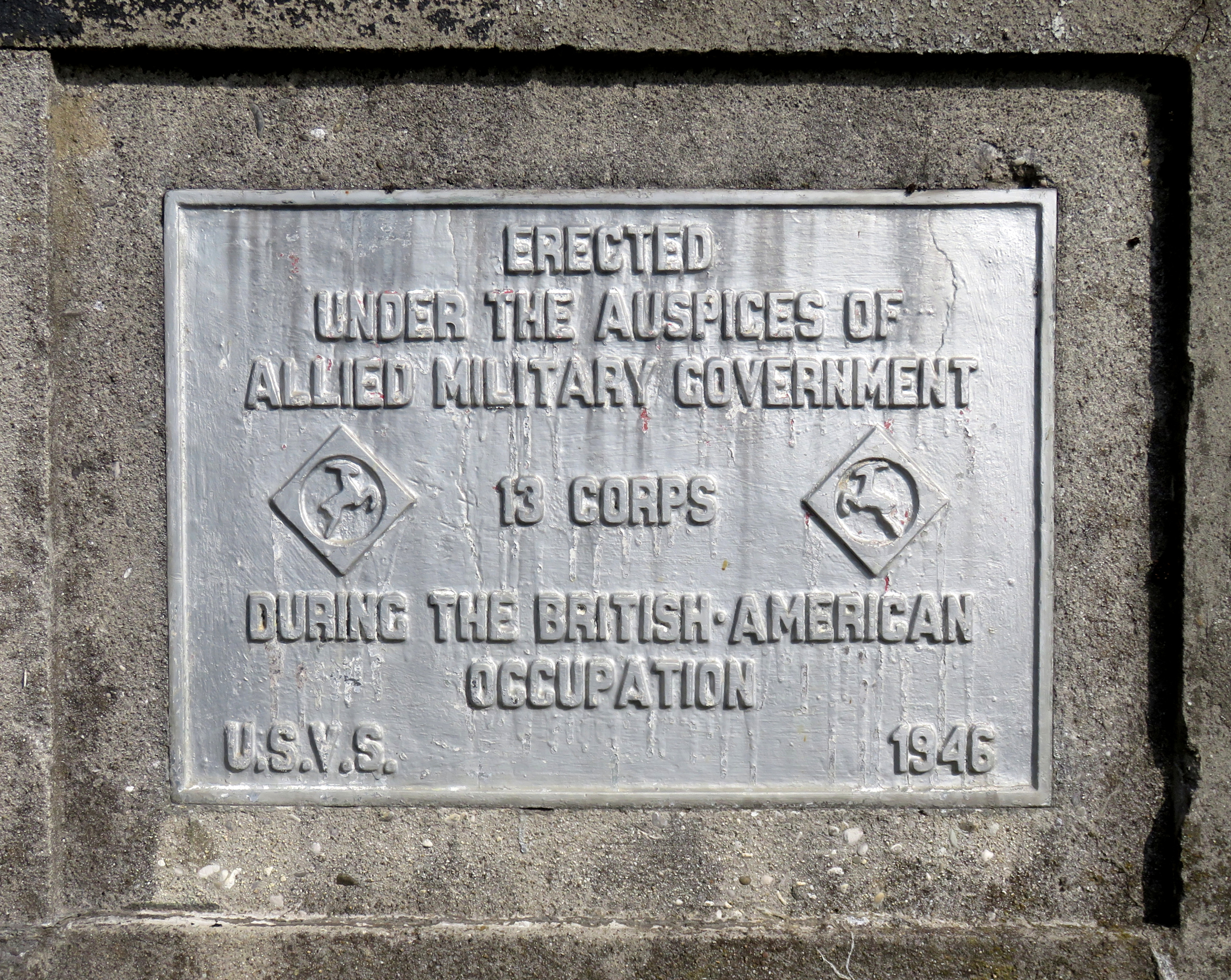
Plaque on the railroad overpass

The counts of Lanthieri built a mill along the Vipava River in Pekel in 1739. It was used by farmers from the lower Vipava Valley and the Lower Karst Plateau. A smithy was built next to it in the 19th century to produce agricultural implements, and later on a sawmill was added.

The overpass crossing the railroad west of the village was built by the Allied Military Government, which administered Zone A of the Julian March from 1945 to 1947.
