= Grgarske Ravne =

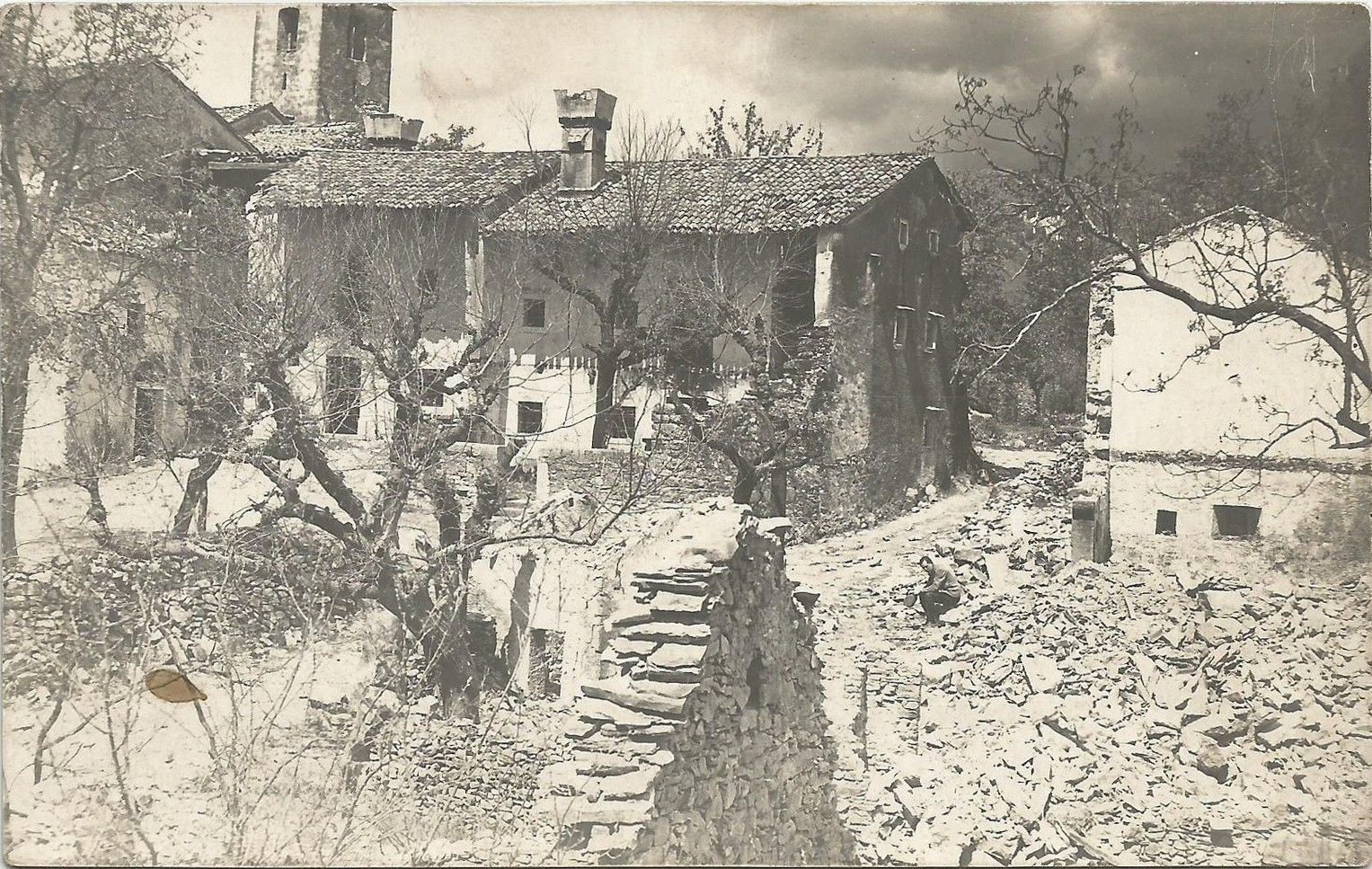
- Postcard of Grgarske Ravne, 1917

- Location in Slovenia
- Coordinates: 46°1′55.99″N 13°40′9.41″E
- Country: Slovenia
- Traditional region: Slovenian Littoral
- Statistical region: Goriška
- Municipality: Nova Gorica

Area
  - Total: 10.43 km^{2} (4.03 sq mi)
- Elevation: 517.3 m (1,697 ft)

Population (2002)
  - Total: 165

Grgarske Ravne (pronounced [ɡəɾˈɡaːɾskɛ ɾaːu̯nɛ]; Italian: Raune) is a settlement north of Grgar in the Municipality of Nova Gorica in western Slovenia. It is located on the Banjšice Plateau and it forms a local community together with the nearby village of Bate.
