= Ozeljan, Nova Gorica =

Ozeljan
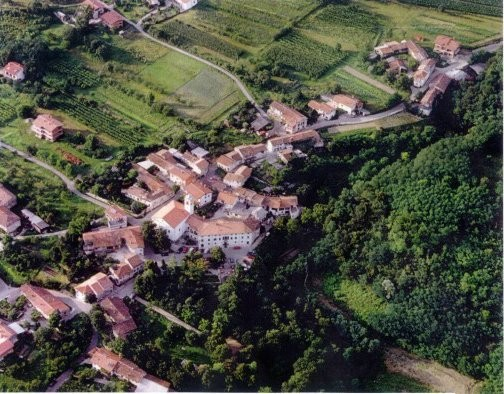

- Location in Slovenia
- Coordinates: 45°56′35.89″N 13°43′51.12″E
- Country: Slovenia
- Traditional region: Slovenian Littoral
- Statistical region: Gorizia
- Municipality: Nova Gorica

Area
  - Total: 3.74 km^{2} (1.44 sq mi)
- Elevation: 113.8 m (373 ft)

Population (2002)
  - Total: 778

Ozeljan (pronounced [ɔzɛˈljaːn]; Italian: Ossegliano) is a village in the lower Vipava Valley in western Slovenia. It is part of the Municipality of Nova Gorica in the Gorizia region of the Slovenian Littoral.

The core of the village was built around the church dedicated to Saint James and the Coronnini mansion. The church belongs to the Parish of Šempas.

== History ==
The settlement was first mentioned in the 12th century (in the year 1176). The village was part of the Parish of Šempas. In the former times the locals were mainly farmers.
