= Battle of Trnovo =

- Part of World War II in Yugoslavia
Date	19–21 January 1945
Location	Tarnova della Selva, Italian Social Republic (moderm day Trnovo, Nova Gorica, Slovenia)
Result	Partisan victory

Belligerents
Yugoslavia: Slovene Partisans	Italian Social Republic

The Battle of Trnovo was a battle between Slovene partisans and Italian Social Republic troops. It took place between January 19–21, 1945 in Slovene Littoral.
