= Šmaver, Nova Gorica =

Šmaver
- Location in Slovenia
- Coordinates: 46°0′13.27″N 13°37′21.75″E
- Country: Slovenia
- Traditional region: Slovenian Littoral
- Statistical region: Gorizia
- Municipality: Nova Gorica

Area
  - Total: 4 km^{2} (1.5 sq mi)
- Elevation: 291.2 m (955 ft)

Population (2002)
  - Total: 0

Šmaver (pronounced [ˈʃmaːʋər]; Italian: San Mauro) is a settlement on the right bank of the Soča River north of Solkan in the Municipality of Nova Gorica in western Slovenia.

== Name ==
Locally, Šmaver is known as Štamaver or Šentmaver.

== History ==
The actual settlement of San Mauro remained in Italy, whereas the area of Šmaver with the eastern slopes of Mount Sabotin, now without any permanent residents, was annexed to the Socialist Federal Republic of Yugoslavia in 1947.
