= Bate, Nova Gorica =

Bate
- Location in Slovenia
- Coordinates: 46°2′42.64″N 13°40′37.14″E
- Country: Slovenia
- Traditional region: Slovenian Littoral
- Statistical region: Gorizia
- Municipality: Nova Gorica

Area
  - Total: 10.16 km^{2} (3.92 sq mi)
- Elevation: 589.1 m (1,933 ft)

Population (2002)
  - Total: 1,820

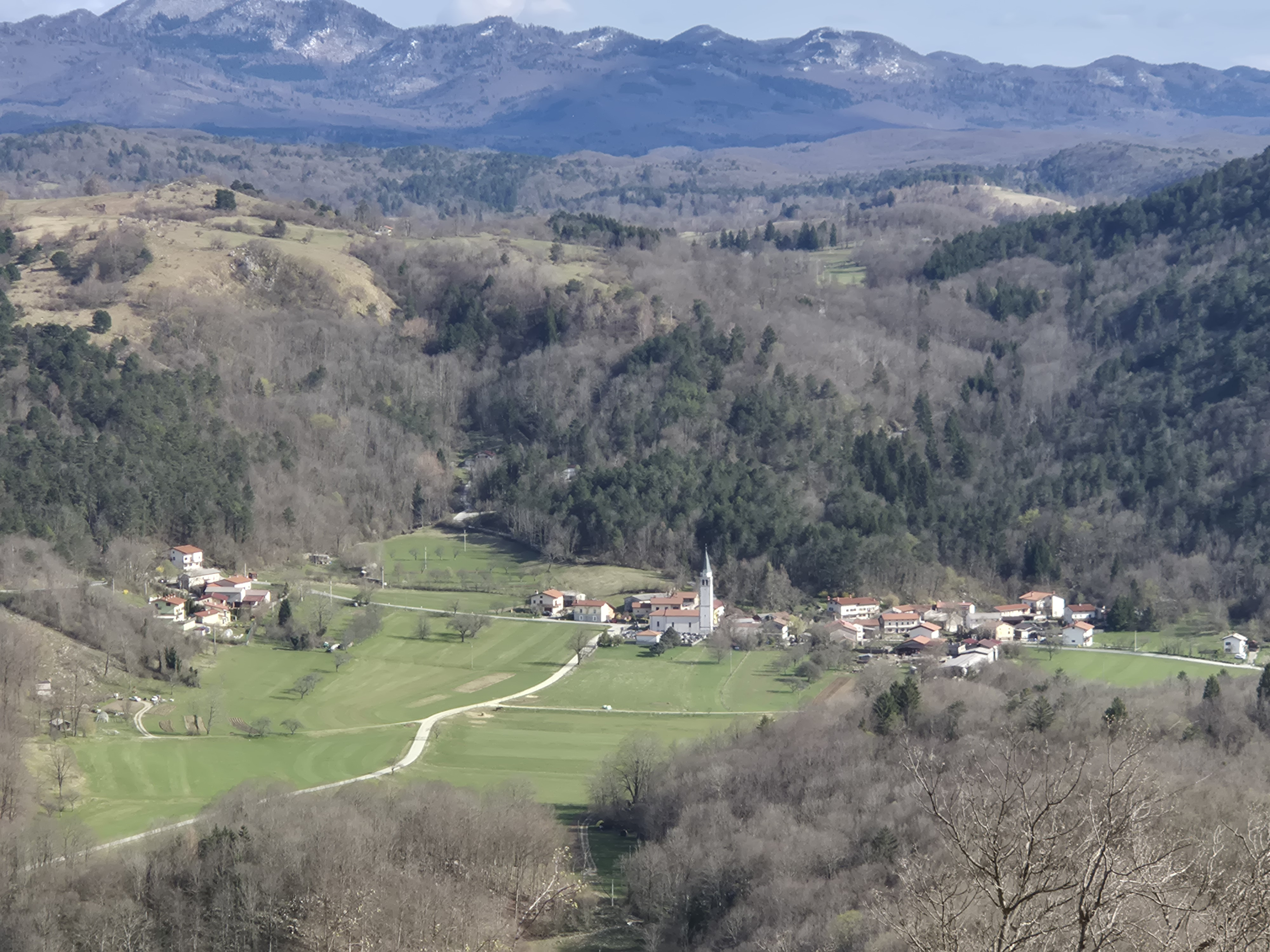

Bate (pronounced [ˈbaːtɛ]; Italian: Battaglia della Bainsizza or Bainsizza San Lorenzo) is a village in western Slovenia in the Municipality of Nova Gorica. It is located on the Banjšice Plateau. It is part of the Gorizia area of the wider traditional region of the Slovenian Littoral, and is now part of the Gorizia Statistical Region. It includes the hamlets of Dolenji Konec, Gorenji Konec, Na Placu, and Breščaki in the main settlement, as well as Čafarini, Humarji, Sveto, Ježevec, Madoni, Jelaršče, Pičulini, Podlaka, Sedevčiči, and Čeferinovšče.

== Name ==
The name Bate is derived from a plural accusative form of the root *bęt-. The root *bęt- is believed to be of substratum origin, borrowed from the name of the Veneti people. During the Italian annexation of the Julian March, the village was officially named Battaglia della Bainsizza (literary, 'Battle of the Banjšice Plateau') to honour the Eleventh Battle of the Isonzo, which took place nearby. Before that, the traditional Italian name of the village was Bainsizza San Lorenzo.

== History ==
The village was greatly affected by the First World War because Italian forces passed through Bate to reach the Banjšice Plateau. A memorial plaque in the hamlet of Sveto commemorates the Italian advance. Many traditional Littoral-style houses were damaged during the war, but were renovated afterwards. The village is also the site of an abandoned Austro-Hungarian military cemetery containing the remains of about 5,000 soldiers in unmarked graves. During the Second World War a Partisan courier service was active in the village.

== Church ==
The parish church in the settlement is dedicated to the Holy Cross and belongs to the Diocese of Koper. The church dates from 1611. A second church in the hamlet of Podlaka is dedicated to the Assumption of Mary.
