= Urban Municipality of Nova Gorica =

Urban municipality of Slovenia

Urban Municipality of Nova Gorica Mestna občina Nova Gorica
- Municipality
- Flag Coat of arms

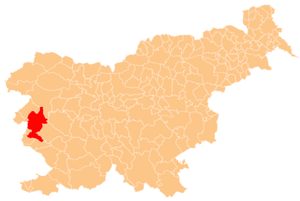
- Location of the Urban Municipality of Nova Gorica in Slovenia
- Coordinates: 45°59′N 13°44′E
- Country: Slovenia

Government
  - Mayor: Samo Turel (GS)

Area
  - Total: 280 km^{2} (110 sq mi)

Population (2018)
  - Total: 31,691
  - Density: 110/km^{2} (290/sq mi)
- Time zone: UTC+01 (CET)
  - Summer (DST): UTC+02 (CEST)
- Website: https://www.nova-gorica.si/

The Urban Municipality of Nova Gorica (pronounced [ˈnɔ̀ːʋa ɡɔˈɾìːtsa]; Slovene: Mestna občina Nova Gorica) is a municipality in the traditional region of the Slovene Littoral in western Slovenia. The seat of the municipality is the city of Nova Gorica. Nova Gorica became a municipality in 1994. It borders Italy.

== Settlements ==
In addition to the municipal seat of Nova Gorica, the municipality also includes the following settlements:

- Ajševica
- Banjšice
- Bate
- Branik
- Brdo
- Budihni
- Čepovan
- Dornberk
- Draga
- Dragovica
- Gradišče nad Prvačino
- Grgar
- Grgarske Ravne
- Kromberk
- Lazna
- Loke
- Lokovec
- Lokve
- Nemci
- Osek
- Ozeljan
- Pedrovo
- Podgozd
- Potok pri Dornberku
- Preserje
- Pristava
- Prvačina
- Ravnica
- Rožna Dolina
- Saksid
- Šempas
- Šmaver
- Šmihel
- Solkan
- Spodnja Branica
- Stara Gora
- Steske
- Sveta Gora
- Tabor
- Trnovo
- Vitovlje
- Voglarji
- Zalošče

== Politics ==
The municipality of Nova Gorica is governed by a mayor, elected every four years by popular vote, and a city council of 32 members. Both in local and national elections, Nova Gorica has been considered an electoral stronghold of the left, in particular of the Social Democrats. Between the early 1990s and the mid-2000s, the two major political parties in the town were the Social Democrats and Liberal Democracy of Slovenia, both considered center-left parties. Since 1994, these two parties have been alternating in power at the local level, running candidates against each other and forming coalitions with smaller center-right parties in order to gain an absolute majority in the city council.

The Nova Gorica electoral district is the home district of Borut Pahor, former prime minister and former president of Slovenia; it was also the only district in the country where the Social Democrats won the plurality of votes in the 2011 elections.
