= Banjšice =

- Location in Slovenia
- Coordinates: 46°3′10.64″N 13°42′40.87″E
- Country: Slovenia
- Traditional region: Slovenian Littoral
- Statistical region: Gorizia
- Municipality: Nova Gorica

Area
  - Total: 14.45 km^{2} (5.58 sq mi)
- Elevation: 670.9 m (2,201 ft)

Population (2002)
  - Total: 264

Banjšice (pronounced [ˈbaːnʃitsɛ]; Italian: Bainsizza or Bainsizza Santo Spirito) is a settlement in western Slovenia in the Municipality of Nova Gorica. It has a population of 264. It is located on the high Banjšice Plateau, overlooking the Soča Valley. It is made up of several hamlets, including Breg, Lohke, Ošlakarji, Mrcinje, Trušnje, Podlešče, Raven, Kuščarji, and Krvavec.

The parish church in the settlement is dedicated to the Holy Spirit and belongs to the Diocese of Koper.
