= Prvačina =

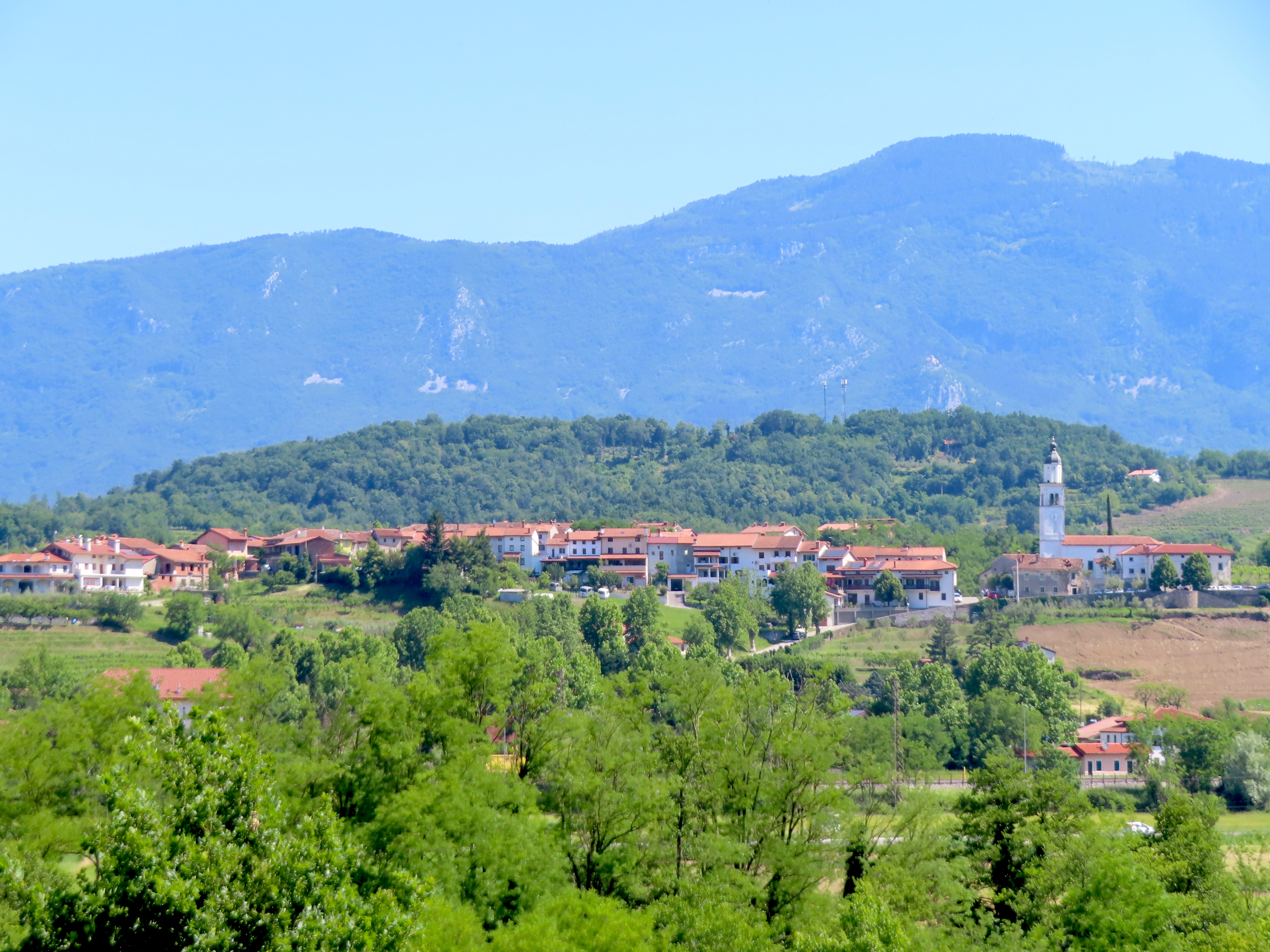

- Location in Slovenia
- Coordinates: 45°53′16.36″N 13°43′23.19″E
- Country: Slovenia
- Traditional region: Slovenian Littoral
- Statistical region: Gorizia
- Municipality: Nova Gorica

Area
  - Total: 4.6 km^{2} (1.8 sq mi)
- Elevation: 58.4 m (192 ft)

Population (2002)
  - Total: 1,169

Prvačina (pronounced [pəɾˈʋaːtʃina]; Italian: Prevacina) is a village in the Vipava Valley in western Slovenia. It is located in the Municipality of Nova Gorica.

== Church ==
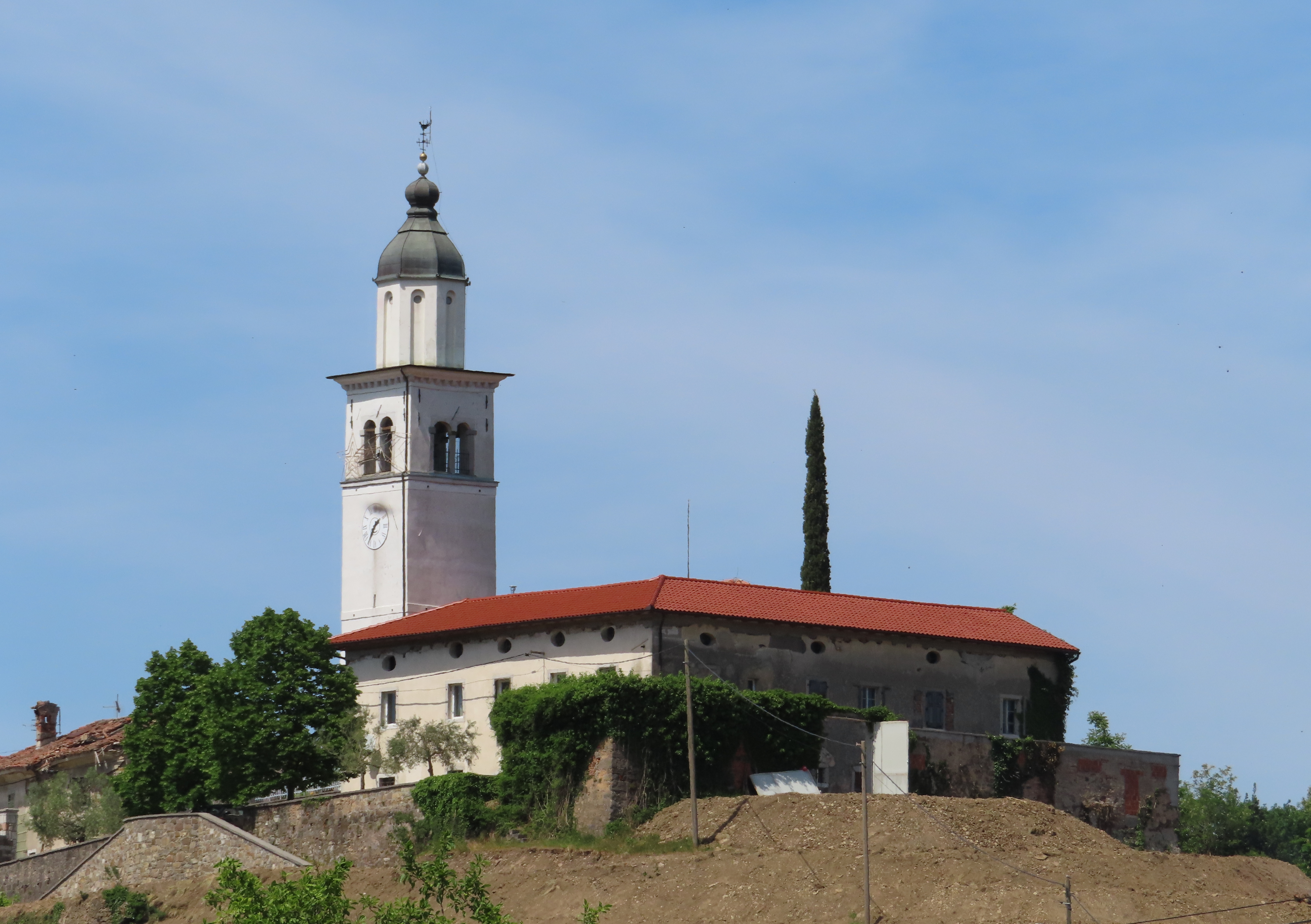
Saint Andrew's Church and rectory

The parish church in the settlement is dedicated to Saint Andrew and belongs to the Diocese of Koper.
