= Osek, Nova Gorica =

Osek
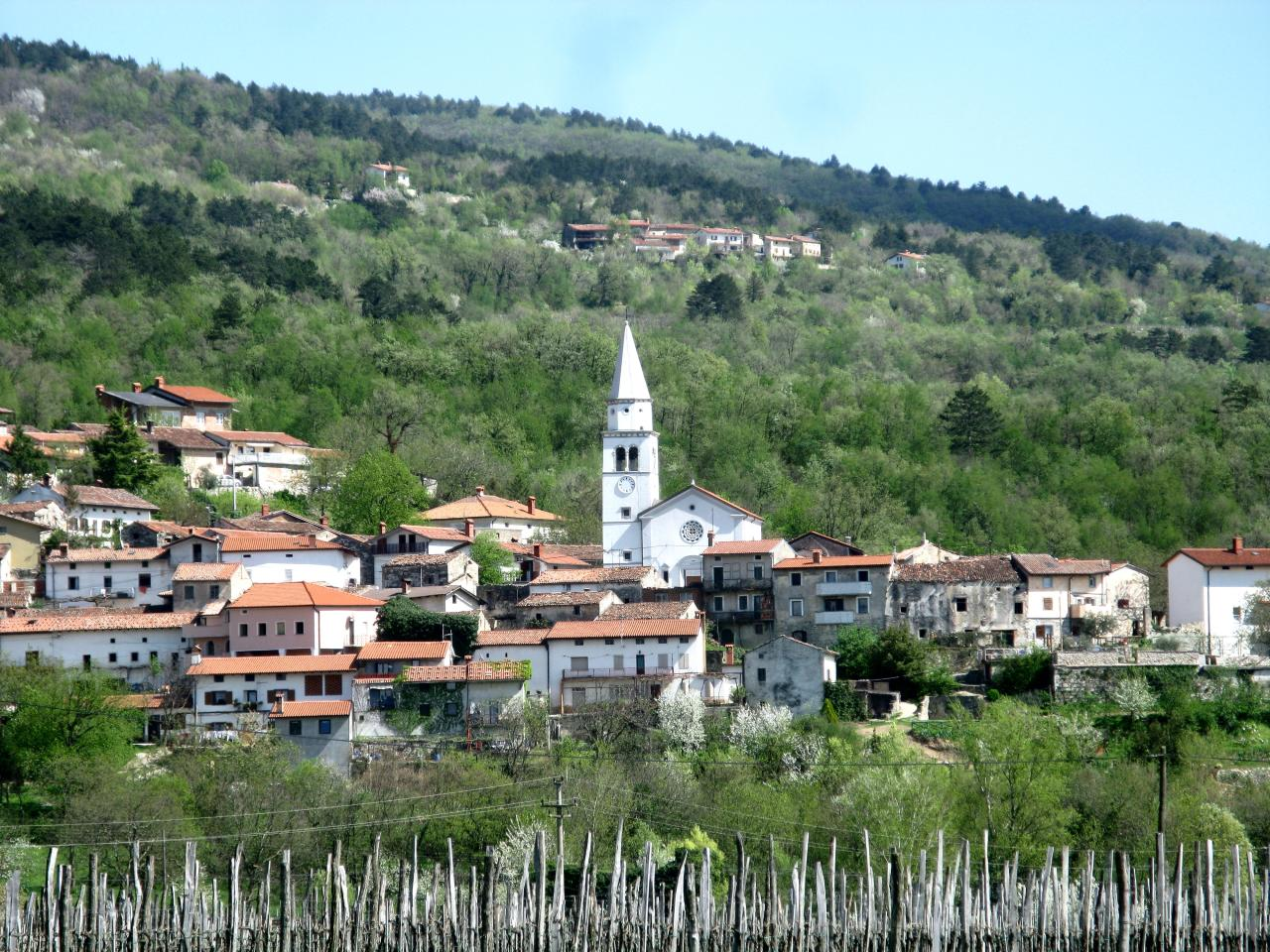

- Location in Slovenia
- Coordinates: 45°55′16.24″N 13°45′52.68″E
- Country: Slovenia
- Traditional region: Slovenian Littoral
- Statistical region: Gorizia
- Municipality: Nova Gorica

Area
  - Total: 8.56 km^{2} (3.31 sq mi)
- Elevation: 161.2 m (529 ft)

Population (2002)
  - Total: 342

Osek (pronounced [ˈoːsɛk]; Italian: Ossecca Vittuglia) is a village in western Slovenia in the Municipality of Nova Gorica. It is located in the Vipava Valley in the Gorizia region of the Slovene Littoral.

The parish church in the settlement is dedicated to Saint Martin and belongs to the Diocese of Koper.
