= Lokve, Nova Gorica =

Lokve
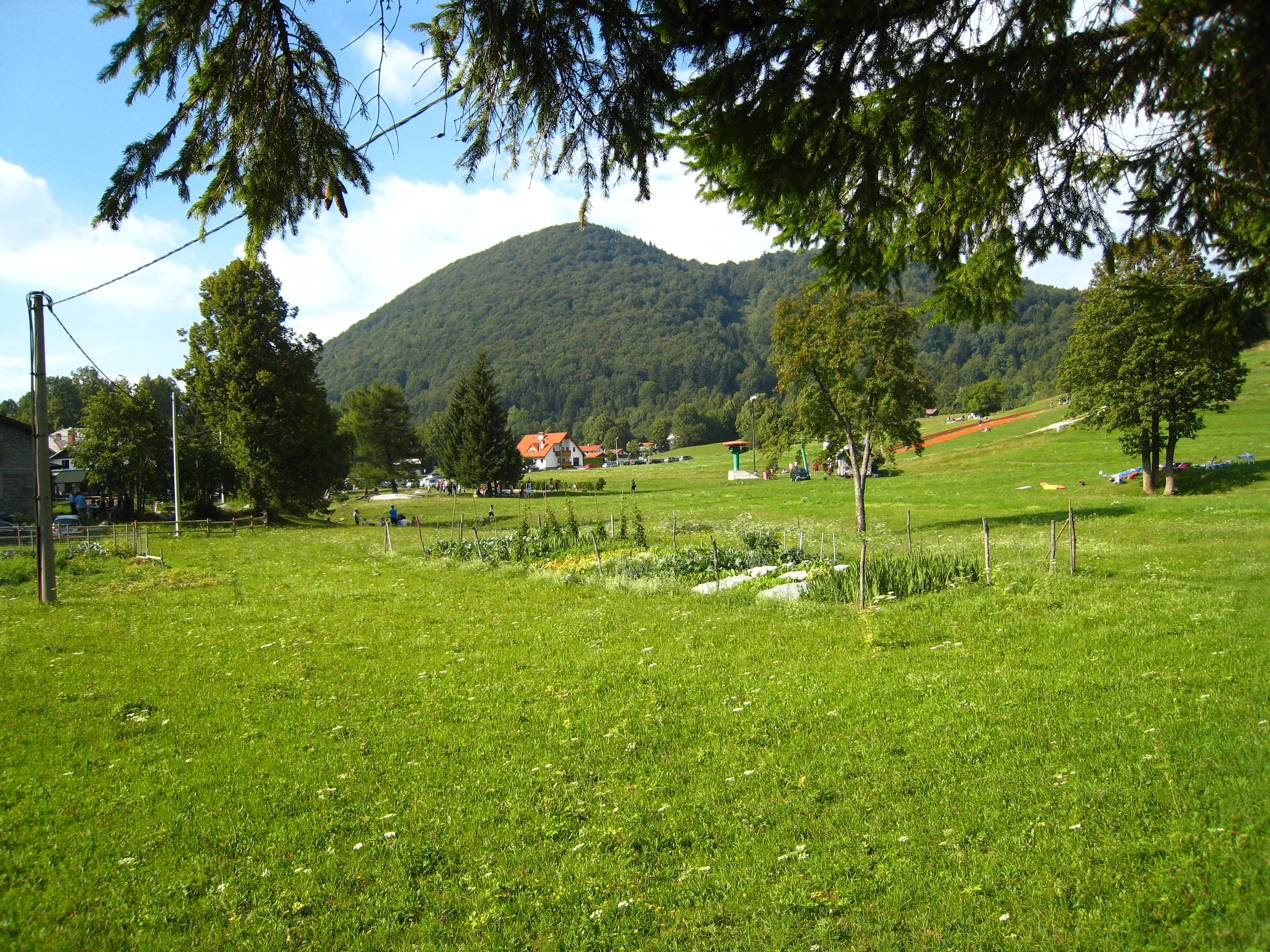
- View of Lokve and Škol Hill

- Location in Slovenia
- Coordinates: 46°0′39.14″N 13°47′19.41″E
- Country: Slovenia
- Traditional region: Slovenian Littoral
- Statistical region: Gorizia
- Municipality: Nova Gorica

Area
  - Total: 27.04 km^{2} (10.44 sq mi)
- Elevation: 928.6 m (3,047 ft)

Population (2002)
  - Total: 122

Lokve (pronounced [ˈloːkʋɛ]; Italian: Loqua) is a village in western Slovenia in the Municipality of Nova Gorica. It is located on the Trnovo Forest Plateau, above the Vipava Valley in the Gorizia region of the Slovene Littoral. It is a popular tourist center, serving as a summer resort for people from the towns of Nova Gorica and Gorizia (Italy). Škol Hill (Škol; 1,182 metres or 3,878 feet) rises north of Lokve.

== Mass grave ==
Lokve is the site of a former mass grave from the Second World War. The Lokve Mass Grave (Slovene: Grobišče Lokve) is located in a depression near house no. 43 in the village. It contained the remains of Italian soldiers from the 10th Assault Vehicle Flotilla killed at the site in March 1945. The remains were discovered during excavations in December 2003 and were reburied in May 2004.

== Church ==
The parish church in the settlement is dedicated to Saint Anthony of Padua and belongs to the Diocese of Koper.

== Notable people ==
Notable people that were born or lived in Lokve include:

- Leon Rupnik (1880–1946), general
- Venceslav Winkler (1907–1975), writer

== See also ==
- Gorizia and Gradisca
- Austrian Littoral
- Julian March
- Tourism in Slovenia
