= Čepovan =

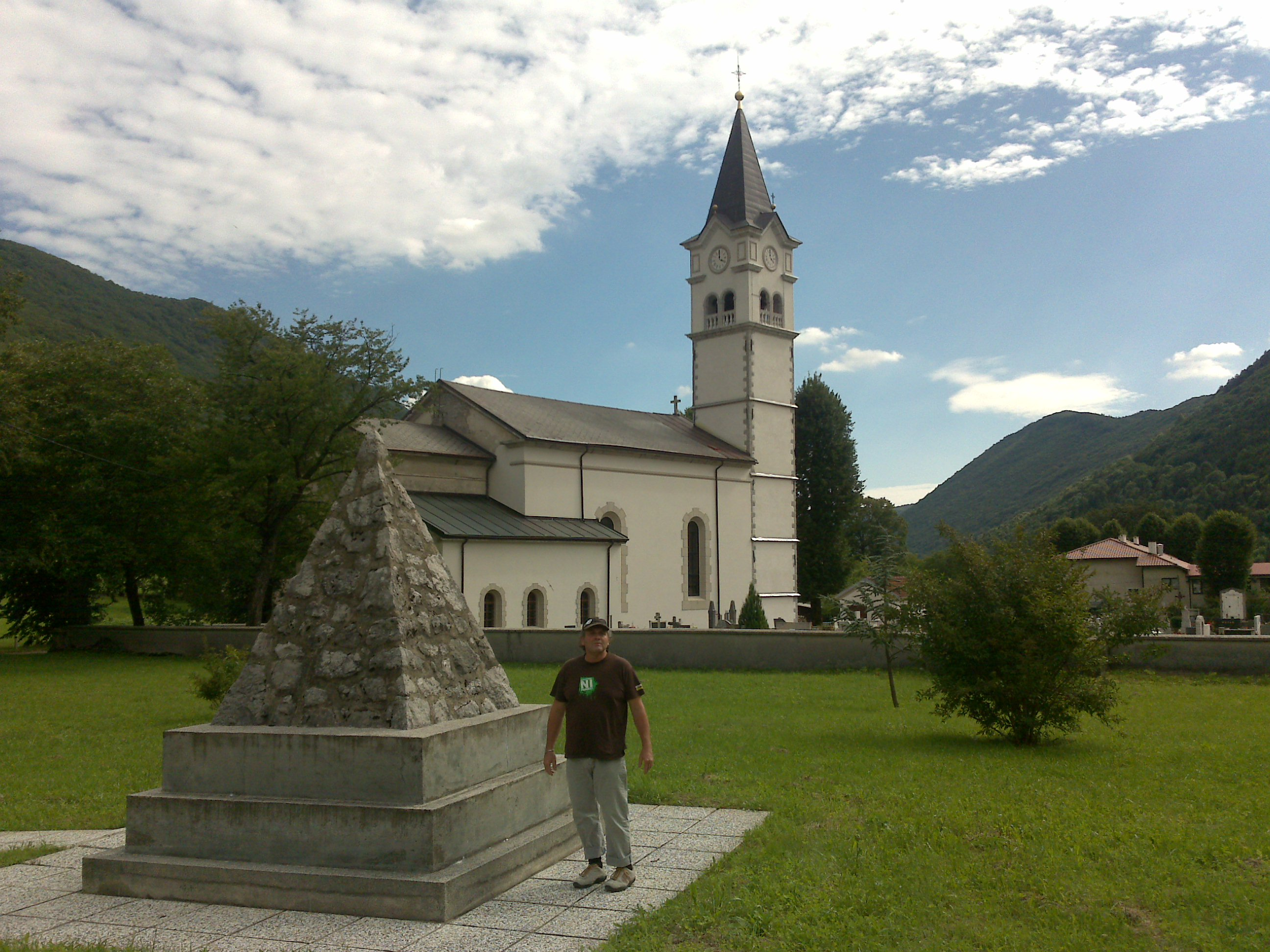
- The former parish church in Čepovan

- Location in Slovenia
- Coordinates: 46°2′58.93″N 13°47′35.9″E
- Country: Slovenia
- Traditional region: Slovenian Littoral
- Statistical region: Gorizia
- Municipality: Nova Gorica

Area
  - Total: 20 km^{2} (7.7 sq mi)
- Elevation: 604.4 m (1,983 ft)

Population (2002)
  - Total: 365

Čepovan (pronounced [ˈtʃeːpɔʋan]; Italian: Chiapovano, German: Tschepobon) is a settlement in the Municipality of Nova Gorica in western Slovenia. Apart from the main village of Čepovan, it extends to include a number of smaller hamlets in the valley known as Čepovanski Dol: Dol, Drage, Frata, Griva, Lazna, Močile, Podčepovna, Pod Goro (Slovene: Pod goro), Puštale, Robe, Rut, Šulgi, Tesno, Vrata, and Vrše.

== Name ==
Čepovan was attested in written sources in 1301 as Kampowan (and as Zampuano in 1377 and Tschepawan in 1507). The name may be borrowed from a Romance reflex of Latin *clampuānum, which may be related to the Latin place name Clampētia. On the other hand, it may be a borrowing from a word based on Friulian ciamp 'field'.

== History ==
The parish priest Blaž Grčar opened a lace-making school in Čepovan in 1890, helping promote this home industry. The settlement was affected by the First World War, reminders of which include an abandoned military cemetery. During the Second World War, a Partisan field hospital was located in the hamlet of Vrše, and a command bunker to the north in nearby Grudnica. In January 1944 a Partisan officers' school was set up in Čepovan; it was soon thereafter relocated to Cerkno. In May 1944, after the Armistice of Cassibile, a district Partisan conference was held in the hamlet of Lazna, and a regional conference on 12 July. German aerial bombardments in April, July, and October 1944 destroyed much of the settlement.

=== Mass grave ===
Čepovan was the site of a mass grave from the Second World War. The Čepovan Mass Grave (Slovene: Grobišče Čepovan) was located north of the main settlement, 130 m south of the house at Čepovan no. 143. It contained the remains of five Italian soldiers that fell in battle on 18 December 1943. The remains were exhumed in 1999 and transferred to Italy.

== Church ==
The former parish church in the settlement is dedicated to John the Baptist and belongs to the Grgar Parish of the Diocese of Koper. A small church further up the valley in the hamlet of Puštale is dedicated to the Sacred Heart of Jesus.

== Notable people ==
Notable people that were born or lived in Čepovan include:

- Franjo Kafol (1891–1965), orchard expert
- Miroslav Plesničar (1872–1929), translator
- Anton Podgornik (1881–1964), agriculture, dairy, and grazing specialist
- Anton Karel Podgornik (1878–1960), politician
- Franc Podgornik (1846–1904), journalist, editor, and translator
