= Banjšice Plateau =

Karst plateau in western Slovenia

Coordinates: 46°2′56.58″N 13°41′59.82″E

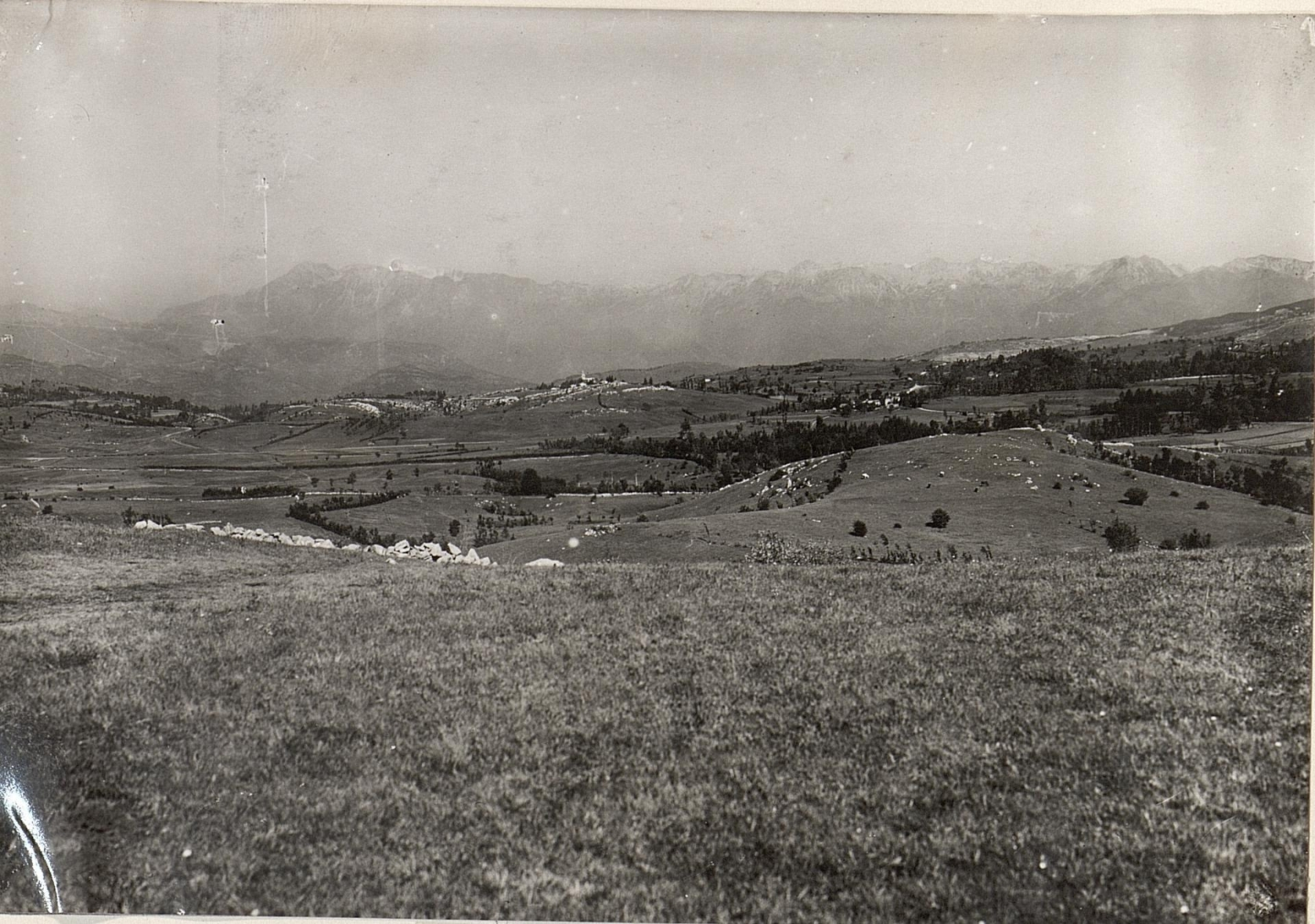
Banjšice Plateau in 1917

The Banjšice Plateau (Slovene: Banjška planota, also Banjšice or Banjščice, Italian: Altopiano della Bainsizza) is a karst plateau in western Slovenia, in the traditional region of Goriška. It is a widely settled area, distinguished by its history and biodiversity. Geographically, it belongs to the Dinaric Alps.

== Geography ==
The plateau lies about 5 kilometres (3.1 mi) north of the town of Nova Gorica, above the Soča River to the west, the Idrijca to the north, and the narrow and deep Čepovan Valley to the east and the south. It covers about 100 km^{2} (39 sq mi), raises from the west towards the east, and is about 700 m (2,300 ft) high in its central part. The climate is mainly continental, though with plenty of precipitation and a long-lasting snow cover, except for the southern slopes that are subjected to the Mediterranean influences. The rocks are mainly dolomite and limestone, with some flysch in the northern and southern areas. The surface has been shaped by a number of tectonic faults, with the largest, the Avče Fault, dividing the plateau into the northern and the southern half.

== History ==
During World War I, the Italian and the Austro-Hungarian Army fought in the Eleventh Battle of the Isonzo on the plateau from August until September 1917.

== Settlements ==
The plateau was named after the village of Banjšice, which is most probably the oldest settlement on the plateau. The other settlements, comprising a number of hamlets, are Bate, Grgarske Ravne, Kal nad Kanalom, and Lokovec. Traditionally, the villages on the plateau used to gravitate towards Kanal ob Soči and partially towards Grgar and Solkan. Nowadays, they are included in the municipalities of Nova Gorica and Kanal.

== Demography ==
The population on the plateau has been steadily falling. People are mainly of higher age and poorly educated.

== Economy ==
Most of the plateau is extensively cultivated, with meadows, pastures and old high-tree orchards, however the only significant farming is husbandry. Some smaller factories opened on the plateau in the 1970s, but were later closed and today, also due to better roads, many locals work in the nearby valleys.

== Biodiversity ==
The predominant floral species are Danthonia alpina and Scorzonera villosa, forming grasslands, in which flourish endangered and endemic species, such as e.g. Iris sibirica subsp. erirrhiza, Asphodelus albus, Muscari botryoides, Saxifraga tenella, Scopolia carniolica, and Medicago pironae. There are also some forests of Fagus sylvatica and Sesleria autumnalis in the southwest, and Carpinus betulus in the lower parts of the plateau.

A number of birds and over 80 species of butterflies (47% of all the species in the country) have been spotted there. Among the birds, the most important species are the European nightjar (Caprimulgus europaeus), the woodlark (Lullula arborea), the red-backed shrike (Lanius collurio), and the European honey buzzard (Pernis apivorus). The significant butterfly species are Euphydryas aurinia, Coenonympha oedippus (its most northern area), Zerynthia polyxena, and Lopinga achine.
