= Grgar =

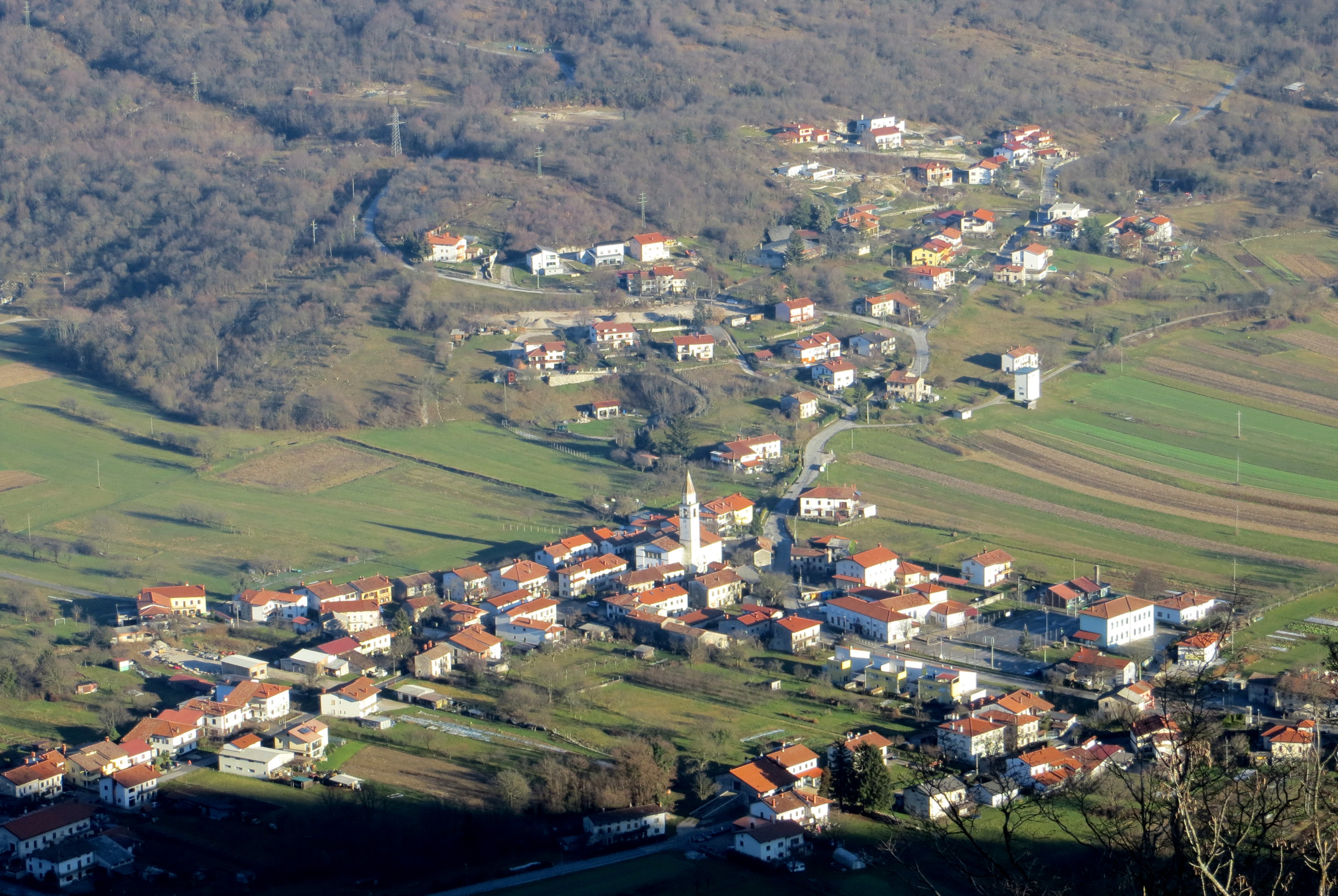

- Location in Slovenia
- Coordinates: 46°0′2.6″N 13°40′7.48″E
- Country: Slovenia
- Traditional region: Slovenian Littoral
- Statistical region: Gorizia
- Municipality: Nova Gorica

Area
  - Total: 16.87 km^{2} (6.51 sq mi)
- Elevation: 297.4 m (976 ft)

Population (2015)
  - Total: 813

Grgar (pronounced [ˈɡəɾɡaɾ]; Italian: Gargaro) is a village in western Slovenia in the Municipality of Nova Gorica. It is located under Holy Mount (Slovene: Sveta gora), above the Soča Valley and below the Banjšice Plateau.

== Name ==
Grgar was mentioned in written sources c. 1370 as Gaergaer and in 1389 as Grêgôr. For phonological and morphological reasons, the latter attestation appears to be a hypercorrection and not connected with Saint Gregory or the name Gregor 'Gregory'. Instead, the name may be derived from another Romance base, perhaps *gregārius 'shepherd'.

== Mass graves ==
Grgar is the site of two known mass graves associated with the Second World War. The Podgomila Shaft Mass Grave (Slovene: Grobišče Brezno Podgomila), also known as the Miljavec Shaft Mass Grave (Grobišče Miljavčev brezen), is located on the left side of the road to Grgarske Ravne, about 1 kilometer (0.62 mi) north of Grgar. It contains the remains of Home Guard and Italian prisoners of war, and Slovene and Italian civilians murdered in May 1945. The Jošč Shaft Mass Grave (Grobišče Joščevo brezno) is located on the left side of the road to Grgarske Ravne, about 1 kilometer (0.62 mi) north of Grgar. It contains the remains of unknown victims.

== Church ==
The parish church in the settlement is dedicated to Saint Martin and belongs to the Diocese of Koper.

== Notable people ==
Notable people that were born or lived in Grgar include:

- Matej Bor, pen name of Vladimir Pavšič (1913–1993), poet
- Urška Ferligoj (1526–1544), shepherdess and Marian seeress
