= Šempas =

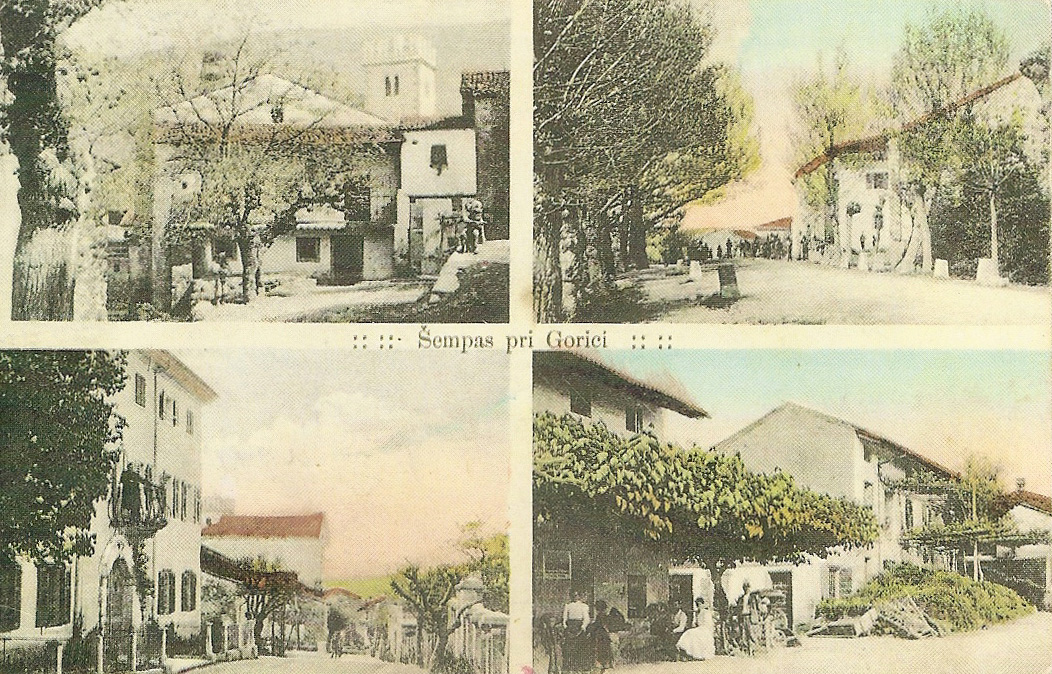
- 1915 postcard of Šempas

- Location in Slovenia
- Coordinates: 45°55′42.93″N 13°44′35.96″E
- Country: Slovenia
- Traditional region: Slovenian Littoral
- Statistical region: Gorizia
- Municipality: Nova Gorica

Area
  - Total: 5.94 km^{2} (2.29 sq mi)
- Elevation: 96.9 m (318 ft)

Population (2002)
  - Total: 1,066

Šempas (pronounced [ʃɛmˈpas] or [ʃəmˈpas]; in older sources also Šenpas, Italian: Sambasso, German: Schönpass) is a village in the Vipava Valley in the Municipality of Nova Gorica in western Slovenia.

== Name ==
The name of the settlement was first attested circa 1200 as in sancto Passo (and as Sand Pass in 1485 and Sannd Pass in 1523). The Slovene name is derived from šent Pas, referring to either Saint Bassus of Lucera or Saint Bassus of Nice, to whom the parish church was formerly dedicated.

== Church ==
The parish church in the settlement is dedicated to Saint Sylvester and belongs to the Diocese of Koper.
