= Trnovo Forest Plateau =

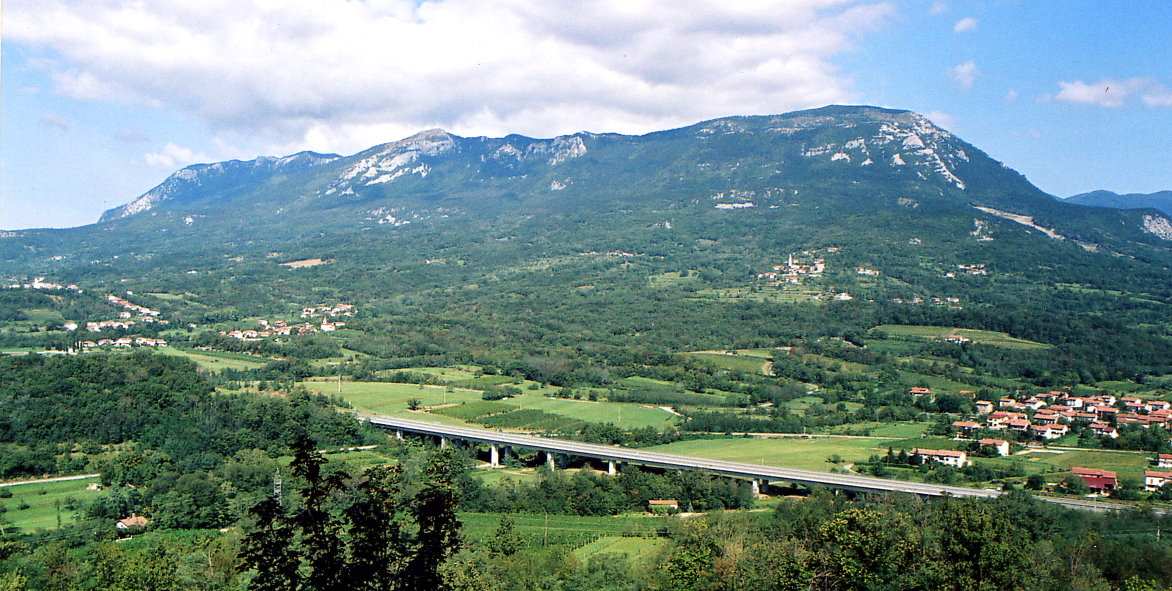
- The Trnovo Forest Plateau seen from Vipavski Križ

Highest point
- Coordinates: 45°57′46″N 13°52′20″E

Geography
- Location within Slovenia
- Location: Slovenia
- Parent range: Dinaric Alps

The Trnovo Forest Plateau (Slovene: Trnovski gozd) is a karst plateau that constitutes the extreme northwest end of the Dinaric Alps. The Trnovo Forest Plateau has a karst character, without surface watercourses and broken up by closed valleys, outcroppings, hills, caves, shafts, and smaller karst features: solution pans, rills, karrens, and other features. Significant karst features include ice caves. The vegetation inversion at Big Paradana Ice Cave (Slovene: Velika ledena jama v Paradani) in the eastern part of the plateau, measuring 385 meters (1,263 ft) by 1,550 meters (5,090 ft), is a locus classicus and in the past ice was harvested from it and exported via Gorizia and Trieste to Egypt.

The Trnovo Forest Plateau has three nature reserves:

- Big Paradana Ice Cave
- Golak Peaks (1,495 meters or 4,905 feet) and Spruce Valley (Slovene: Smrekova draga, a karst depression)
- The Smrečje forest reserve

The southern ridge of the Trnovo Forest Plateau is Čaven.

== Terrain ==
The influence of tectonic activity is very evident in the area. There are many depressions, solution valleys, small karst poljes, and the remains of former river valleys. During the Pliocene the rivers leveled the tectonic upwelling and filled the valleys. Traces were also left by Pliocene glaciation because glaciers created small cirques on what had been a relatively level surface, as well as ground moraines and terminal moraines. The rivers transported gravel and deposited it in lower areas, filling the depressions.

== Rock ==
The north side of the plateau shows tectonic formation along the Idrija Fault oriented in the Dinaric direction, and the south side shows the results of tectonic thrusting of Mesozoic limestone and dolomite over younger Eocene flysch. Two-thirds of the surface is covered by limestone, one-fourth by dolomite, and the remainder is flysch and loose material.

== Mountains ==
The highest summit is Big Mount Golak (Veliki Golak, 1,495 meters or 4,905 feet). On the northern side, some other panoramic and frequently visited summits are Little Mount Golak (Mali Golak, 1,480 meters or 4,860 feet), Mount Poldanovec (1,298 meters or 4,259 feet), and Pointed Peak (Špičasti vrh 1,128 meters or 3,701 feet), and on the southern side Big Mount Modrasovec (Veliki Modrasovec, 1,355 meters or 4,446 feet), Mount Kucelj (1,237 meters or 4,058 feet), Blue Peak (Sinji vrh, 1,002 meters or 3,287 feet), and Kovk Hill (962 meters or 3,156 feet).

== Natural landmarks ==
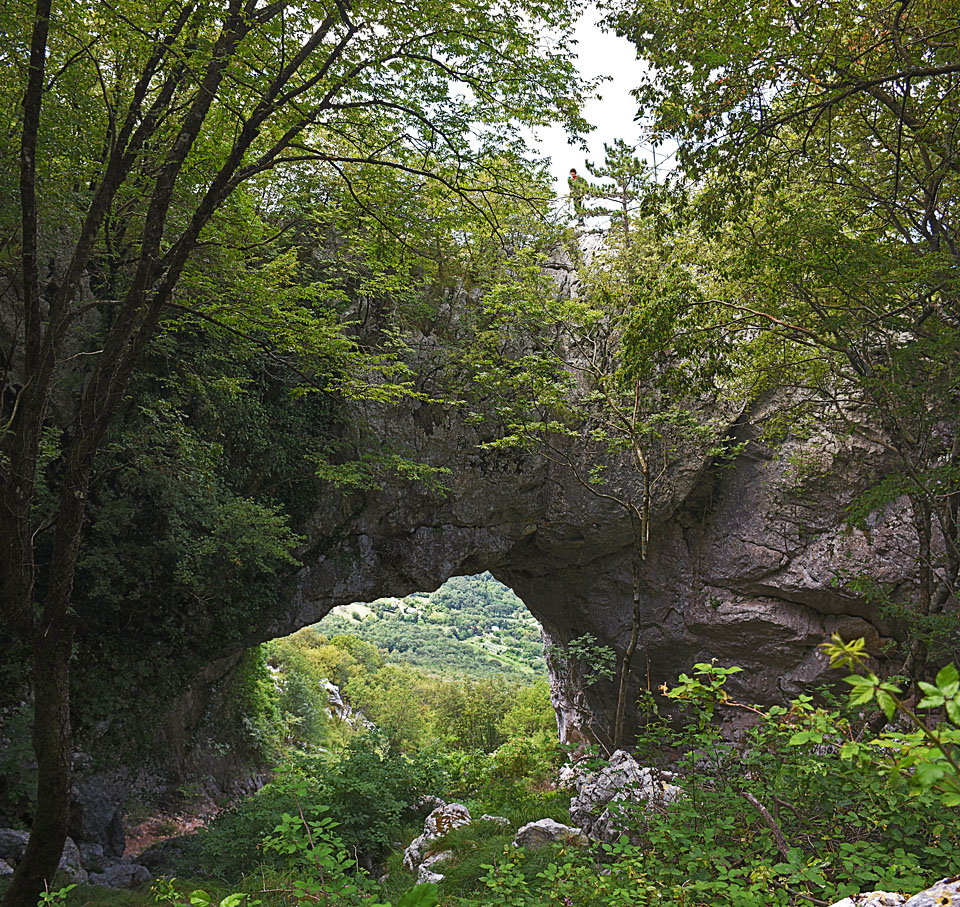
Skozno rock window

- Skozno natural rock window (above Šmihel)
- Otlica natural rock window (above Ajdovščina)
- Hubelj karst spring (above Ajdovščina)
- Vipava springs (near Vipava)
- Lijak karst spring
- Wild Lake (a Vauclusian spring and small lake with a deep unexplored siphon)
- Paradana Cave (a deep cave, with ice that was harvested and sold in the past)

== Climate ==
The climate of the Trnovo Forest Plateau is defined by its elevation and orientation. The Trnovo Forest Plateau lies in a continental temperature zone. It receives an average of 1,881 millimeters (74.1 in) of precipitation per year. Differences in the quantity of precipitation differ little on a monthly basis. The greatest precipitation is in November (293 millimeters or 11.5 inches) and the least in February (135 millimeters or 5.3 inches). The majority of winter precipitation is in the form of snow, especially at higher elevations. The bora wind is a typical weather phenomenon, blowing down from the plateau towards the sea with gusts often exceeding 100 kilometers per hour (62 mph). The bora can cause considerable damage in the area, uprooting trees and tearing the roofs off of houses.

== Water ==
Despite the abundant precipitation, karst plateaus have almost no water. The drainage divide is unclear because of the karst surface. The largest spring is that of the Hubelj River near Ajdovščina.

== Vegetation ==
The Trnovo Forest Plateau is covered by mixed beech and fir forest (Abieti-fagetum dinaricum). The highest vegetation is on Little Mount Golak (1,495 meters or 4,905 feet), which is bare at the summit, below which grow dwarf willow (Salix sp.) and mountain pine (Pinus mugo). Protected flora grows in the rocky crevices, including the Carniolan primrose (Primula carniolica).

The share of forest is 75.5%, but this is increasing because of the afforestation of abandoned farmland. Poor accessibility has resulted in relatively good preservation of the landscape features. The highest peaks are overgrown with mountain pine or grass. Dinaric beech and fir forest grow at elevations between 700 meters (2,300 ft) and 1,200 meters (3,900 ft). At lower elevations this transitions into Dinaric submontane beech forest. There is relatively little shrubland.

== Soil ==
Chromic cambisol and rendzina have developed on Cretaceous and Jurassic limestone and on Triassic dolomite. More acidic soils are found only on limestone with chert. Due to karstification, the depth of regolith is very uneven. The substantial precipitation quickly erodes the soil, and it is also carried away by the bora wind in exposed locations.

== Population ==
The plateau had a population of 4,534 in the 1991 census, and the population density was only 9 per square kilometer (23/sq mi), making the area one of the most sparsely populated in Slovenia. Only the western part is inhabited. The settlements were formed through more recent high-elevation colonization, and the dominant patterns are clustered villages and isolated farms. The age profile of the population is unfavorable.

== Economy ==
In addition to forestry, farming is also an important economic activity. The basic farming activity is animal husbandry, especially raising cattle. The share of the farming population is 14.4%. Tourism is becoming increasingly important: the steep slopes of the plateau attract hikers, and some karst features also attract visitors, especially ice caves and sinkholes because of the vegetation associated with them.
