= Branik Castle =

13th-century Slovenian castle

Coordinates: 45.8512°N 13.7918°E

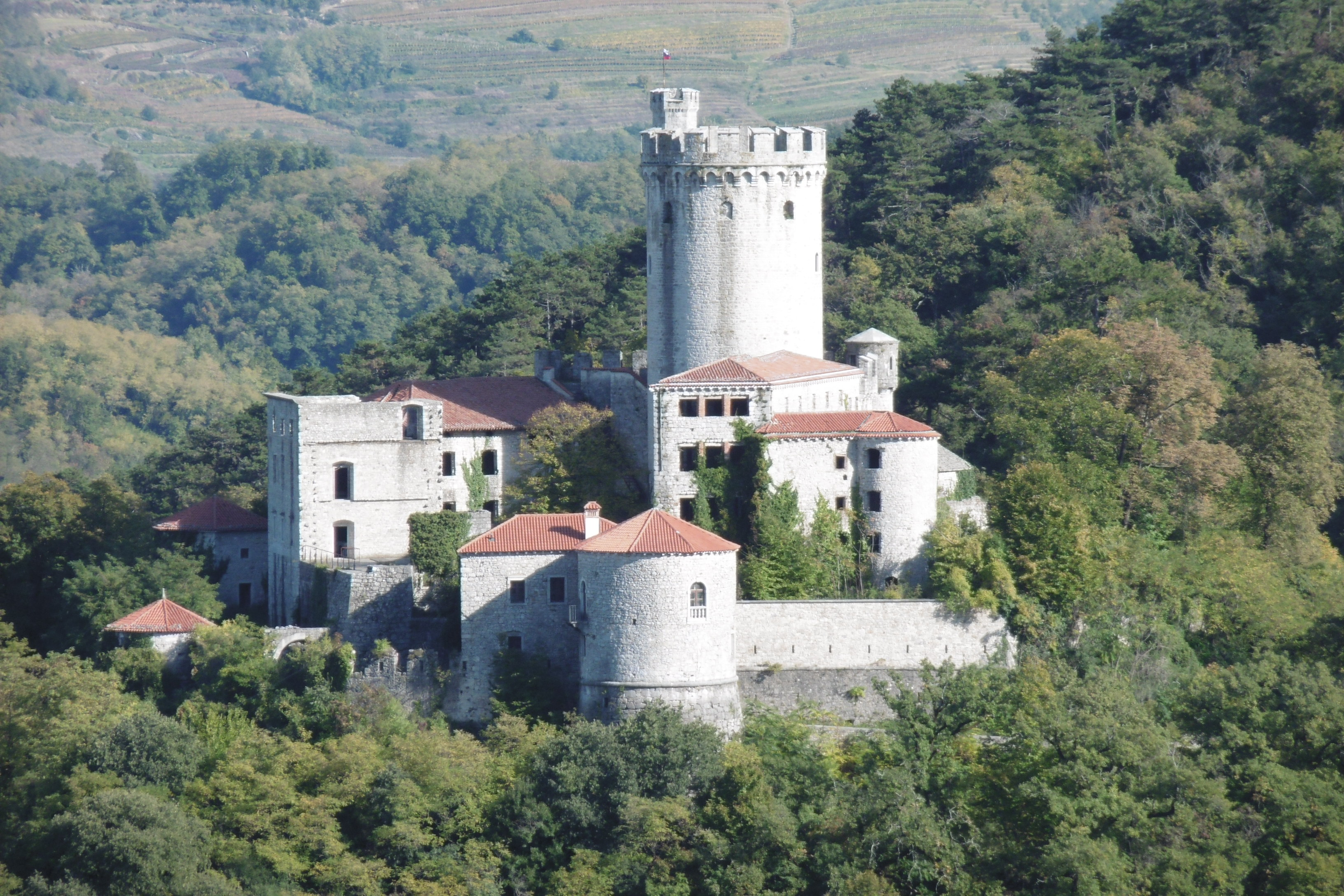
Branik (Rihemberk) Castle viewed from the road to Pedrovo

Branik Castle (Slovene: Grad Branik, pronounced [bɾaˈniːk]), also known as Rihemberk Castle (Grad Rihemberk, pronounced [ˈɾiːxəmbɛɾk]), is a 13th-century castle above the village of Branik, near the city of Nova Gorica in southwestern Slovenia.

== History ==
Fortified settlements have been present on the hill above what is now the village of Branik since prehistoric times; the site was once occupied by a Roman castrum. The date of the founding of the castle is unclear, but the noble house of Rihemberk (Slovene: Rihemberžani) is first recorded in 1230, originating from Riffenstein in Tyrol, now the castle of Reifenstein in Freienfeld, northern Italy. The name Rihemberk derives from the name of the family's former castle, and is a compound of the German words Riffe 'ridge' and Berg 'mountain'. The family received substantial properties in fief from the Counts of Gorizia, including estates in the Vipava Valley, the Karst Plateau, in the outskirts of the town of Gorizia and elsewhere. The Rihemberg male line died out in 1371. In the 14th and 15th centuries the lordship contracted to the immediate surroundings of Rihemberk, a small part of the Vipava Valley, and the Karst Plateau. After the Counts of Gorizia died out in 1500, the castle passed to the Habsburgs. In 1528 both it and the surrounding lands were acquired by the noble house of Lanthieri, who added a residential palacio in 1649. The Lanthieris retained the castle for a full 417 years, until World War II. On the night of 22 July 1944, the Partisans burned and dynamited the castle. All of its furnishings were destroyed. In 1945, the castle was nationalized. Since the 1980s, it has since been gradually restored, though all prewar structures have not yet been fully rebuilt.

In 1999, the castle was declared a cultural monument of national importance.

== Architecture ==
The Romanesque foundations of the castle are still evident in some places. The castle complex is centered on a prominent 13th-century round keep, around which a substantial Baroque residential tract was later developed, all surrounded with Renaissance defensive walls and 16th century corner turrets. The older structures contain some Gothic elements, notably the castle chapel.

The building took its current shape in the 17th/18th centuries, when it was turned into a Baroque residence. Significant remodeling was carried out in the 19th century as well, notably the romantic crenellations of the walls.

A partially preserved walled garden once occupied the south slope below the castle. The design of the entrance gate suggests the garden belongs to the Baroque period of the castle.

== Gallery ==
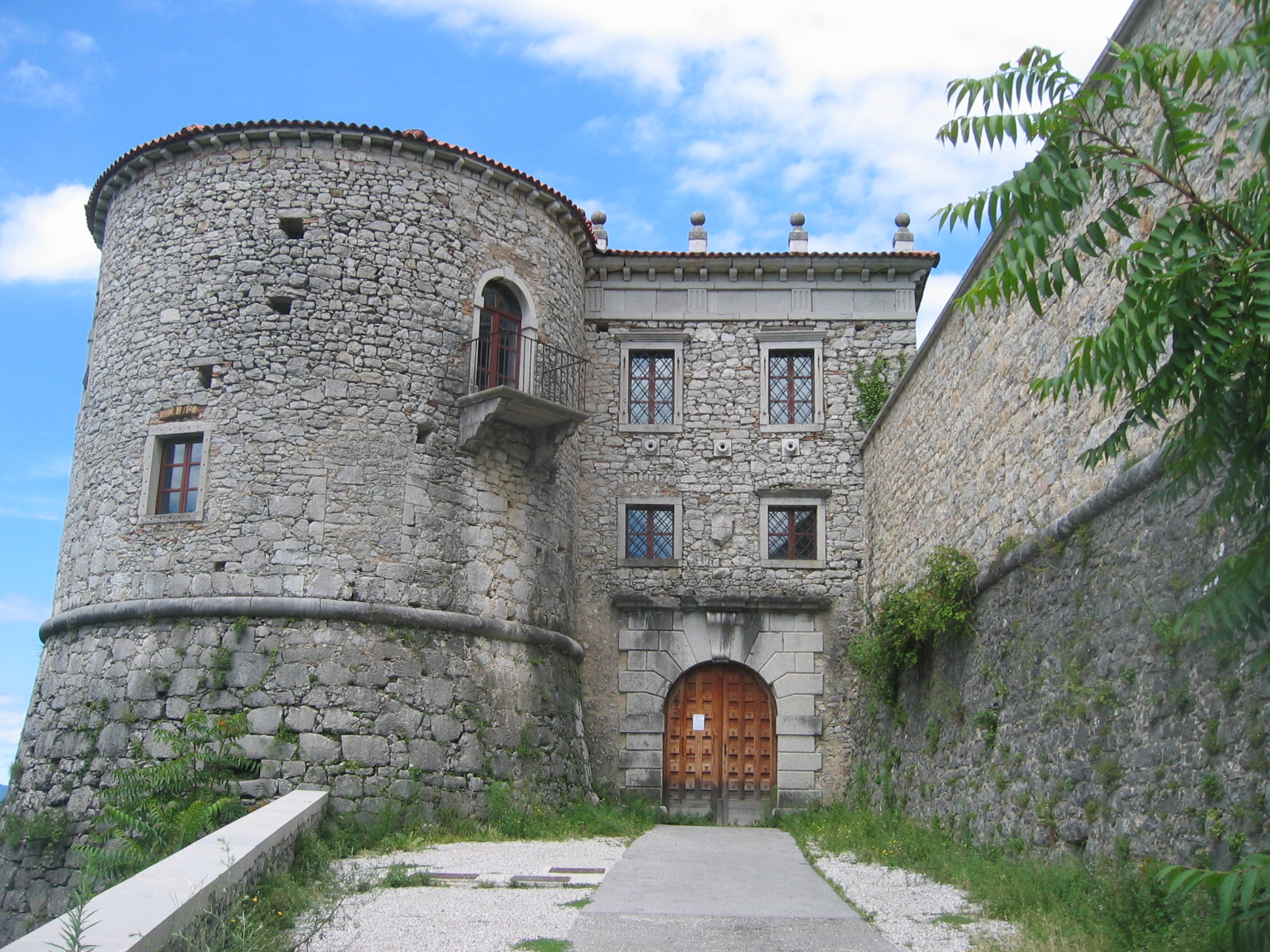
Branik Castle, main gate

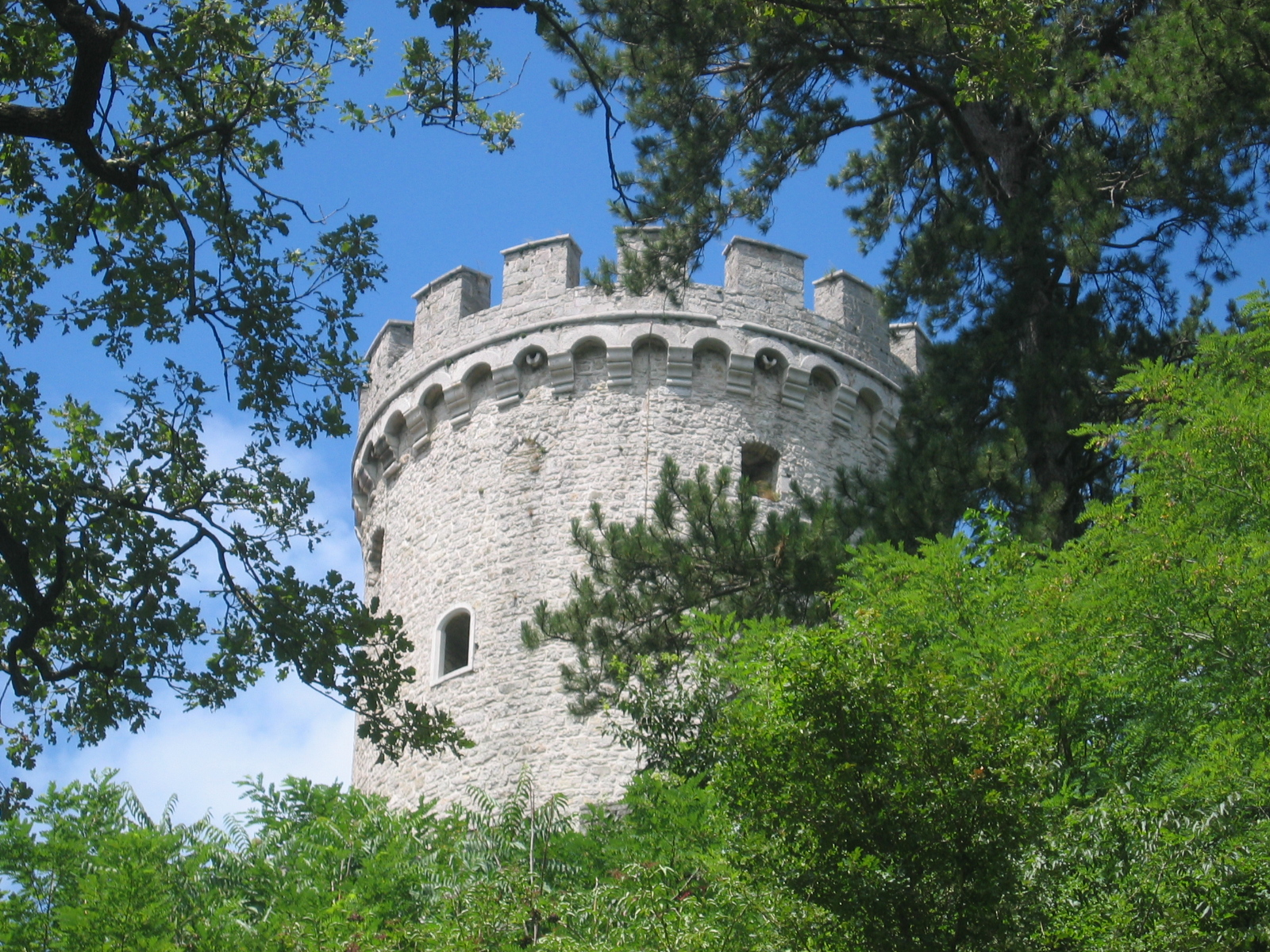
Branik Castle, keep

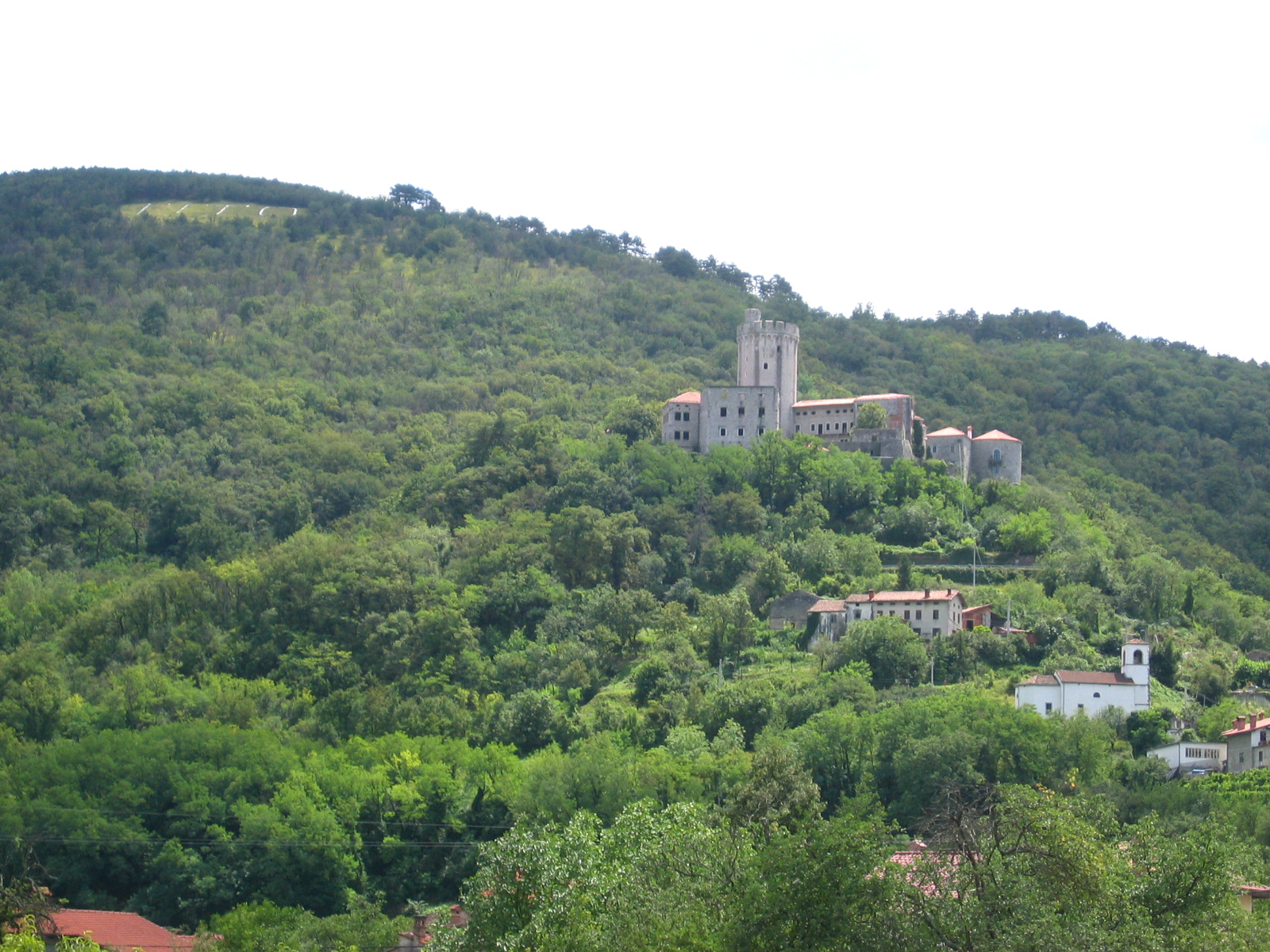
Branik Castle, panorama
