= Reifenstein Castle =

Coordinates: 46°52′41″N 11°26′40″E

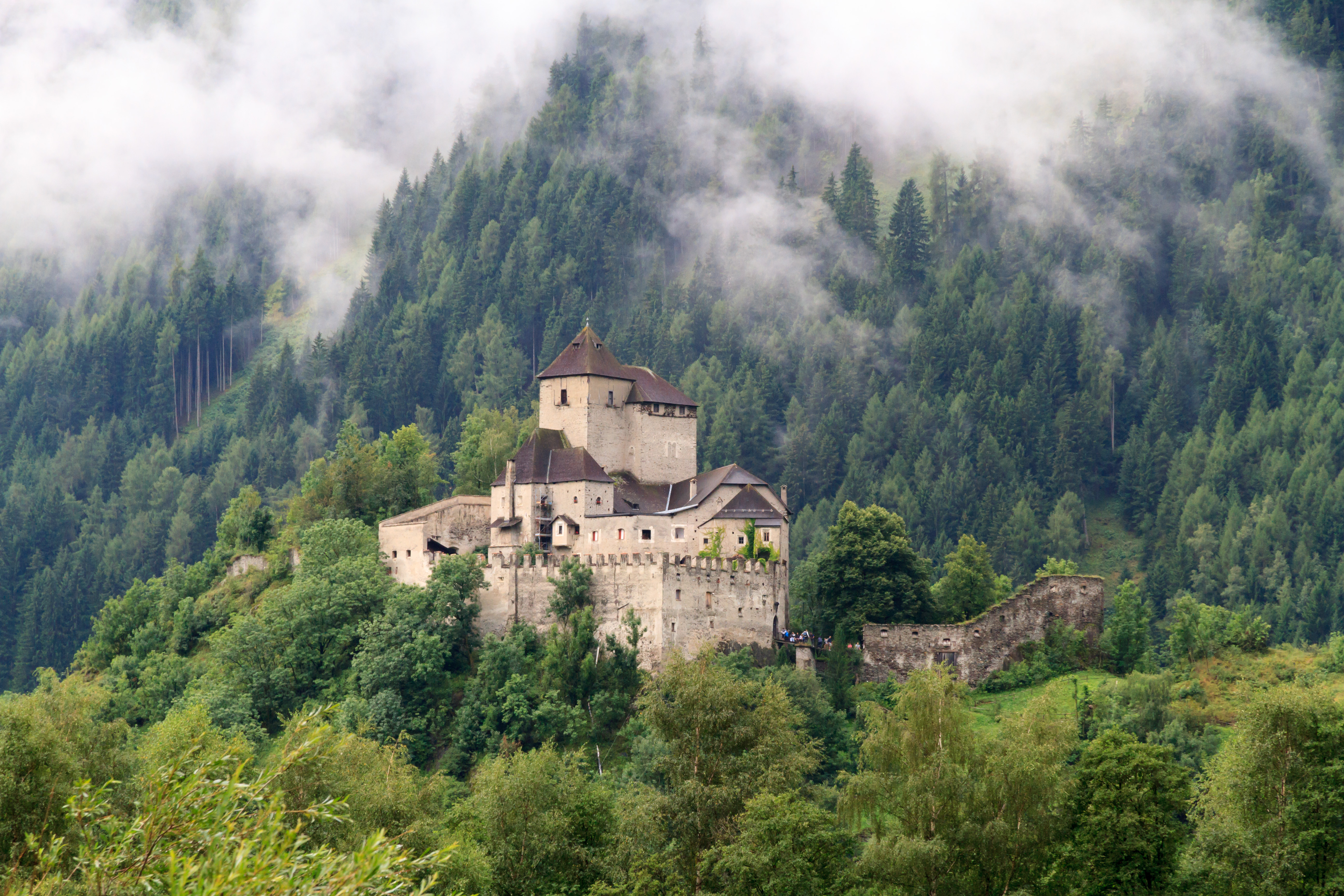
- Reifenstein Castle
- Type: Castle
- Location: Freienfeld, near Sterzing, in South Tyrol northern Italy
- Built: 12th century

Reifenstein Castle (German: Burg Reifenstein, Italian: Castel Tasso) is a castle in Freienfeld, near Sterzing, in South Tyrol (northern Italy). It is located near a dried marsh, in the valley of the Eisack.

== History ==
The castle is mentioned for the first time in the 12th century, and was modified in the 14th century. It is a property of the Thurn und Taxis counts, who have remained its owners until the present. It is famous for the decorated "Green Hall" with Gothic paintings and a woodcarved chapel-door, the stubes and the collection of armor. The castle also contains an original kitchen, bathroom and medieval sleeping bunks.

== See also ==
- Branik (Rihemberk) Castle, Slovenia
- List of castles in South Tyrol
