= Nevin Birsa =

Nevin Birsa may refer to:

- Birsa Munda (1875–1900), Indian independence movement leader
- Nevin Birsa (Slovene poet) (1947–2003), Slovene poet
