= Tjaša Iris =

Slovenian-born Mauritius-based visual artist (born 1968)

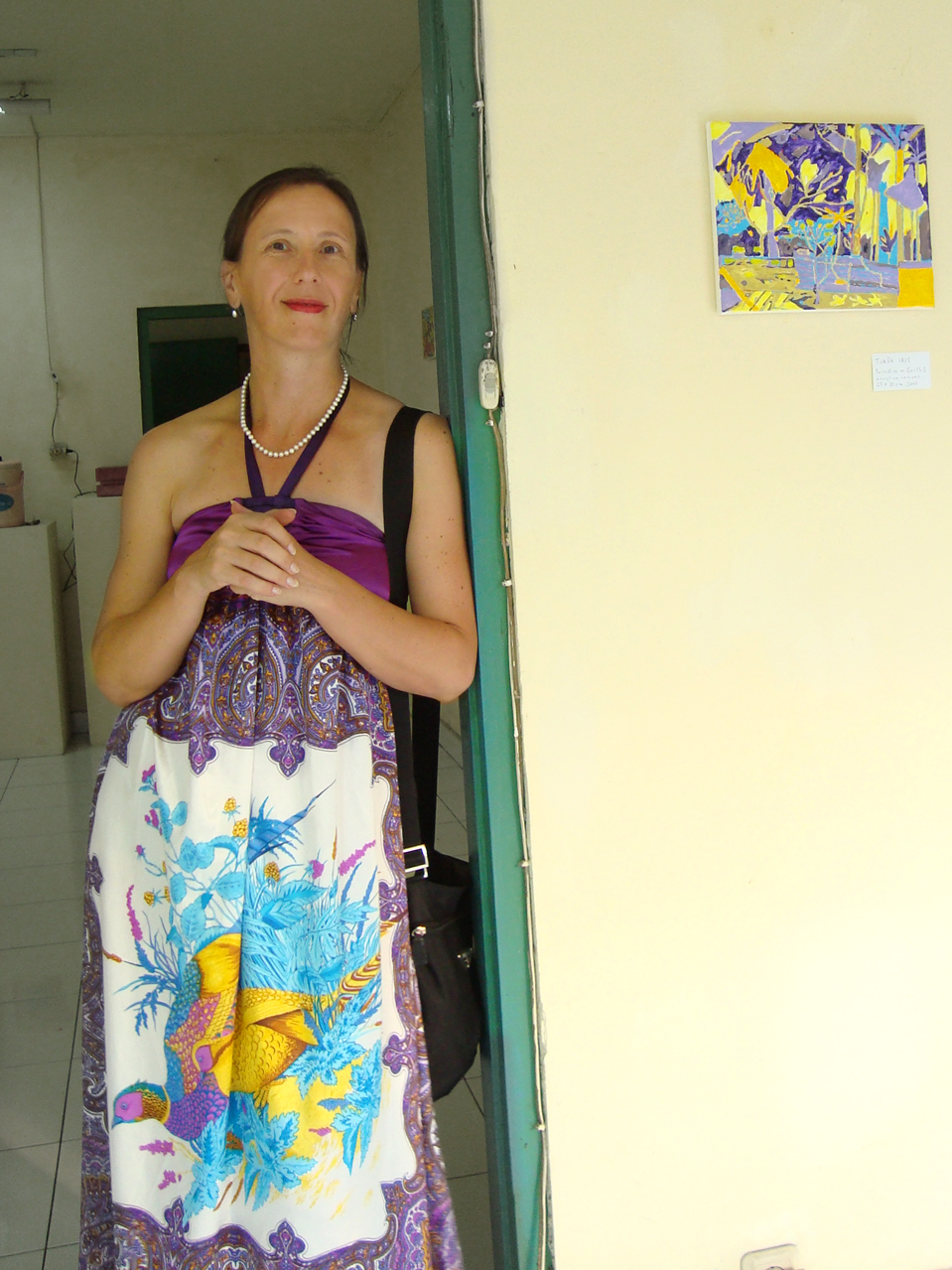
- Born: Tjaša Demšar; 5 October 1968 (age 58) Kranj, Slovenia
- Areas: Painter, Photographer, NFT Artist, Entrepreneur

Tjaša Iris is a Slovenian-born artist, known for her digitally manipulated photographs and large paintings painted with bright colors, vivid atmospheres of gardens with lush vegetation and bright light. Color is the main concern in her painting and her photographs, exploring its emotional and expressive qualities. She is also one of the pioneers of Slovenian NFT Art, as well as one of Slovenian leading NFT artists.

== Early life ==
After a year of studying International Relations – Political Science at the University of Ljubljana, Slovenia, she moved to Florence, Italy, at the age of 18 which meant a new birth for her. She started to study photography and painting at a private art school: International School of Fine Art Fortman Studios, in Via Fiesolana 34r, historically the first art school in Italy that was offering study of photography as an art form, where she studied photography and painting and gained a diploma in 1991. She continued her study of photography at Staffordhaire Polytechnic for a semester in Stoke-on-Trent. Later she continued her studies at Audio-Visual Department at Academie Minerva in Groningen, The Netherlands, where she earned her M.A. in Fine Arts (painting) in 1995.

== Career ==
In 1994 she moved to Treviso, Italy (near Venice) where she got herself her first studio, a 3.5 × 3.5 m room in an abandoned factory where specially in year 1996 she produced a huge amount of very big size paintings. In December 1997 she moved to Venice for seven years. Where besides painting at her home, a primo piano nobile Venetian Palace apartment with painted ceilings at San Marco 2569 she started holding painting workshops in Tuscany, Provence, Puglia and Slovenia. She also worked at Slovenian Gallery and Slovenian Pavilion at The Venice Biennale – Galleria A+A.

She spent a winter in Paris at Cite' Internationale des Arts an international artist's residency. On and off two years in Lake Tahoe Area of the Sierra Mountains in California, until she bought a villa in the Branik village, Pre-Coastal Wine Country of Slovenia in 2004. Located ten min from Italian border about an hour East from Ljubljana and West from Venice. In the years 2004–2010 she continued working winters at Cite International des Arts in Paris while one winter she spent in Morocco, studying the colors there.

During the years 1996–2011 she dedicated much of her time to her painting workshops. She had workshop participants from all six continents, many of them became her collectors and art patrons. With this marketing of her work, she was able to work around the usual gallery world at the same time placing paintings into private collections on all six continents.

At Villa Flora her painting went into a full swing. In 2008 she was ready for a higher level of solo exhibitions that later took place in Koper, Slovenia, Singapore, Ubud, Bali, Indonesia, Kuala Lumpur, Chiang Mai and Bangkok Thailand.

Due to her character of always being attracted by the places where the things are moving, she visited Hong Kong in 2009, Singapore and surrounding countries in 2010, and in 2012.

In November 2013 she had her first bigger solo museum show at Chiang Mai CMU Art Museum. The exhibition later moved to Bangkok, to Jamjuree Art Gallery, an Art Museum of Chulalongkorn University in Bangkok was opened until 16 January 2014.

During 2013 and 2014 she created over 200 limited edition prints. In 2014 three books were published with Blurb, curated by writer Angela Rosental. Tjaša Iris: Gardens of Eden, 170 Limited Edition Prints of 35. Tjaša Iris: Joy of Nature, Special Editions of 5. Tjaša Iris: Paradise from a New Dimension, Special Editions of 5.

From 2011 until 2015 she made Chiang Mai, Thailand her primary home.

In 2015 – 2018 she lived a nomadic life traveling between Thailand, Cambodia, Malaysia and Singapore. As a result of it she did more photography than painting. In May 2017 she gathered all her works of eight years and published a book of her photography from years 2009 – 2017 with the title: "Tjaša Iris – 8 Winters in South East Asia – A European Under the Tropics", available at Amazon.com.

In August 2017 she had a solo exhibition at BACC Bangkok Arts & Culture Center, one of the biggest art institutions/museum in South East Asia visited by over 1 million people per year, so about 100 000 saw her exhibition of paintings and photographs which was very well accepted.

In March 2020 she got stranded in Koh Phangan Island in Thailand, where she created an extensive series of over 500 digitally manipulated photographs titled: SEA GARDEN SERIES – Stranded on a Peaceful Island. The series was in creation until mid 2023.

In 2024 – 2025 she spent 9 months in Southern India at Isha Foundation in Coimbator and as artist in residence at Gowry Art Institute in Kallar, Kerala. During this time she created a photography series called: THE BLACK SANDS OF KERALA. She also created a documentary with SaveSoil with the title: "Tjaša Iris, Stranded in Koh Phangan Island During Covid", that is including 150 of her works created on the island as well as her story about raising an asian koel bird and growing hundreds of papaya trees.

== Work ==
Tjaša Iris is considered an exceptional colorist. While in her earlier work there were many landscapes and less gardens, in her work of the last ten years we see mostly gardens with lush vegetation. She dedicates most of her exhibitions to these themes. Her earlier work always had origins in Southern Europe, the Mediterranean part of Europe. Her work of the last three years depict beautiful flowers and lush tropical gardens in bright, vivid, lush colors. Her paintings are full of a powerful unique energy. Her stylistic roots are in Expressionism, a modernist movement in Europe from the beginning of the last century. The movement's typical trait was to present the world solely from a subjective perspective, distorting it radically for emotional effect in order to evoke moods or ideas. Expressionist artists sought to express meaning or emotional experience rather than physical reality. Her work is a continuation of these concerns.

Color, specifically bright colors combined with strong light, is the central focus of her paintings, through which she explores emotional and expressive qualities using contrasting light, value, and temperature.

An avid traveler, she documents her locations through compositions that range from descriptive to abstract. Her landscape and botanical subjects frequently feature tropical vegetation and architectural elements inspired by her travels across Southeast Asia and Europe. Specific subjects include the Singapore Botanic Gardens, the Bhubing Palace Gardens in Chiang Mai, and botanical sites in Bali, Kuala Lumpur, and the Miramare Castle gardens near Trieste, Italy—located near her studio in Branik, Slovenia. Many of her works can be seen on SAATCHI ART.

Her artistic practice is also informed by concepts in quantum physics, optics, and wave-particle behavior, specifically exploring how color frequencies and light waves interact with visual perception. Tjaša Iris continues her exploration of color while responding to the atmosphere of the contemporary world. Her paintings on paper and canvas evoke the flatness of a computer screen, while her large-scale works on jute introduce an additional dimension. As a representative of the Internet generation, she creates dense, complex compositions that reflect the accelerated pace and visual intensity of the information age.

Her photographs and paintings have been described as a "dream world of happy atmospheres, strong light and uplifting lush colors". In an era of economic recession, some have called her the "anti-depressionist artist" due to the energy her paintings emanate.

== Early paintings 1990s ==
These are paintings of landscapes and gardens she painted mostly in Italy, Slovenia and Croatia. these are more immediate works than the paintings from her later period. The brush strokes are big, fast, very loose and fresh, and the colors are very bright.

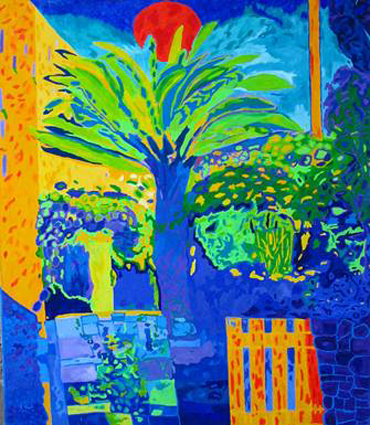
Tjaša Iris, Palma, acryl on canvas, 150 x 130 cm, 1996

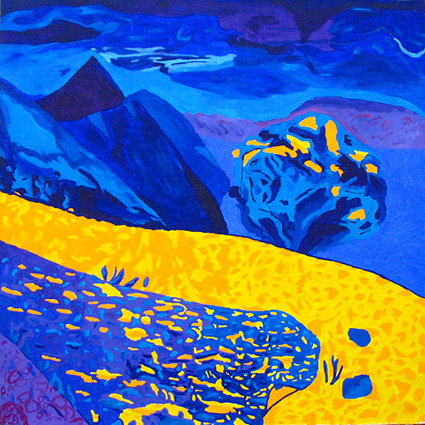
Tjaša Iris, Road to Beli, acryl on canvas, 100 x 100 cm, 1996

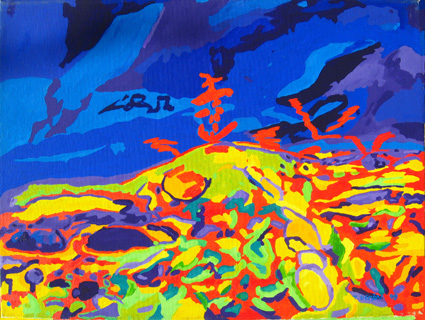
Tjaša Iris, cres, acryl on canvas, 40 x 60 cm, 1997

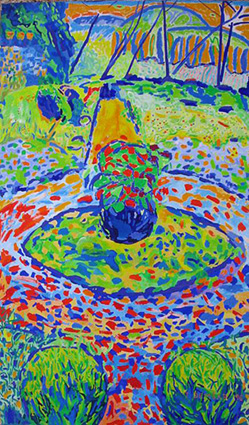
Tjaša Iris, Uzzano, acryl on canvas, 150 x 90 cm, 1997

== European Paintings 2005–2011 ==
From this period on she dedicates herself to mostly paint gardens with lush vegetation. During her stays at Villa Flora in Slovenia she spends much time painting in the nearby Miramare Castle gardens at Riviera di Trieste (Alberi, Gardener's House). She is as well constantly travelling to Publia, Southern Italy from where is originating the painting Pezze. To Capri and Amalfi coast (Capri, Palme e Vasi, Entrance).

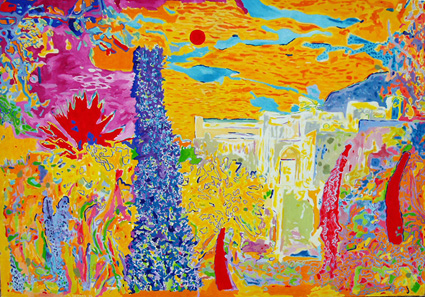
Tjaša Iris, Capri, acryl on canvas, 90 x 120 cm, 2005

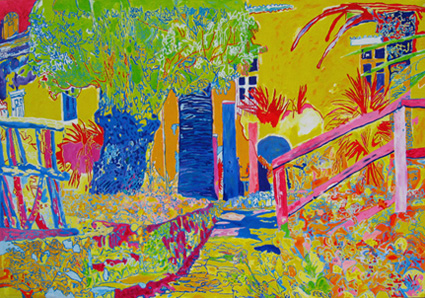
Tjaša Iris, A Path in the Garden, acryl on canvas, 90 x 120 cm, 2007

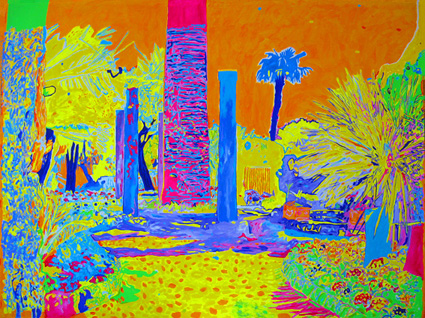
Tjaša Iris, Palma Blu, acryl on canvas, 90 x 120 cm, 2008

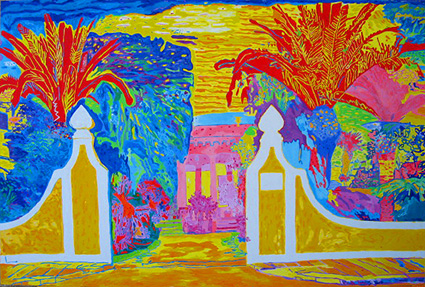
Tjaša Iris, Pezze, acryl on canvas, 100 x 150 cm, 2007

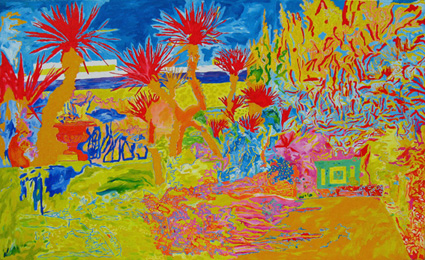
Tjaša Iris, Alberi, Palme e Vasi, 90 x 145 cm, 2007

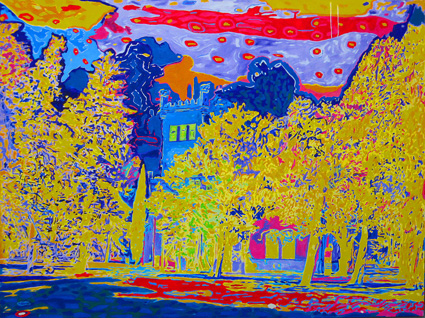
Tjaša Iris, Alberi, acryl on canvas, 90 x 120 cm, 2009

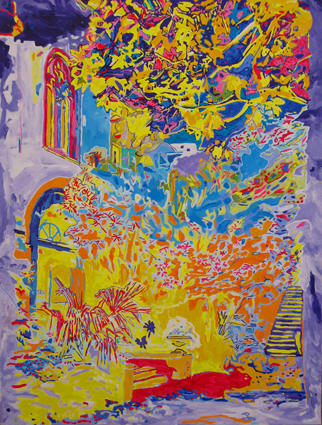
Tjaša Iris, Casa del Giardiniere, acryl on canvas, 120 x 90 cm, 2008

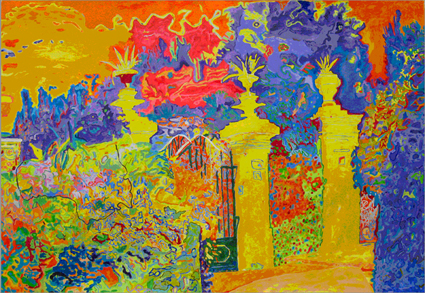
Tjaša Iris, Entrance, acryl on canvas, 100 x 150 cm, 2005-2011

== Asian Paintings 2010–2023 ==
A series of paintings with a focus on the atmosphere. They are described as "from a new dimension". The paintings are from her favorite painting locations in Asia, including but not limited to, Botanical Gardens in Singapore, Bali, Thai King's gardens in Chiang mai, Thailand and the gardens of Hong Kong.

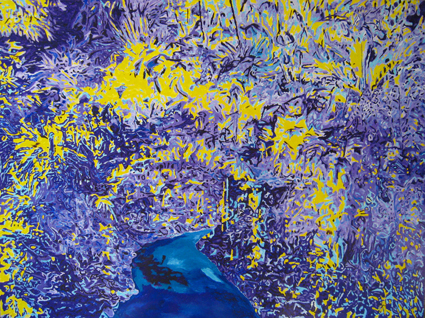
Tjaša Iris, Path in the Garden, acryl on jute, 120 x 160 cm, 2010

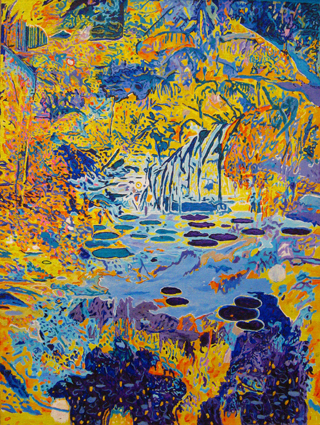
Tjaša Iris, Sun in the Garden, 120 x 90 cm, acryl on jute canvass, 2010

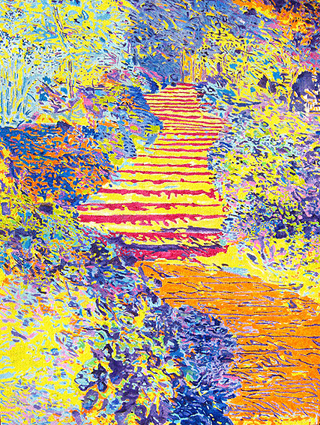
Tjaša Iris, Sunny Stairs and Flowers, acrylic on jutte, 120 x 90 cm, 2011

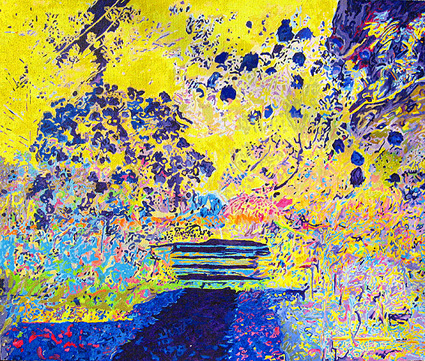
Tjaša Iris, Sunny Garden, acryl on canvas, 90 x 120 cm, 2011

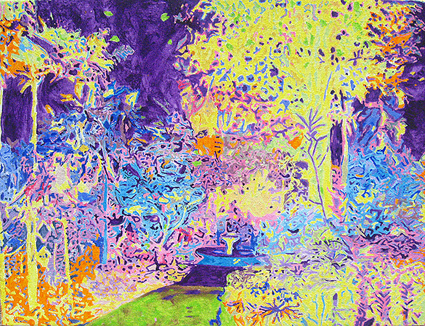
Tjaša Iris, magic Fountain, acryl on canvas, 90 x 120 cm, 2012

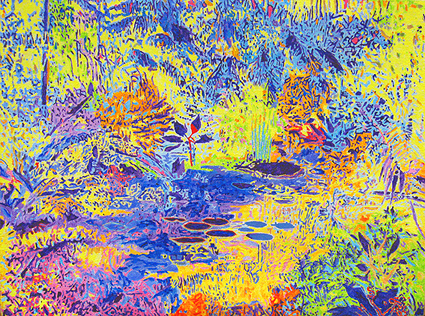
Tjaša Iris, Magic Waters, acryl on canvas, 90 x 120 cm, 2012

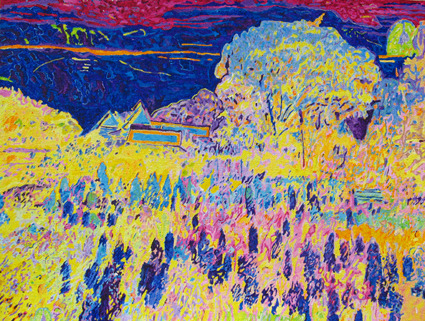
Tjaša Iris, Royal Beauty, acryl on jute, 90 x 120 cm, 2013

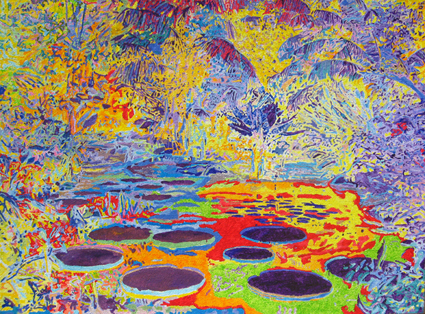
Tjaša Iris, The Joy of Nature, acryl on jute, 90 x 120 cm, 2013

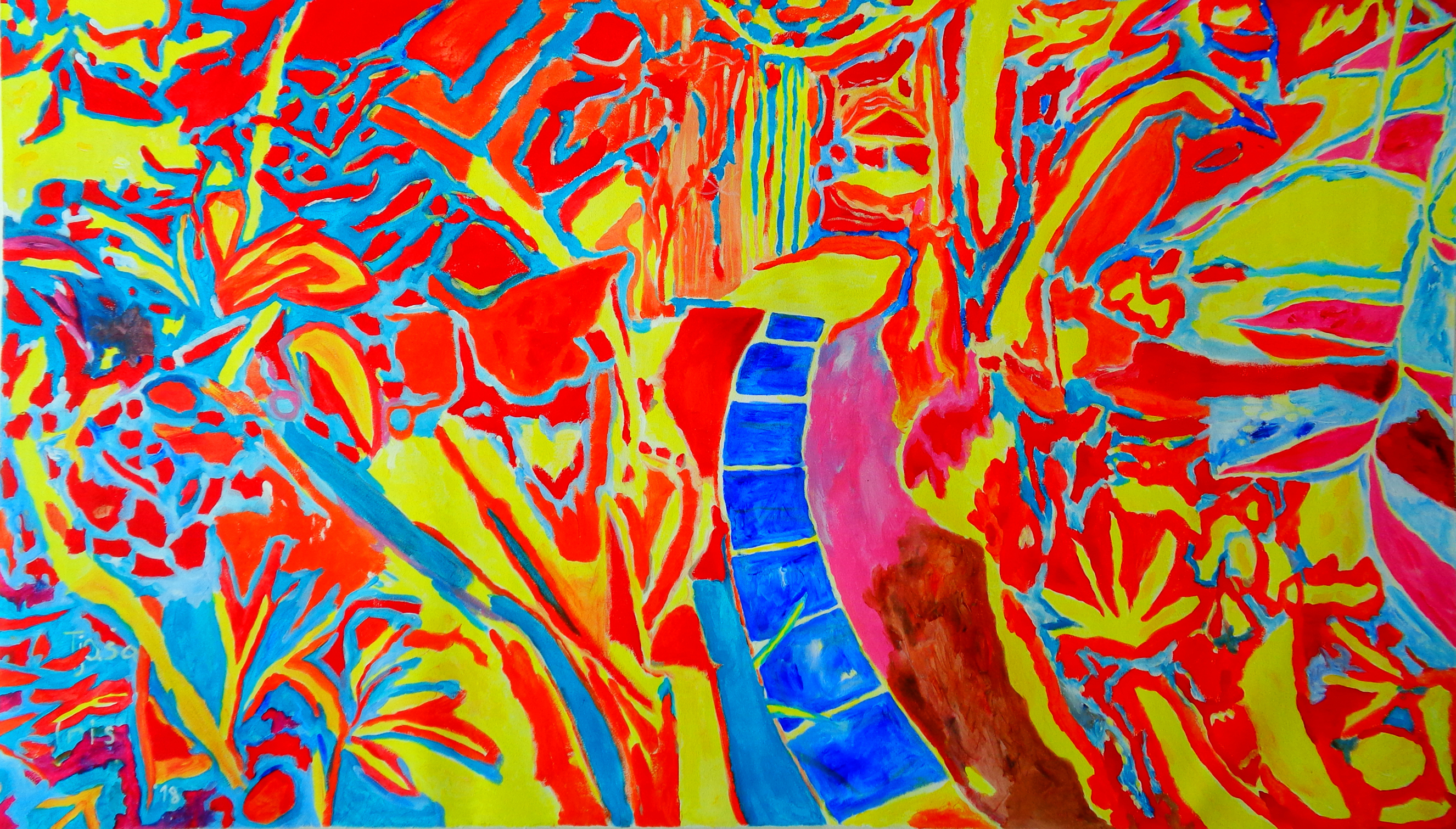
Tjasa Iris, Paradise Path in the Garden, acrylic on canvas, 120 x 210cm, 2018

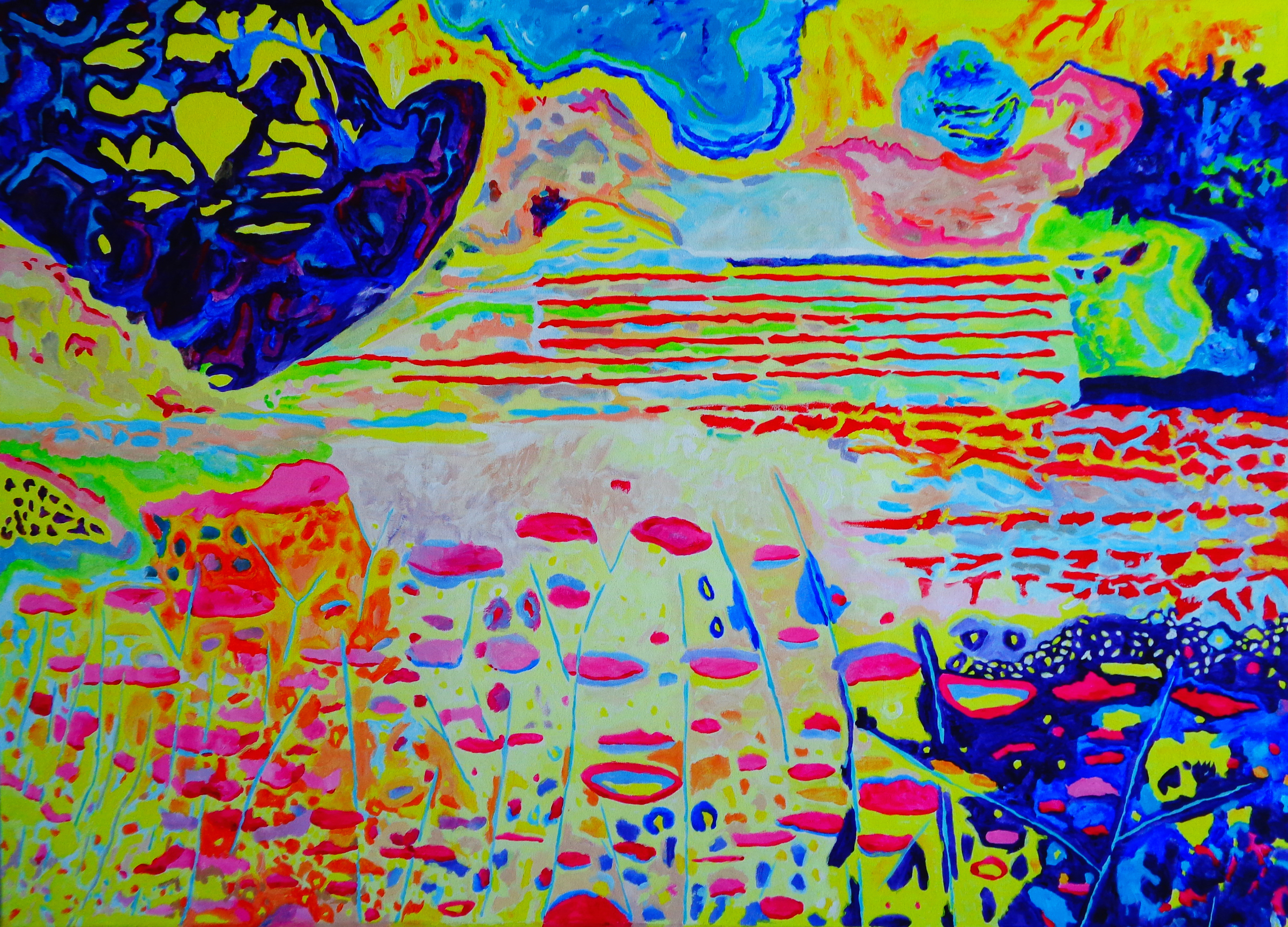
Tjaša Iris , 'Flowers at Night', acrylic on canvas, 120 x 160 cm, 2018

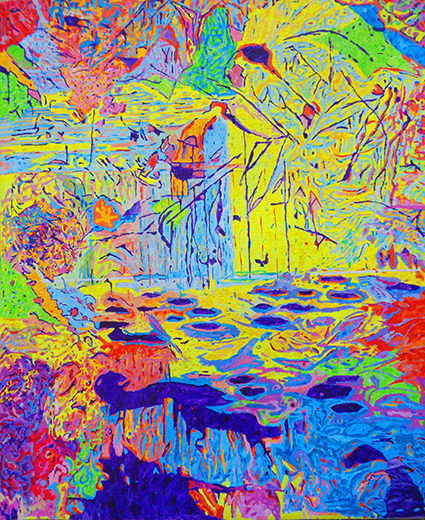
Tjasa Iris, Tropical Landscape, acryl on jute, 130 x 90 cm, 2013 - 2023

== Asian Photographs 2020–2023 ==
In September of 2015, Tjasa Iris left Thailand for an 8 months travelling in Cambodia. That marked the beginning of her 3 years long Nomadic Period. As she did not have a painting studio, she gave herself to photography. Which resulted in a series she named: Garden Series. After Cambodia, Tjasa continued her nomadic life in Malaysia, which resulted in her Garden Series created mostly at Botanical gardens in Kuala Lumpur and Penang. In 2020 she got stranded in Koh Phangan island in Thailand during COVID, where she created her Sea Gardens Series 2020 – 2023.

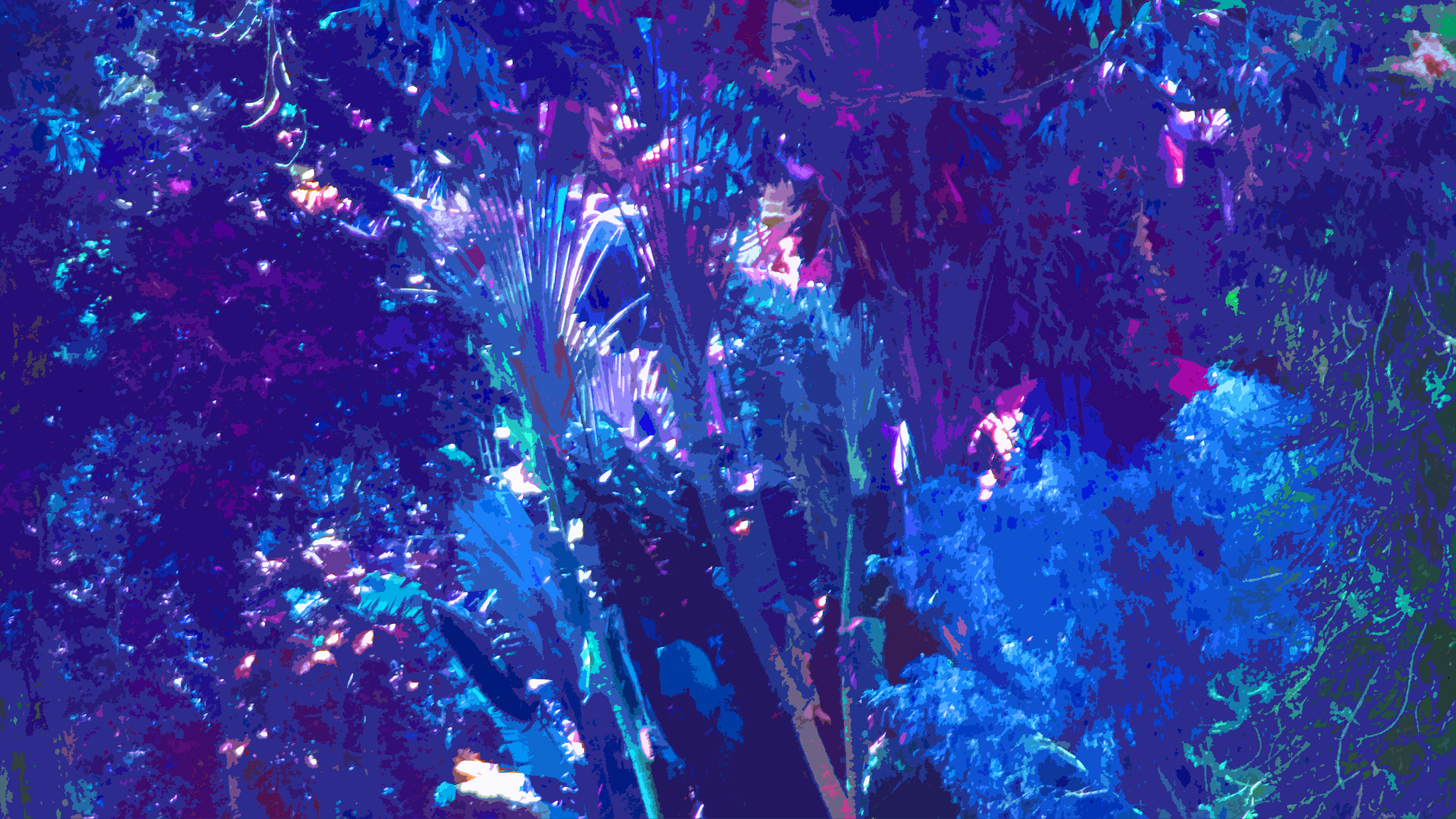
Tjasa Iris, Blue Jungle, 160 x 90 cm, manipulated photograph, 2016

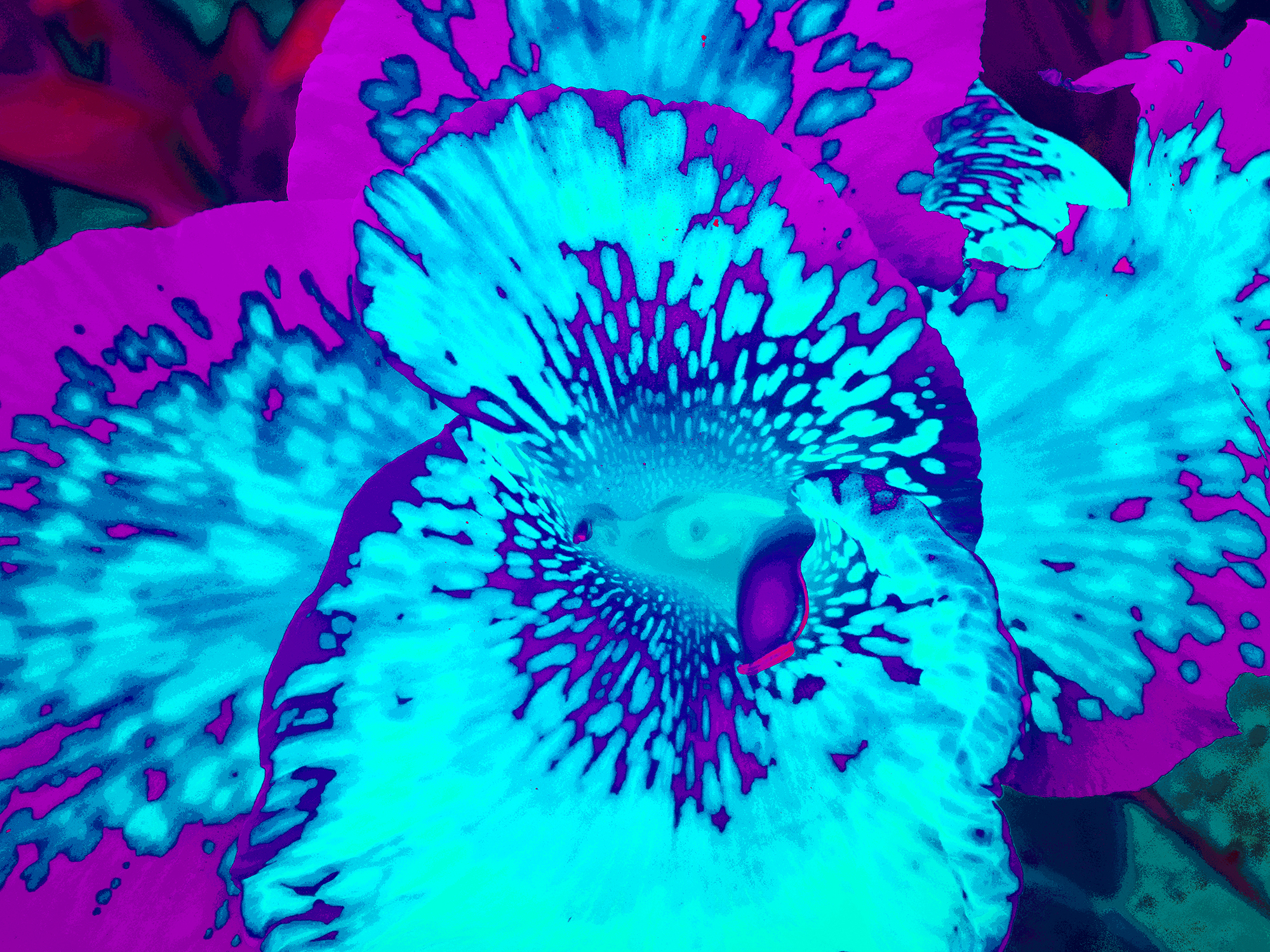
Tjasa Iris, THE EYE, blue, manipulated photograph, 120 x 160 cm, 2016

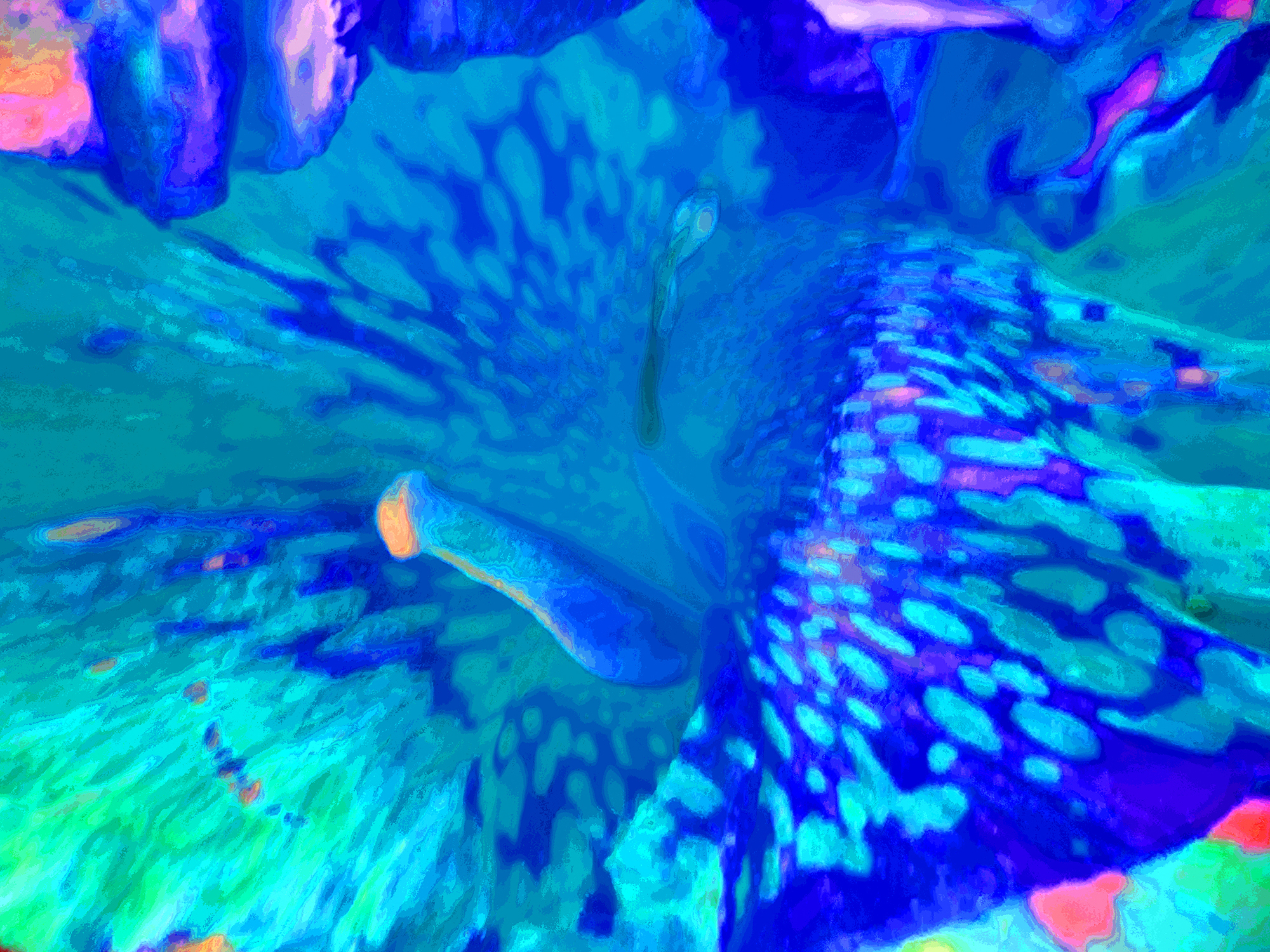
Tjasa Iris, The Valley of Flower, 120 x 160 cm, manipulated photograph, 2016

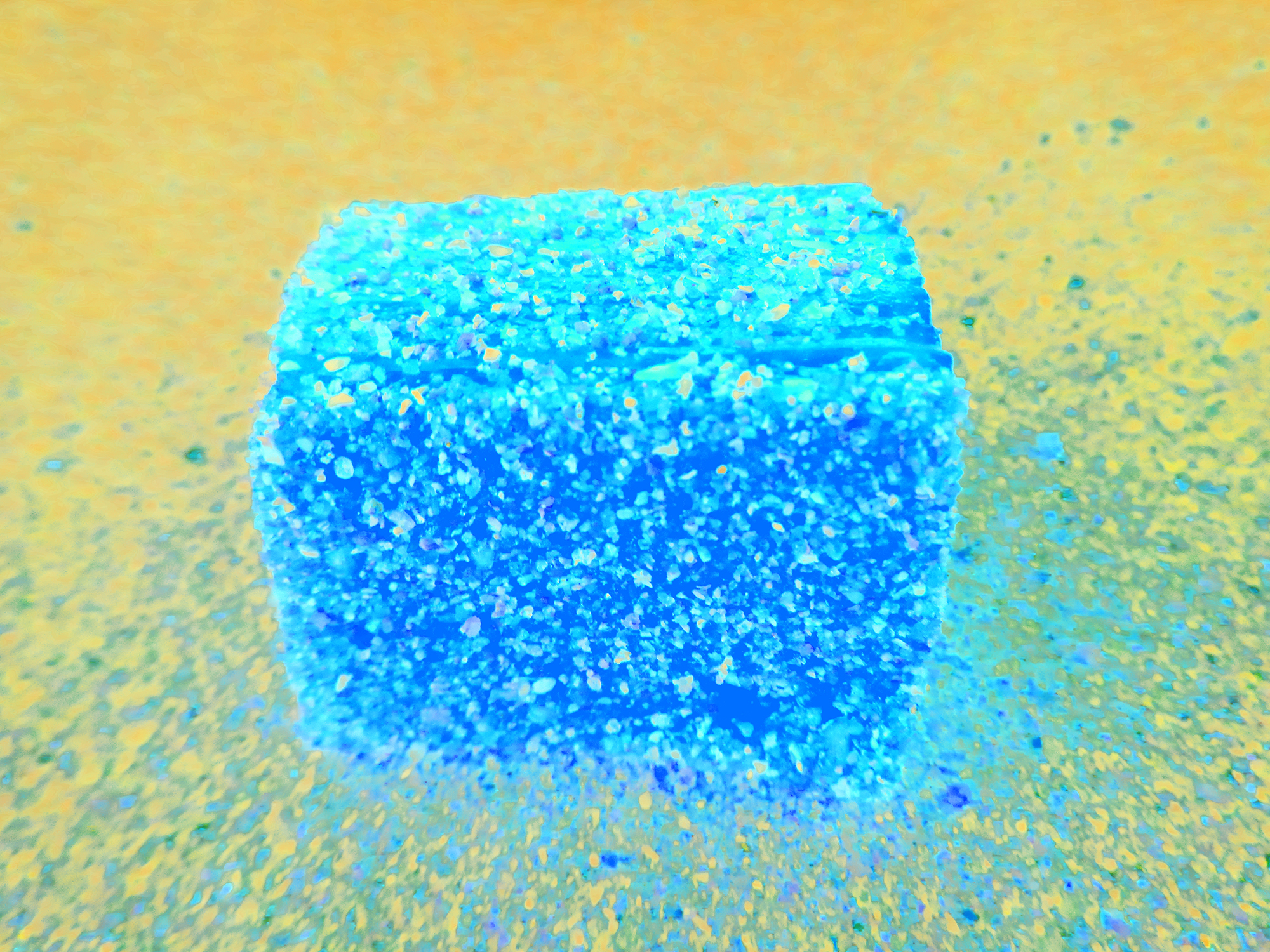
Tjasa Iris, CANOM, light blue, 120 x 160 cm, manipulated photograph 2023

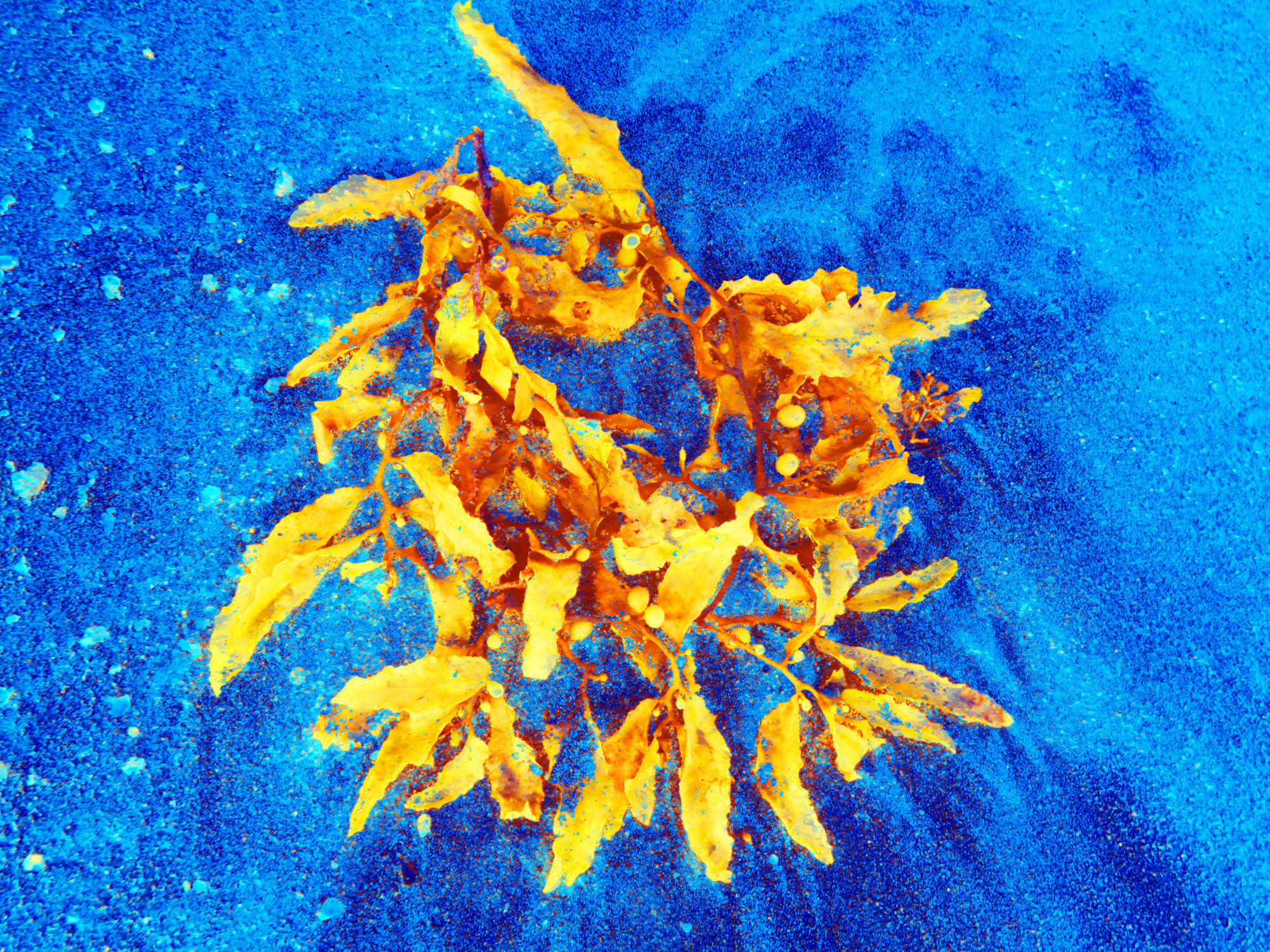
Tjasa Iris, Grass Falling from the Night Sky, 120 x 160 cm, manipulated photograph, 2023

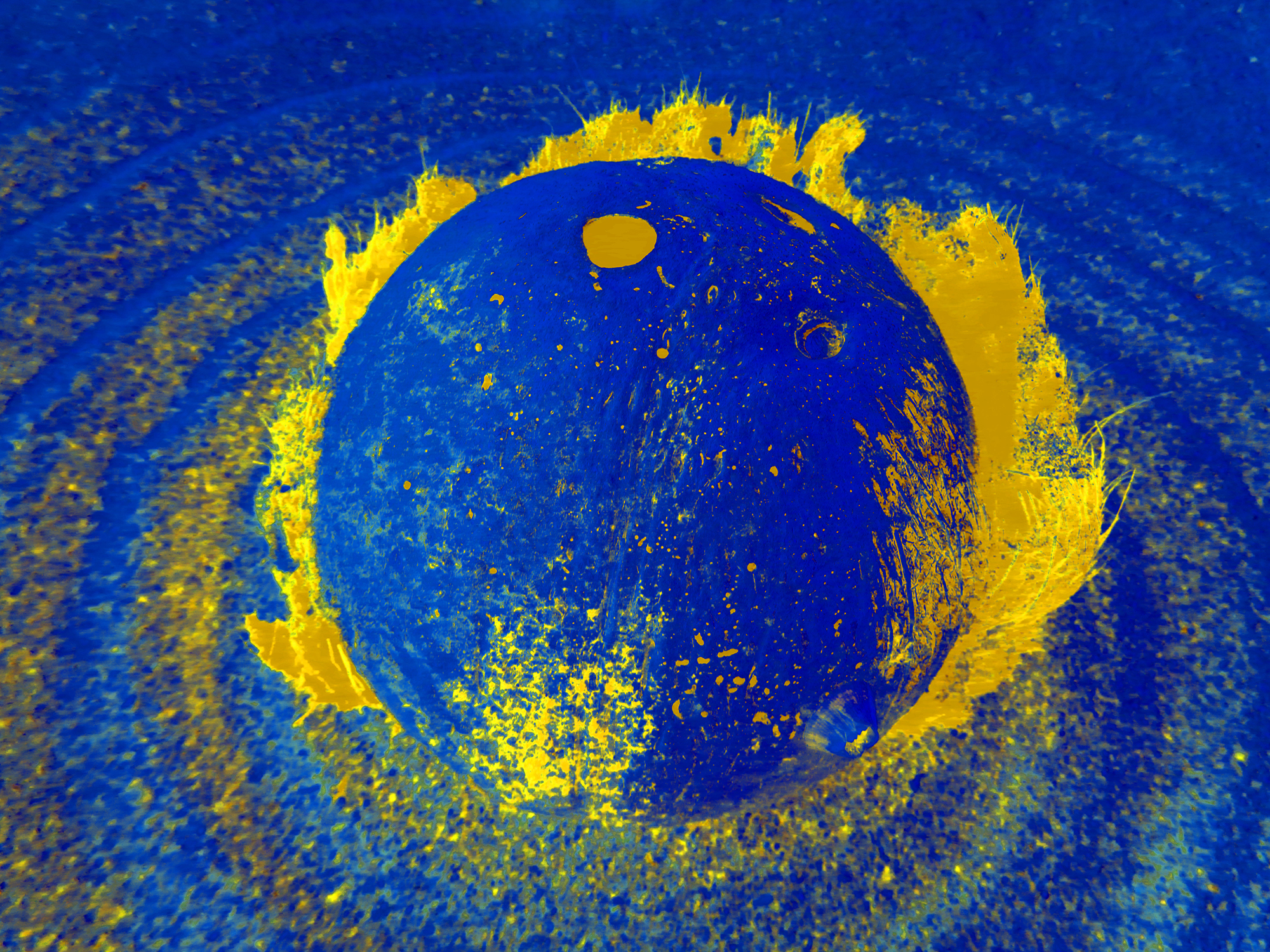
Tjasa Iris, Hollow Moon, dark blue-yellow, 120 x 160 cm manipulated photograph, 2023

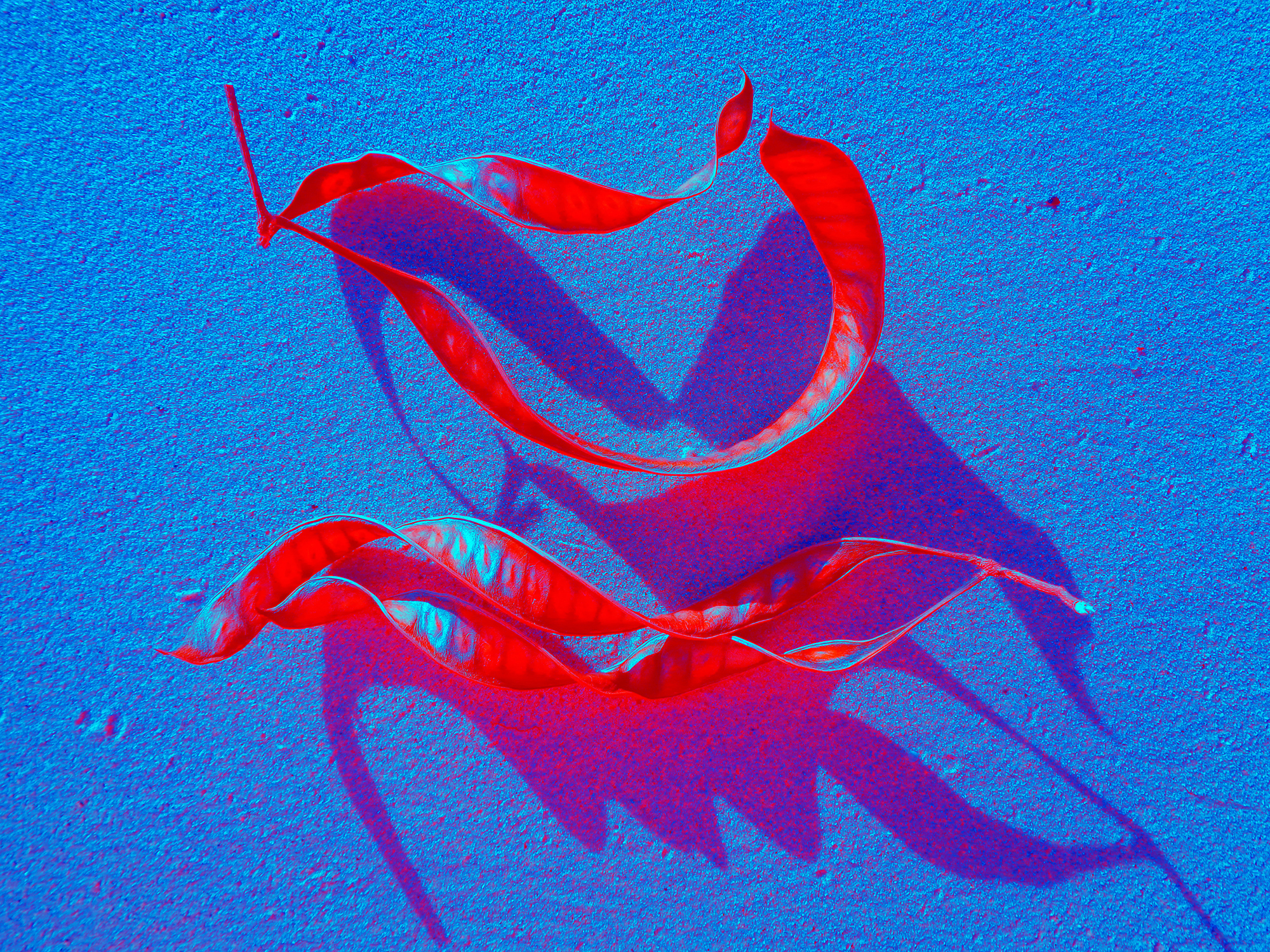
Tjasa Iris, Kaligraphy, 120 x 160 cm, manipulated photograph, 2023

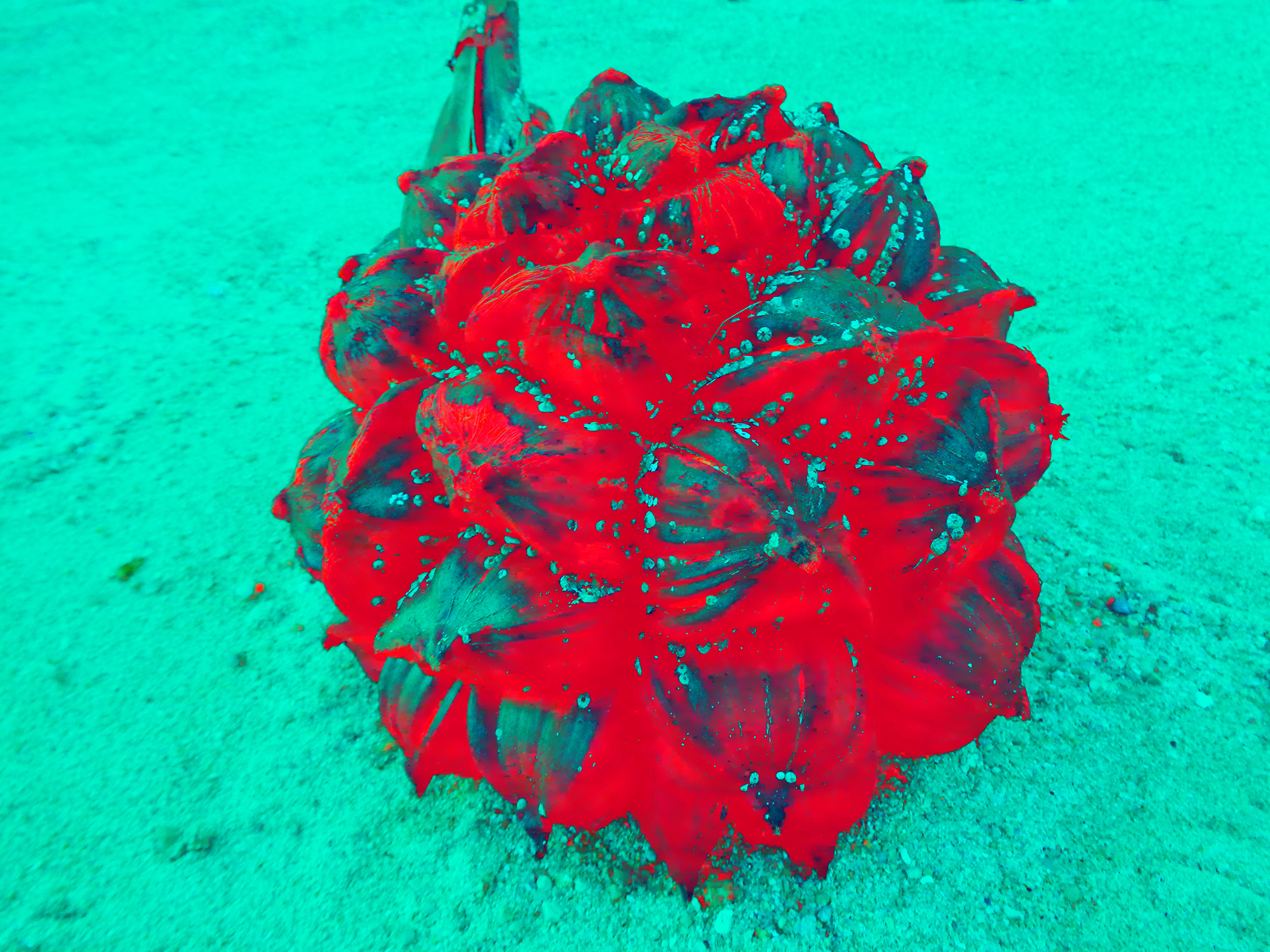
Tjasa Iris, Nuts, 120 x 160 cm, manipulated photograph, 2023

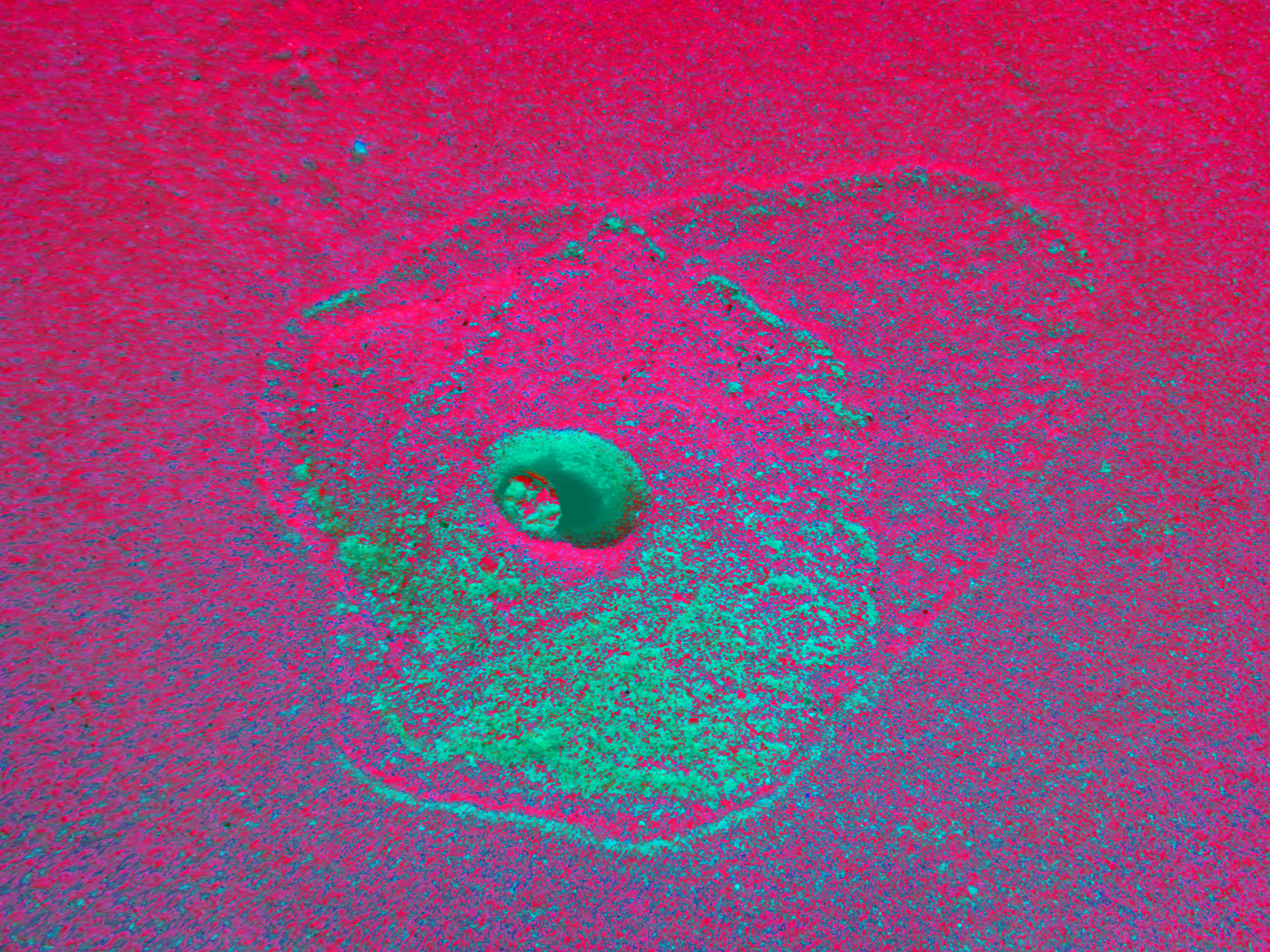
Tjasa Iris, Alien Planet, red-magenta-green, 120 x 160 cm, manipulated photograph, 2023

== Exhibitions ==
=== Solo ===
(* indicates a publication)

- 2019 – 2020 HONG KONG, CHINA, 9 Monsoons in Southeast Asia, La Fenice Art Gallery
- 2018 BANGKOK, THAILAND Austrian Embassy, "Day & Night", 28 March – 25 July. Facebook
- 2017 BANGKOK, THAILAND, "Gardens of Eden – Paintings from a New Dimension" at BACC Bangkok Art & Culture Center, 3–27 August.TJAŠA IRIS, Gardens of Eden – Paintings from a New Dimension At BACC / 3–27 August 2017
- 2014 – 2015 CHIANG MAI, THAILAND, "Gardens of Eden" at 137 Pillar House Art Gallery, 14 December 2014 – 15 March 2015.
- 2013 BANGKOK, THAILAND, "Gardens of Eden" at Jamjuree (State) Art Gallery, an Art Museum of Chulalongkorn University, 26 December 2013 – 16 January 2014. *
- 2013 CHIANG MAI, THAILAND, "Gardens of Eden" at CMU Art Museum – University Art Center, 8–30 November. *
- 2012 SINGAPORE, "The Substation" Contemporary Art Center, 22 May – 2 June 2012.
- 2011 BANGKOK, THAILAND, "Garden of Eden", Neilson Hays Rotunda Gallery.
- 2011 KUALA LUMPUR, MALAYSIA, UCSI Kuala Lumpur University. *
- 2010 UBUD, BALI, INDONESIA, Wina Gallery. (two women show)
- 2010 SINGAPORE, AAF – The Affordable Art Fair Singapore, E7. *
- 2010 SINGAPORE, As NEW FIND at ART SINGAPORE 2010. *
- 2010 SINGAPORE, Instinc Art Gallery. *
- 2009 KOPER, SLOVENIA, Gallery Meduza, Coastal Galleries Piran. *
- 2005 BRANIK, SLOVENIA, Villa Flora. Open Studio "PARIS PAINTINGS".
- 2005 PARIS, FRANCE Two man show Tjaša Demšar and Diek Grobler (South Africa), Cite´International des Arts.
- 2003 ONLINE, U.S.A., d’ART Gallery
- 2000 MURSKA SOBOTA, SLOVENIA, Gallery Murska Sobota. *
- 1999 SKOFJA LOKA, SLOVENIA, Gallery Groharjeva. *
- 1998 IZOLA, SLOVENIA, Gallery Insula.
- 1998 LJUBLJANA, SLOVENIA. Gallery Krka. *
- 1998 PAESE, TREVISO, ITALY, Municipal Gallery.
- 1997 CAERANO DI SAN MARCO, TREVISO, ITALY. Gallery Villa Benzi Zecchini.
- 1996 AMSTERDAM, THE NETHERLANDS, ART EXPO, Amsterdam RAI.
- 1993 GRONINGEN, THE NETHERLANDS, "Yellow Labyrinth", Gallery "S«.*

== Group exhibitions ==
- 2023 PARIS, FRANCE, More Than Mere Words, at Singulart Gallery
- 2022 PARIS, FRANCE, Winter Feeling at Singulart Gallery

(* indicates a publication)

- 2017 PONTREMOLI, ITALY, Pontremoli International Photography Festival, Tuscany, Italy 1–30 July
- 2017 KUALA LUMPUR, MALAYSIA, Joy of Life Exhibition, at PORT Commune*
- 2016 NEW DELHI, INDIA, SLOVENINDIA – Contemporary Art From Slovenia, at National Gallery of Modern Art*
- 2015 TRIESTE, ITALY, Gardens of Eden, at MINIMU Art Center
- 2012 IDRIJA, SLOVENIA, Slovenia Opened for Art Sinji Vrh International Art Symposium at Gewerkenegg Museum of Idria
- 2012 GORIZIA, ITALY, Slovenia Opened for Art Sinji Vrh International Art Symposium at Cosic Gallery
- 2012 RADOVLJICA, SLOVENIA, Slovenia Opened for Art Sinji Vrh International Art Symposium at Sivceva hisa Museum
- 2012 CHIANG MAI, THAILAND, 116 Art Gallery, "Nouvelle Expressionisme" (four women show), 15 December 2011 12. Feb. 2012. *
- 2011 SEŽANA, SLOVENIA, Slovenia Opened for Art Sinji Vrh International Art Symposium at Srecko Kosovel Cultural Art Center *
- 2011 BREŽICE, SLOVENIA Franc Les Art Collection at Brezice Posavski Museum, 11. Nov. 2011 – 8. Jan. *
- 2011 SIENA, ITALY "Drawing Connections", Siena Art Institute – founded by John Getty III, 24 Sep
- 2011 SINJI VRH, SLOVENIA, Slovenia Opened for Art, 1 July *
- 2011 AJDOVŠČINA, SLOVENIA, Slovenia Opened for Art, at Lična hisa Art Gallery 30 June *
- 2011 ČATEZ OB SAVI, SLOVENIA, "Franc Les" Artist Colony at County Hall.
- 2010 ŠENCUR, SLOVENIA, "Zlata Ribica" Art Collection at Šenčur Museum. *
- 2010 BOVEC, SLOVENIA, "Zlata Ribica" Art Collection, Fortress Kluže Exhibition Space. *
- 2010 HONG KONG, "Unwrap Your Mind", That Gallery.
- 2010 SLOVENJ GRADEC, SLOVENIJA, Majski salon *
- 2010 HONG KONG, "4x6", That Gallery.
- 2010 TOLMIN, SLOVENIA, "Zlata Ribica" Artist in Residency, Tolmin Public Library Exhibition Space. *
- 2009 PIRAN, SLOVENIA, Ex-Tempore Piran, Coastal Galleries Piran.
- 2009 BRANIK, SLOVENIA, Villa Flora Artist's Residency Program. Villa Flora.
- 2009 CASTAGNO, TUSCANY, ITALY, Artist's Colony Atelier d'Artista, "Il Genio Fiorentino Art Festival". Villa Castagno.
- 2009 GAMBASI TERME, TUSCANY, ITALY, Artist's Colony Atelier d'Artista. "Il Genio Fiorentino Art Festival". Piazza Gambasi Terme.
- 2008 MEDANA, SLOVENIA, "MMM art" Artist's Colony. Klinec.
- 2008 BRANIK, SLOVENIA, Villa Flora Artist's Residency Program. Villa Flora.
- 2008 BARCELONA, SPAIN, "Artterre Group", Galeria Zero.
- 2008 PIRAN, SLOVENIA, Ex-Tempore Piran, Magazin Monfort.
- 2008 LJUBLJANA, SLOVENIA, "Members of Kranj Artist's Association", Galerija ZDSLU.
- 2007 LJUBLJANA, SLOVENIA, "December Holiday Sale", Galerija ZDSLU.
- 2007 PIRAN, SLOVENIA, Ex-Tempore Piran, Magazin Monfort.
- 2007 MURSKA SOBOTA, SLOVENIA, Majski salon, Galerija Murska Sobota *
- 2006 CAMPELLO SUL CLITUGNNO, ITALY, "Vita bellissima", Studio Lithos.
- 2004 CAMPELLO SUL CLITUGNNO, ITALY, "Ecce Uomo", Studio Lithos.
- 2003 PRETORIA, SOUTH AFRICA, "BRAKE A SILENCE ARROUND HIV/Aids" [sic], Mind's I Art Space.
- 2003 PRETORIA, SOUTH AFRICA, "FINE LINE", Mind's I Art Space.
- 2002 PRETORIA, SOUTH AFRICA "MAIL ART", Mind's I Art Space.
- 2002 KRANJ, SLOVENIA, Kranj Biennal. France Prešern House, Kranj Museum. *
- 2002 PASIANO DI PORDENONE, ITALY, "FOUR WOMAN ARTISTS EXHIBITION", Villa Saccomani, *
- 2000 KOPER, SLOVENIA, "December Exhibition", Galerija Meduza.
- 1998 KRANJ, SLOVENIA, "May Days", Mala Gallery, Kranjski Museum.
- 1997 IZOLA, SLOVENIA, "Marine Universe". Gallery Alga.
- 1997 IZOLA, SLOVENIA, EX TEMPORE – Korte nad Izolo.
- 1995 MARIBOR, SLOVENIA, First Slovenian Festival of Computer art, Maribor Contemporary Art Center.
- 1995 GRONINGEN, THE NETHERLANDS, "Minerva Artists", Martini Zichenhuis.
- 1995 GRONINGEN, THE NETHERLANDS, "Minerva Artists", Martini hall.
- 1994 ORVELTE, DRENTHE, THE NETHERLANDS, "The Path of Painters", Orvelte, 12th century village – museum orders her a painting (1,5 x 2,5 m), that will remain exhibited in the country – side near Orvelte for the following ten years.
- 1992 GRONINGEN, THE NETHERLANDS, "Blue Labyrinth". Gallery "Biemonds Belang".
- 1990-2 FLORENCE, ITALY "Photography Exhibitions", International School of Fine Art Fortman Studios.

== Artist residencies ==
- 2024 GOWRY ART INSTITUTE, KALLAR, KERALA, INDIA
- 2024 ISHA FOUNDATION, COIMBATOR, INDIA
- 2019 KOH PHANGAN ISLAND, THAILAND, by La Fenice Art Gallery Hong Kong
- 2017 KUALA LUMPUR, MALAYSIA, Oriental Heritage House at Sentul, Nov.- Dec.
- 2016 KUALA LUMPUR, MALAYSIA, Oriental Heritage House at Sentul, Nov.- Dec.
- 2011 SINJI VRH, SLOVENIA, "Slovenia Opened for Art" – International Art Symposium
- 2011 ČATEŽ OB SAVI, SLOVENIA, "Franc Les" Artist Colony
- 2011 CHIANG MAI, THAILAND 116 Art Gallery Residency
- 2011 UBUD, BALI, INDONESIA Villa Flora in Bali Artist in Residency Program
- 2010 TOLMIN, SLOVENIA Zlata Ribica Art Colony
- 2010 SINGAPORE Instinc Artist in Residency Program
- 2009 BRANIK, SLOVENIA Villa Flora Artist in Residency Program
- 2009 GAMBASSI TERME, TUSCANY, ITALY Atelier d’Artista Artist's Residency, "Il Genio Fiorentino Festival"
- 2008 MEDANA, SLOVENIA MMM Art, Artist's Colony
- 2008 BRANIK, SLOVENIA Villa Flora Artist in Residency Program
- 2007 PARIS, FRANCE Grant from French Ministry for External Affaires for a 2-month stay at Cite´ International des Arts.
- 2006 PARIS, FRANCE Grant from Slovenian Art Association for a 2-month stay at Cite´ International des Arts
- 2005 PARIS, FRANCE Grant from Slovenian Art Association for a 2-month stay at Cite´ International des Arts.
- 2000 PARIS, FRANCE Grant from Slovenian Art Association for a 2-month stay at Cite´ International des Arts.
