= Branik =

Branik Rihemberk (until 1955)
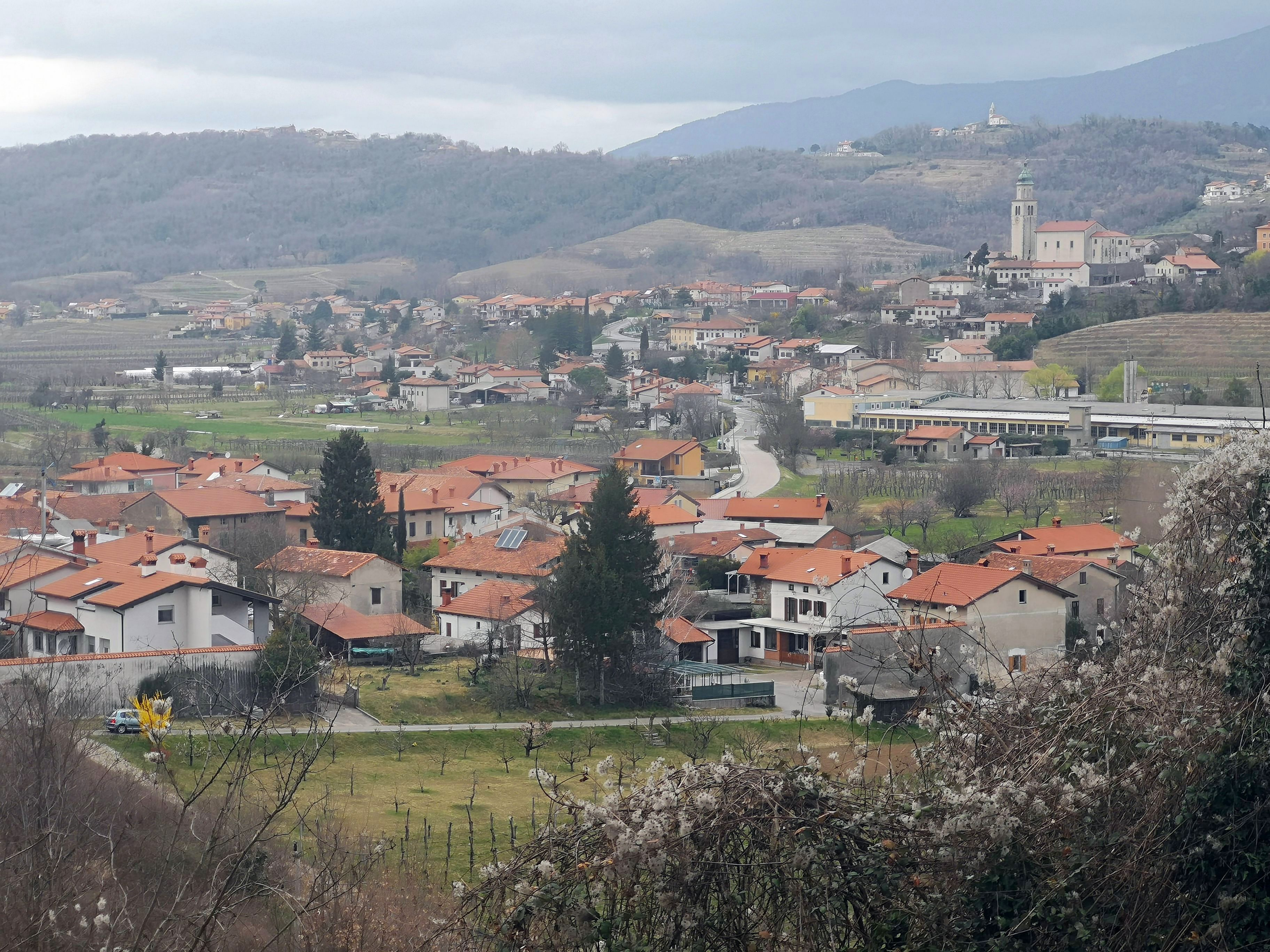

- Location in Slovenia
- Coordinates: 45°51′18.09″N 13°47′17.68″E
- Country: Slovenia
- Traditional region: Slovenian Littoral
- Statistical region: Gorizia
- Municipality: Nova Gorica

Area
  - Total: 14.76 km^{2} (5.70 sq mi)
- Elevation: 86.7 m (284 ft)

Population (2002)
  - Total: 1,000

Branik (pronounced [bɾaˈniːk]; Italian: Rifembergo, German: Reifenberg) is a village in western Slovenia in the Municipality of Nova Gorica. Until 2011, Pedrovo was a hamlet of Branik.

== Name ==
The name of the settlement was changed from Rihemberk (earlier Rifenberg, from German Reyfemberch, attested in 1274) to Branik in 1955. The name was changed on the basis of the 1948 Law on Names of Settlements and Designations of Squares, Streets, and Buildings as part of efforts by Slovenia's postwar communist government to remove German elements from toponyms. Rihemberk is still the name used for Branik Castle located above the village.

== Climate ==
Branik is in the Branik Valley, which is part of the Vipava Valley, just beneath the Karst Plateau. The location provides a favourable climate for the growth of Mediterranean fruits, such as figs and peaches. The area is also renowned for its wines, especially Vitovska Garganja, Barbera, Merlot, and Chardonnay.

== Church ==
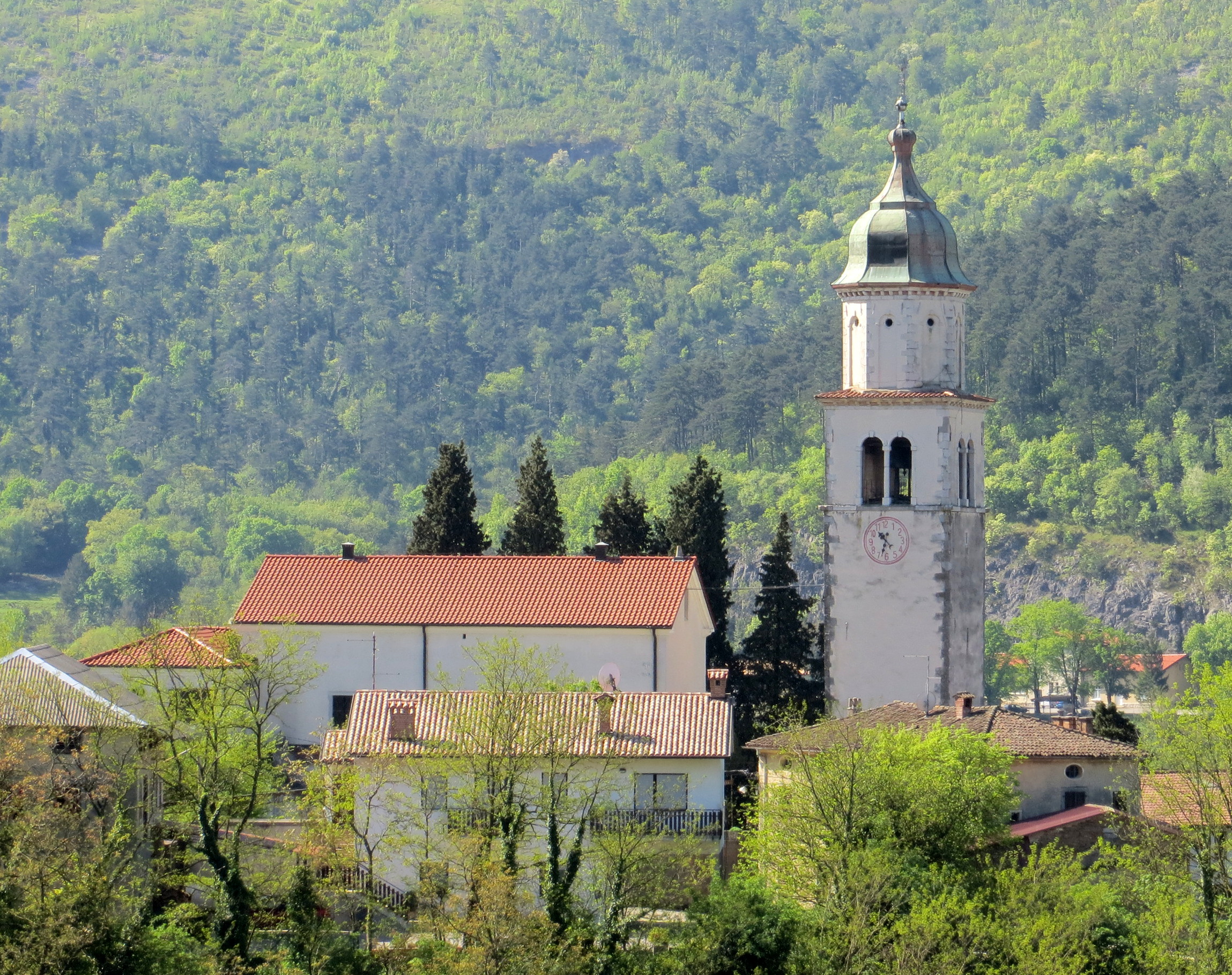
Saint Ulrich's Church

The parish church in the settlement is dedicated to Saint Ulrich and belongs to the Diocese of Koper.

== Notable people ==
Notable people that were born or lived in Branik include the following:

- Nevin Birsa (1947–2003), poet
- Rajko Bratož (born 1952), historian
- Ljudevit Furlani (1864–1913), translator and journalist
- Simon Gregorčič (1844–1906), poet
- Tjaša Iris (born 1968), painter
- Alois Franz Widmayer (1763–1831), major general

== See also ==
- Gorizia and Gradisca
- Austrian Littoral
- Julian March
- Wines of Slovenia
