= Pedrovo =

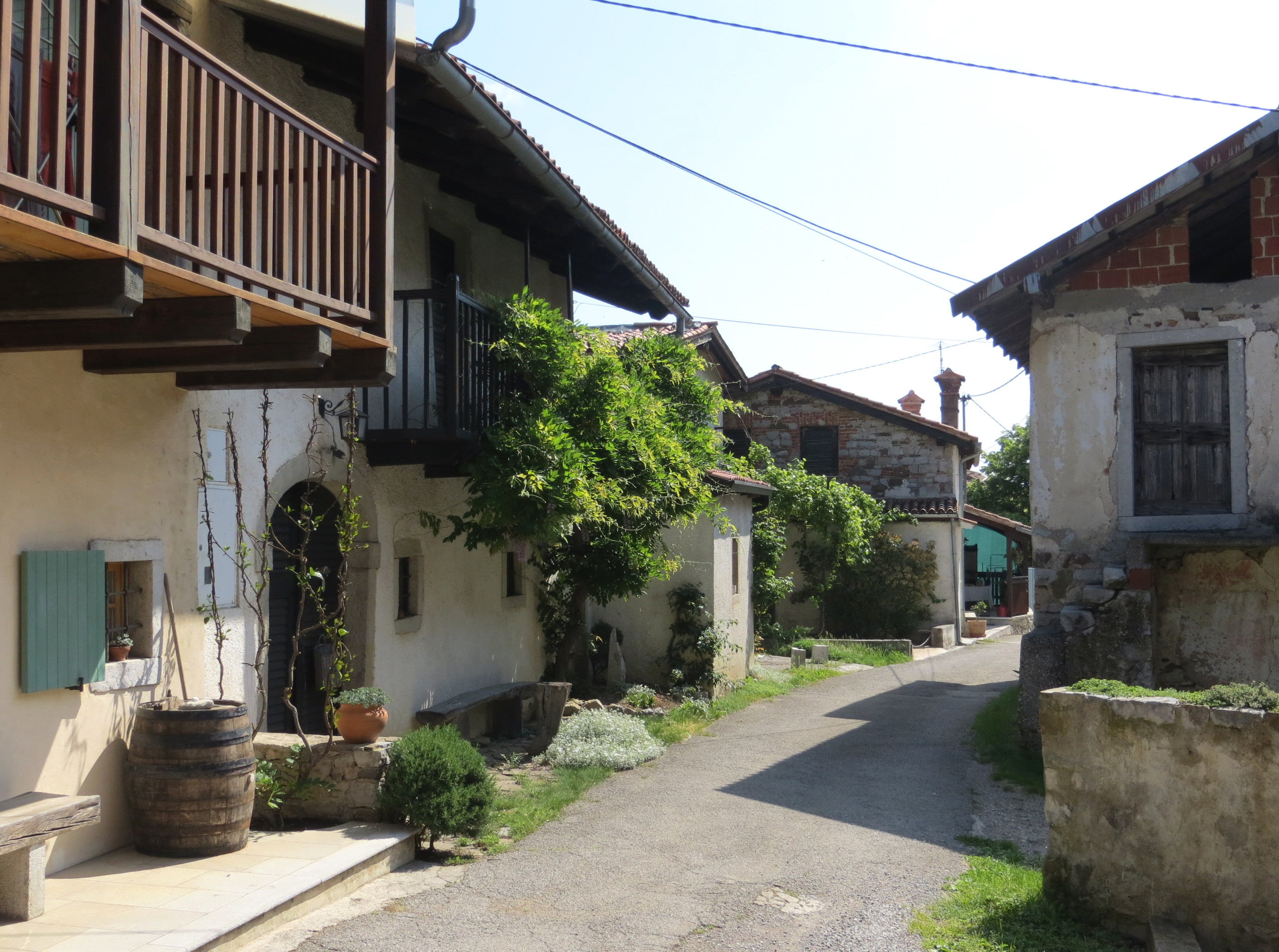

- Location in Slovenia
- Coordinates: 45°51′23.45″N 13°45′51.50″E
- Country: Slovenia
- Traditional region: Slovenian Littoral
- Statistical region: Gorizia
- Municipality: Nova Gorica

Area
  - Total: 1.5 km^{2} (0.58 sq mi)
- Elevation: 365 m (1,198 ft)

Population (2023)
  - Total: 15

Pedrovo (pronounced [ˈpeːdɾɔʋɔ]) is a settlement in the Municipality of Nova Gorica, western Slovenia. It was established in 2011. Previously, it was part of the settlement of Branik. In 2023, it had an area of 1.5 square kilometres (0.58 sq mi) and a population of 15.

== Church ==
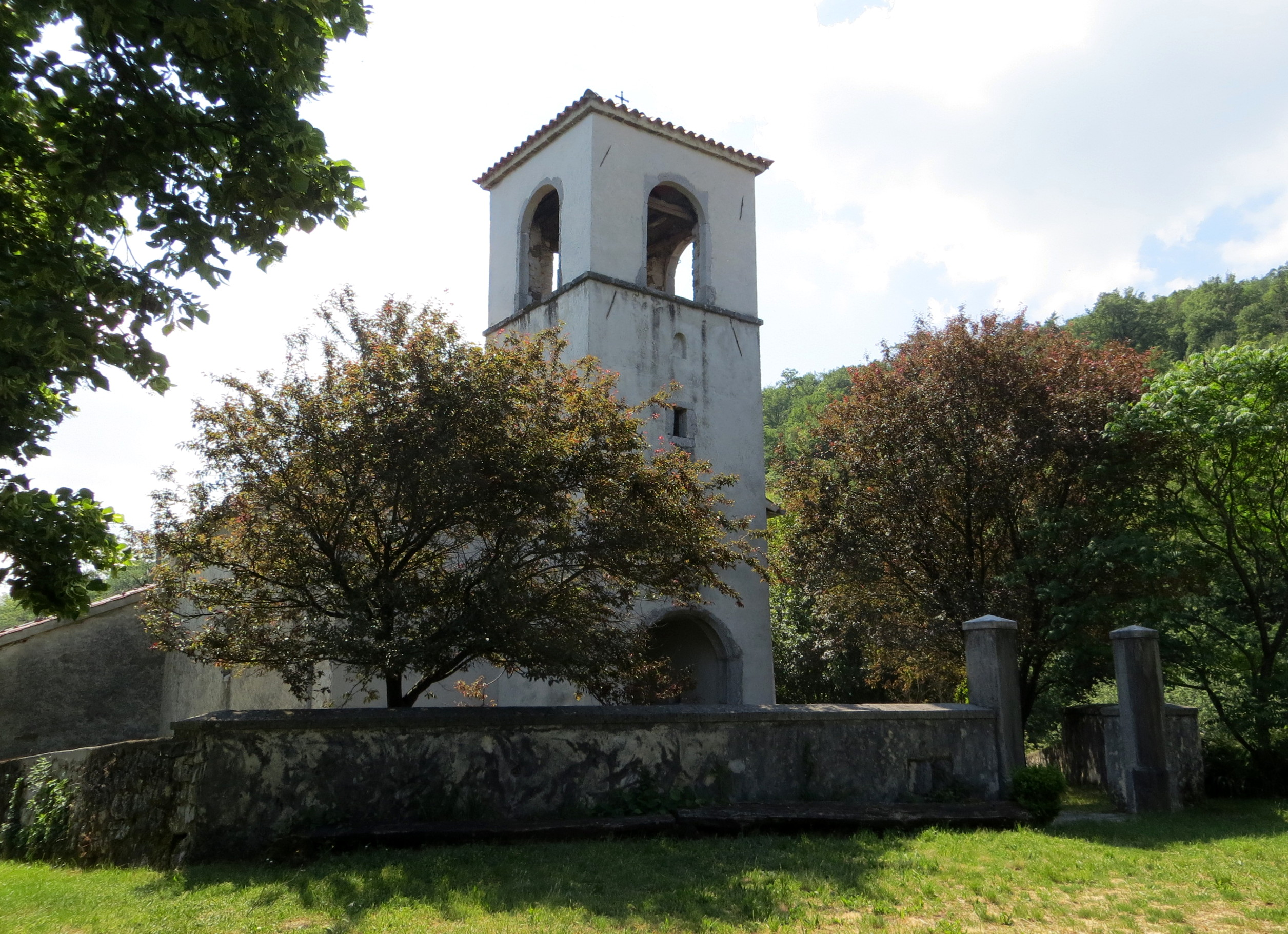
Holy Spirit Church

The church in Pedrovo is dedicated to the Holy Spirit and belongs to the Diocese of Koper.
