= Nevin Birsa (Slovene poet) =

Slovene poet

Nevin Birsa (August 25, 1947 – October 1, 2003) was a Slovene poet.

Birsa was born in the village of Branik (then known as Rihemberk) in the Vipava Valley, in western Slovenia. He studied at the Pedagogic Academy of the University of Ljubljana. He published numerous poetry collections, which gained widespread recognition, especially after his talent was pointed out by the poet and author Ciril Zlobec. Birsa lived in his home village most of his life, leading a simple lifestyle. His highly sophisticated poetry, which showed the influence of Georg Trakl, Rainer Maria Rilke, and Edvard Kocbek, attracted considerable interest regarding his personality.

Birsa was a quite prolific author. During his lifetime, he published 16 poetry collection and a posthumous collection of his unedited poetry was published in 2004.

Birsa died in his home village in 2003 and is buried at the local cemetery. In 2006, the local authorities created memorial spot in the local library. His birthplace is nearby.

== Volumes of poetry ==
- Elektronke v oče, 1970
- Rihemberk, 1974
- Jelen cvete med debli, 1975
- Pesniški list, 1977
- Nove ljubezenske pesmi, 1979
- Poskus maga, 1987
- Kdo ima žareči ključ, 1990
- Prva svetloba, 1992
- Samotni napis mavrice, 1994
- Skat širokega jutra, 1996
- Kresnice in pesnik (izbor iz prejšnjih zbirk), 1997
- Živali in rože, 1999
- Skice krvi in zvezd, 2001
- Boj za rdeče bleščanje, 2001
- Modrijan ali klovn, 2003
- To pomlad sem odšel v neznano (Collected works), 2004

== Literature ==
- Andrej Lutman, "Postaja na brezpotju, Spis o pesnjenju Nevina Birse", Mentor 25, no. 1–2 (2004).
