= Freienfeld =

- Comune
- Gemeinde Freienfeld; Comune di Campo di Trens
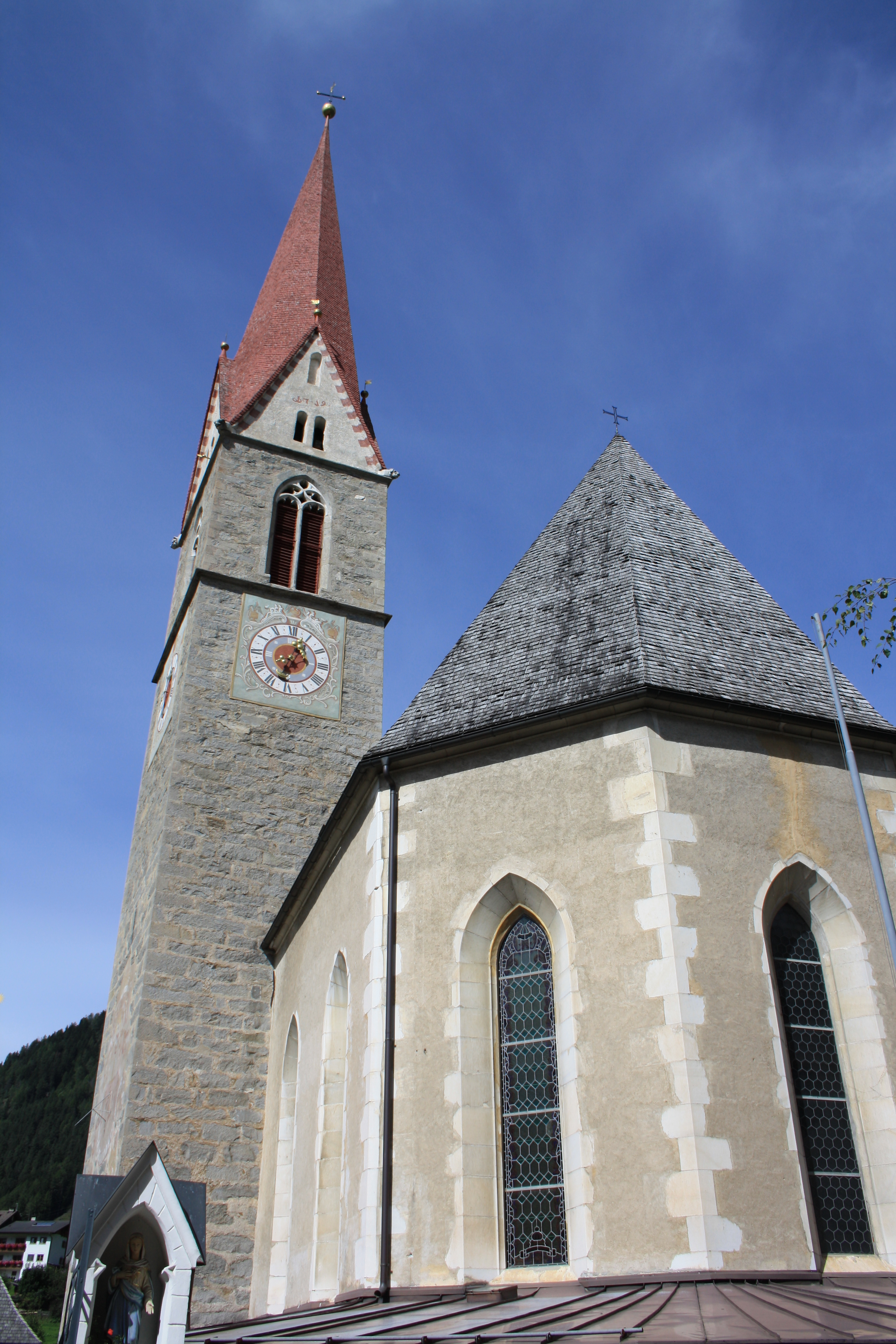

- Coat of arms

- Location within Italy Location within Trentino-Alto Adige/Südtirol
- Coordinates: 46°53′N 11°29′E
- Country: Italy
- Region: Trentino-Alto Adige/Südtirol
- Province: South Tyrol (BZ)
- Frazioni: Egg (Pruno), Elzenbaum, Flans (Flanes), Mauls (Mules), Niederried (Novale Basso), Pfulters (Fuldres), Ritzail (Rizzolo), Sprechenstein (Castelpietra), Stilfes (Stilves), Trens and Valgenäun (Valgenauna)

Government
  - Mayor: Verena Überegger

Area
  - Total: 95.3 km^{2} (36.8 sq mi)

Population (Nov. 2010)
  - Total: 2,668
  - Density: 28.0/km^{2} (72.5/sq mi)
- Demonym(s): German: Freienfelder; Italian: di Campo Trens
- Time zone: UTC+1 (CET)
  - Summer (DST): UTC+2 (CEST)
- Postal code: 39040
- Dialing code: 0472
- Website: Official website

Freienfeld (German pronunciation: [ˈfraɪɛnˌfɛlt]; Italian: Campo di Trens [ˈkampo di ˈtrɛns]) is a comune (municipality) and a village in the province of South Tyrol in northern Italy, located about 45 kilometres (28 mi) north of the city of Bolzano.

== Geography ==
As of 30 November 2010, it had a population of 2,668 and an area of 95.3 square kilometres (36.8 mi^{2}).

Freienfeld is located in the Eisacktal, 24 kilometres (15 mi) north of Brixen and 6 kilometres (4 mi) south of Sterzing along the State road SS 12 where the valley opens up, just before Mauls, reaching the plain of Sterzing. The original core of Trens is situated on an elevated position on the eastern side of the "Trens Summit", while the village has evolved downward up to the state road, beyond this there is the Brenner railway, the Eisack river and the motorway A22. The municipality also includes the villages of Stilfes and Mauls, the first in the plain in front of Trens beyond the river, the second 5 km (3 mi) to the south at the entrance of the homonymous valley.

=== Neighbour municipalities ===
Freienfeld borders the following municipalities: Franzensfeste, Ratschings, Mühlbach, Sarntal, Pfitsch, and Sterzing.

=== Frazioni ===
The municipality of Freienfeld contains the frazioni (subdivisions, mainly villages and hamlets) Egg (Pruno), Elzenbaum, Flans (Flanes), Mauls (Mules), Niederried (Novale Basso), Pfulters (Fuldres), Ritzail (Rizzolo), Sprechenstein (Castelpietra), Stilfes (Stilves), Trens and Valgenäun (Valgenauna).

== History ==
=== Origin ===
The town was already inhabited in prehistoric times, as shown by archaeological finds at the St. Valentine Church in Valgenäun, as in the Roman period, a milestone of Septimius Severus, dating back to 201 AD, was found in Freienfeld; the tombstone of Aurelia Ruffino and the sacred stone dedicated to the god of light Mithras were found in Mules. In 450 the territory was invaded by Bavarii during their migration southbound. In a document dating from 827, Quartino made a gift of his property, including the villages of Stilfes and Trens to the Church of Innichen, while in 990 Adalbert von Stilfes donated to the Diocese of Brixen the villages of Stilfes, Niederried, Mauls and the valleys nearby.

In 1100 at the Stilfes was entrusted by the Bishop's powers, the administration of the Eisack Valley based at Castle Rafeinstein; in 1200, due to the extinction of the family, the bishop transferred the authority to the Trauston who obtained, as a feud, the Sprechenstein Castle. In 1525, during the period of peasant struggles, the church of Stilfes was sacked several times.

=== From 1809 ===
In August 1809 during the Tyrolean Rebellion, in an ambush near "Grassstein", 500 Saxons who fought for the French troops as the Rhine were captured by the Tyroleans, in retaliation the village of Flans was fired.

The reorganization of Commons, made in 1849, led to a reduction of these, from nine to three: Stilfes, Trens and Mauls. On October 18, 1928, by decree, the three municipalities were reunited in a single, the Municipality of Freienfeld.

Nearby the village of Mauls, take place one of the defences of the “Vallo Alpino Littorio in Alto Adige”, a set of bunkers wanted by Benito Mussolini, which formed the Mauls barrage. In the last period of the Second World War, the area was hit by bombing the railway bridge over the river and the ammunition storage at Stilfes.

The Municipality of Freienfeld joined, in 1967, the Community of the Valleys of the Eisacktal until 1979 to establish, together with the other municipalities, the Wipptal District Community.

=== Coat-of-arms ===
The emblem of the Municipality of Freienfeld consists of argent equilateral triangle, with the sides curved inward, inscribed in a vert shield. The three vert sectors mean the three municipalities: Trens, Stilfes and Mauls, and the white part is the central Municipality of Freienfeld. The emblem was granted in 1968.

== Main sights ==
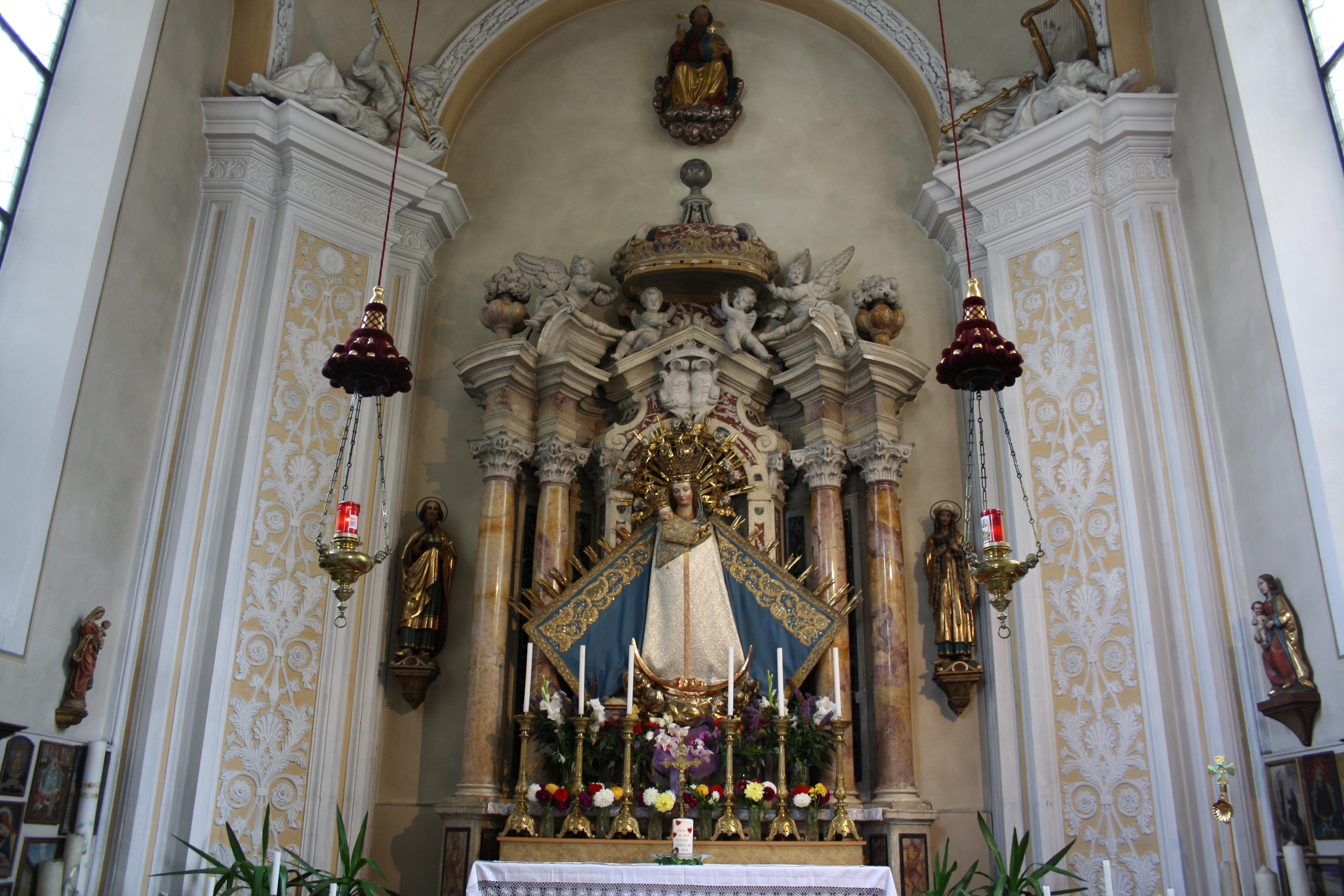
The Chapel Our Lady of the Snow

=== Religious architecture ===
==== Sanctuary Maria Trens ====
Trens is also a place of pilgrimage, the church is dedicated to the miraculous image of “Our Lady of the Avalanche”, the ancient wooden statue of the “Madonna standing and the Child”, dating back to 1470. According to a legend, a farmer found a wood-carved statue among the debris of a landslide and carried it to his house. The following day the statue was found in a chapel and the people began to venerate it. In a document dated 10 September 1345, it is mentioned for the first time of a church in Trens, in 1407 the family Trauston appointed a weekly Mass to be celebrated on Tuesday in the church. The present church was built in 1498 in Late Gothic with two main entrances; the priest of Stilves obtained a “littera indulgentiarum” from twelve cardinals in 1482 in order to ease the construction. The chaplain of the deanery of Trens received in 1648 the commission to say Mass every day in Trens and the pilgrimages to the church increased. The “Chapel of Our Lady” was inaugurated on 29 March 1728, and take place on the left side of the nave with the wall covered by the numerous votive offering. At the half of the 18th century, the church underwent a restoration in Baroque on a plan by Joseph Adam Ritter von Mölk. The miraculous image was crowned in 1928 and the church became a parish in 1939.

==== Stilfes Saint Peter Parish church ====
The ancient ecclesiastical centre is Stilfes that is still the main church of the village. The church is dedicated to "St. Peter" and is mentioned for the first time in 827. The present imposing church has a single nave and two lateral altars beside the high altar. The interior is decorated in the late Baroque style and the frescos are by Christoph Brandstätter. The choir is placed over the front entrance and the slim bell tower was built in 1568.

==== Mauls Saint Oswald Parish church ====
The first church in Mauls was built in 1329. The present church is dedicated to Saint Oswald and is distinguished by an imposing stone bell tower with a roof spire. The interior frescos are painted by different artists of the 18th and 19th centuries.

=== Military architecture ===
==== Welfenstein Castle ====
Welfenstein is a private castle situated north of the village of Mauls. It was built in the thirteenth century near the Eisack river, in a good position to check the traffic. In 1918 it was destroyed by fire but was rebuilt.

==== Reifenstein Castle ====
Reifenstein Castle is located south of Sterzing, in the municipality of Freienfeld, at the top of a rock opposite side the Sprechenstein Castle. It is one of the oldest castles in South Tyrol built around the 12th century.

== Economy ==
=== Industry ===
On the territory of Freienfeld is the Wolf System, a European multinational industry in the field of building systems in the residential, industrial, commercial and agricultural sectors. The company won, after the 2009 earthquake, one of the contracts and has delivered 500 housing units in L’Aquila. Freienfeld plant employs 200 people.

== Society ==
=== Linguistic distribution ===
According to the 2024 census, 95.56% of the population speak German, 4.12% Italian and 0.32% Ladin as first language.

=== Demographic evolution ===
Historical population

Year	Pop.	±%
1861	?	—
1871	?	—
1881	?	—
1901	?	—
1911	?	—

Year	Pop.	±%
1921	1,912	—
1931	2,183	+14.2%
1936	2,175	−0.4%
1951	2,268	+4.3%
1961	2,163	−4.6%

Year	Pop.	±%
1971	2,152	−0.5%
1981	2,309	+7.3%
1991	2,383	+3.2%
2001	2,458	+3.1%

Source: Data from ISTAT
