= Baku during World War II =

War-political situation, economy, mobilization and culture

Baku occupied a special place in the plans of Nazi Germany. The head of the Foreign Policy Department of the NSDAP, Alfred Rosenberg, drew up a special "Plan for the management of the Caucasus", which assumed the inclusion of Baku in the sphere of influence of the Third Reich. According to the plan, it was necessary to occupy Baku by September 25, 1942.

== Military-political situation ==
In March 1941, Adolf Hitler issued an instruction according to which, following the occupation of Baku, the production, processing, and transportation of Baku oil had to be provided by the "Continental Oil Society". It was planned to turn Baku into a major military facility.

In the summer of 1942, Operation Edelweiss was drawn up in order to capture the Caucasus, in particular, Baku and Grozny. A similar plan called Velvet was also drawn up by the allies of the USSR – England and the United States.

In 1942–1943, 74 attempts of the German air forces to invade Baku were stopped.

== Military and economic mobilization ==
There was Baku Automobile Plant built in the city. More than 130 types of weapons were manufactured: Katyusha missiles, Yak-3, P-39 and UTI-4 fighters, Shpagin machine guns, and so on.

According to the Resolution of the State Defense Committee of April 5, 1942, in May, the Baku Air Defense Corps district was reorganized, as a result of which, the Baku Air Defense Army was formed.

After the declaration of martial law in September 1942, the Baku Defense Area was laid down.

== Economic situation ==
In 1940, the groundwork for drilling ultra-deep wells in the oil fields of Baku was laid.

On December 24, 1940, the Central Committee of the CPSU (b) adopted a resolution "On strengthening the material and technical base and ensuring the development of oil production and refining in the Baku oil region".

In 1940, 71.4% of all oil production, 80% of aviation gasoline, 90% of ligroin and kerosene, 96% of automotive and industrial oils in the USSR were produced by Baku enterprises.

On June 22, 1941, a mass meeting of workers was held in Baku.

In 1942, an inter-regional intelligence school was opened in Baku.

In the autumn of 1942, a resolution of the State Defense Committee was issued, according to which nine Baku drilling offices and oil enterprises were transferred to Bashkiria, Kuibyshev, Perm, and Orenburg in order to ensure the accelerated development of oil production.

In 1942, a shipping depot for industrial enterprises that were sent to the regions of Central Asia and Kazakhstan was built.

There was also an aircraft repair plant, an evacuated plant of the People's Commissariat of Aviation Industry, a plant for the production of high-octane alkylbenzene, a branch of the plant for testing new types of naval weapons.

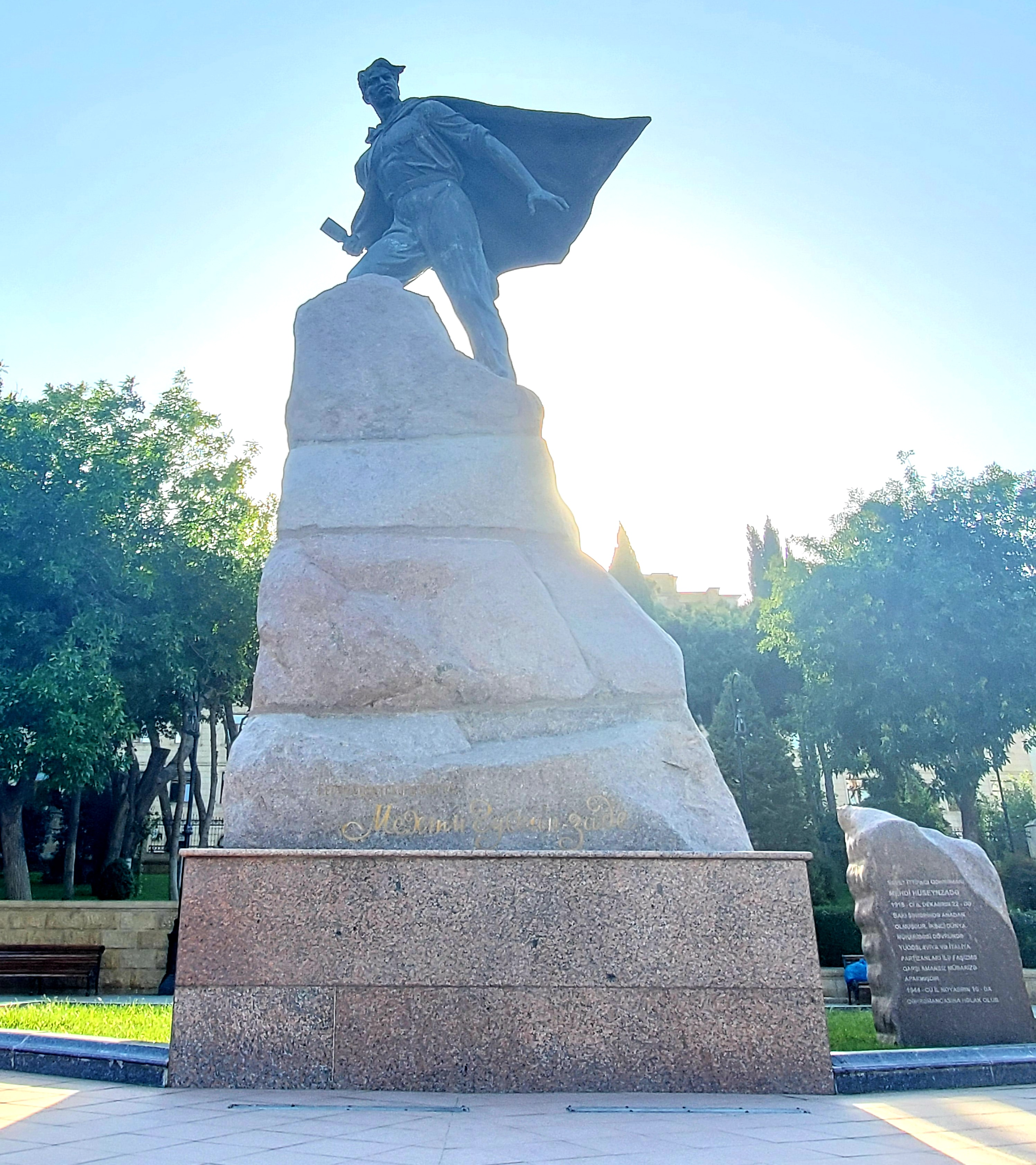
Mehdi Huseynzade Monument in Baku

At a meeting of the all Baku party activists in August 1942, it was decided to erect defensive structures around the city, as well as to create fighter battalions.

== Culture ==
In 1943, the film Submarine T-9 was shot at the Baku Film Studio.

On January 23, 1945, the Academy of Sciences of the Azerbaijan SSR was established.

To this day, there are monuments to war heroes in Baku—Mehdi Huseynzade, Hazi Aslanov, Geray Asadov, Richard Sorge (1981). The memorial complex "Mass Grave" and the memorial monument "1941–1945" were built.

Every year, on May 9, Baku hosts commemorative events dedicated to "WWII Victory Day".

== See also ==
- Azerbaijan in World War II
