= Azerbaijan in World War II =

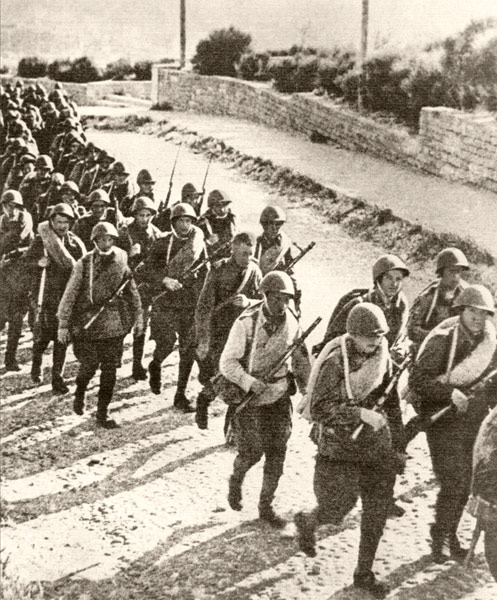
Battalion sent to the front, on the road to the Balajary station

The Azerbaijan Soviet Socialist Republic entered World War II with the Soviet Union after the German declaration of war on June 22, 1941. Azerbaijan's oilfields were enticing to the Germans due to the USSR's heavy dependency on Caucasus oil – setting the scene for German campaigns attempting to capture and seize the oilfields in Baku during the Battle of the Caucasus. Azerbaijan’s oil was very decisive for Soviet victory. More than 600,000 people from Azerbaijan were conscripted to the Workers’ and Peasants’ Red Army during World War II from 1941 to 1945. 400,000 of whom perished

== Pre-war ==
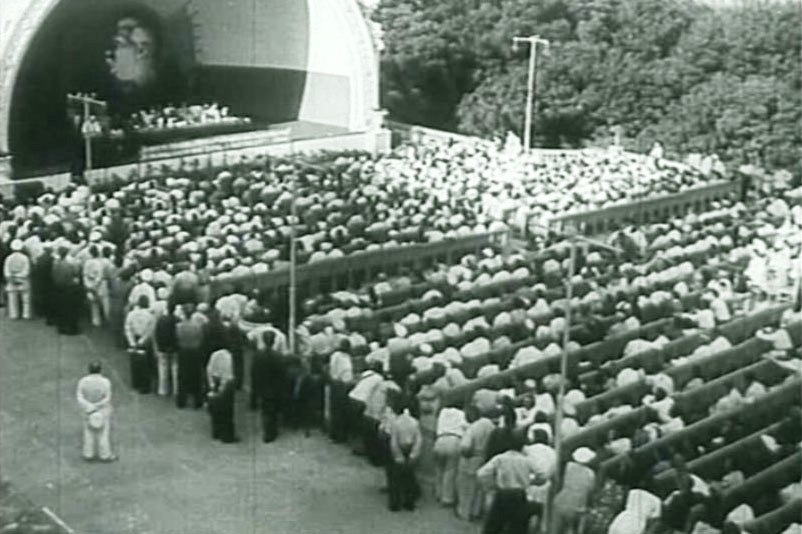
Announcement of the German invasion to an audience in Baku, June 1942

=== Operation Pike ===
The mechanized German army aimed to secure a large supply of oil. Baku, the capital of Azerbaijan, provided an overwhelming share of Soviet oil production. In an agreement of February 1940 following the August 1939 Molotov–Ribbentrop Pact, Germany and the Soviet Union committed to exchange German machinery, manufactures, and technology for Soviet resources. The Soviet Union thus supplied over 900,000 tons of oil to Germany. This trade arrangement, known to the Allies, fueled Allied propaganda portraying the Soviet Union as a German ally.

Operation Pike was a plan developed by the United Kingdom and France to bomb Baku in a surprise long-range raid from airbases in Iraq and Syria in order to hinder this oil delivery to Germany. Despite being at peace with the Soviet Union, the Allies performed reconnaissance flights to prepare. As later shown by the limited effects of strategic bombing during the war, the plan's potential impact was greatly overestimated, while it risked negative diplomatic and other results for the Allies. The fall of France in June 1940 cancelled the plan; Germany captured plan documents from France and revealed them to the Soviet Union, increasing its distrust of the Allies.

== Military campaigns ==
=== Battle of the Caucasus ===
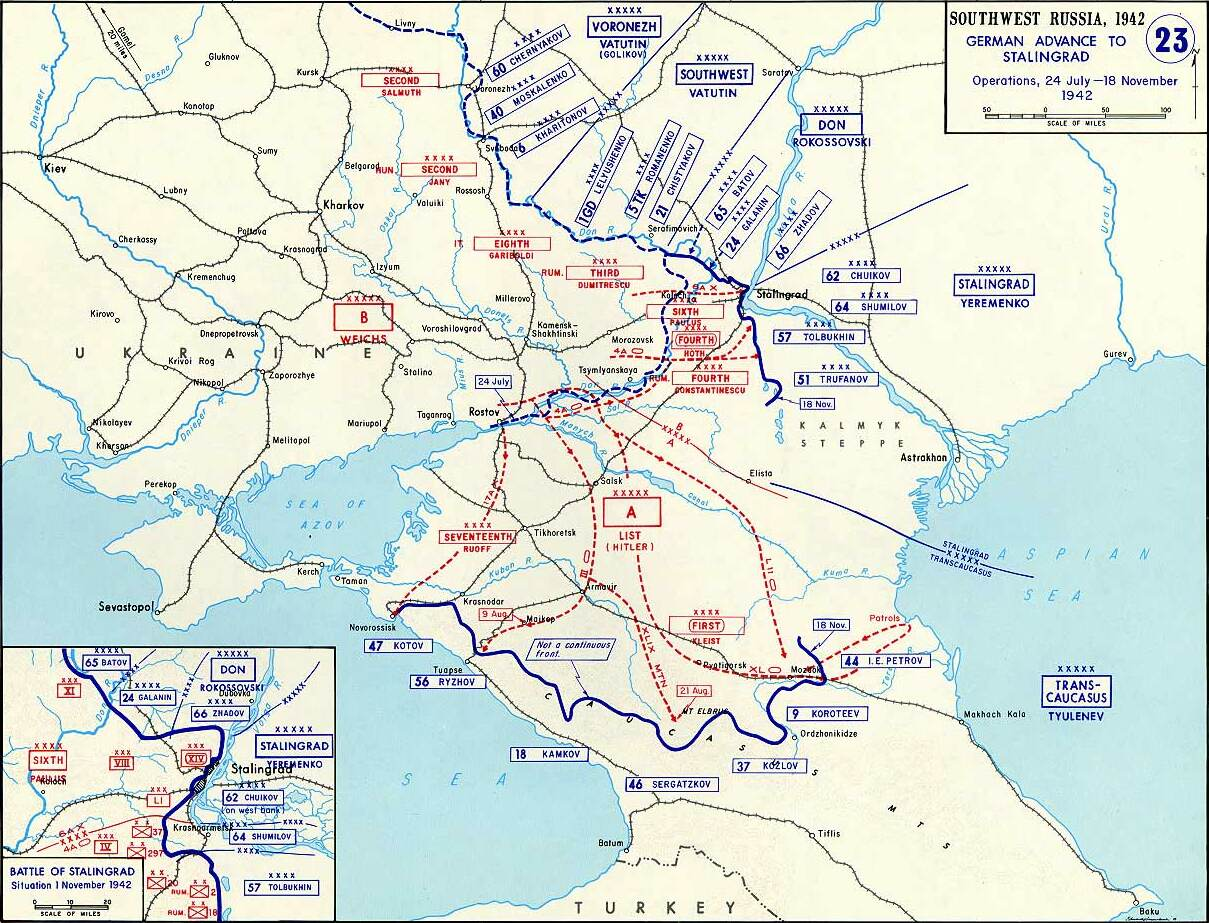
German attack: June–November, 1942

By the time of the German invasion, Baku and the North Caucasus were the main sources of oil for the whole of the USSR. The Soviet Union also relied heavily on the Caucasus region for its grain, following the fall of Ukraine. The region also possessed large reserves of strategic raw materials such as tungsten and molybdenum ore. Loss of the Caucasus would have proved devastating for the USSR: not only would they lose a substantial amount of oil production, which fueled the Red Army, they would also lose a valuable source of precious metals and the increasingly vital crop of grain. These reasons all contributed to why Hitler had intentions of taking the Caucasus in series of campaigns. German armies given orders to take Azerbaijani oil were identified with the letter "A".

German armies in the Caucasus area were ordered to surround and destroy the Southern Front, the area around the Don River, and to seize the city of Rostov-on-Don. Following the capture of Rostov-on-Don, the North Caucasus would theoretically be open to German invasion. The Germans intended to pass around the Greater Caucasus with an army from the South, capturing key cities such as Novorossiysk and Tuapse, and, with another group from the East, to capture the oil rich regions of Grozny and Baku simultaneously. The Germans also wanted to overcome the Dividing Ridge in the central part of the Caucasus Mountains in order to allow an entrance into Soviet Georgia using a bypass maneuver.

=== Operation Edelweiss ===
In 1942 on the Eastern Front, the German army approached the South Caucasus. Hitler was eager to capture Azerbaijan, seeking oil to strengthen the German army and weaken the Soviet Union – whose economy relied heavily on oil and fossil fuels. Operation Edelweiss was planned to commence on September 26, 1942. To protect the Azerbaijani oil fields, Joseph Stalin organized the North Caucasian Front along the German route of advance in the southern Caucasus. In late 1942, the reorganized Front consistently proved a tough obstacle for the Axis forces. The Axis divisions, consisting of German and Romanian troops, suffered heavy losses before they could reach the foothills on the Terek River and the Caucasus Mountains. Throughout the 1942 campaign, German and Soviet troops launched small, indecisive offensives against each other. Eventually, the Axis was forced to divert divisions from the Caucasus front to aid the Germans in the Battle of Stalingrad. This allowed for a Soviet offensive that drove the remaining Axis forces out of the Caucasus region, effectively defeating the Axis Caucasus campaign. The "A" group of armies lost about 100,000 troops in the operation. Soviet losses to the Caucasus Front in 1942 totaled about 140,000 irrecoverable losses and 170,000 sick and wounded.

=== Anglo-Soviet Invasion of Iran ===
From August 25 to September 17, 1941, Great Britain and the Soviet Union carried out a joint invasion of Iran. This invasion was intended to secure and defend the Allied supply lines through the area along with overthrowing the king of Persia, Rezā Shāh, who was suspected of sympathizing with the Axis. Rezā Shāh refused to deploy British and Soviet troops at their request, violating the agreement between the Soviets and Iranians in 1921. According to the agreement, the USSR had a right to deploy its troops in Iranian territory in the case of threats to its southern borders.

The Soviet forces invaded Iran from Azerbaijan in the west and the Turkmen in the east. They occupied the northern Iranian provinces of Azerbaijan and Golestan. The British invaded through their middle eastern colony of Iraq and south asian colony India and occupied the western provinces of Kermanshah, Ilam, and Khuzestan. After failed negotiations between allied forces and king Rezā Shāh, the Red Army marched into Tehran on September 17. Following the surrender of Tehran, Persia capitulated, and the British and Soviets agreed to occupy the country until the end of the war. The allied forces also deposed the Shah and put his younger son, Mohammad Reza Pahlavi, on the throne. The final Soviet troops were removed from Iran in 1946.

== Trans-Iranian Lend-Lease route ==
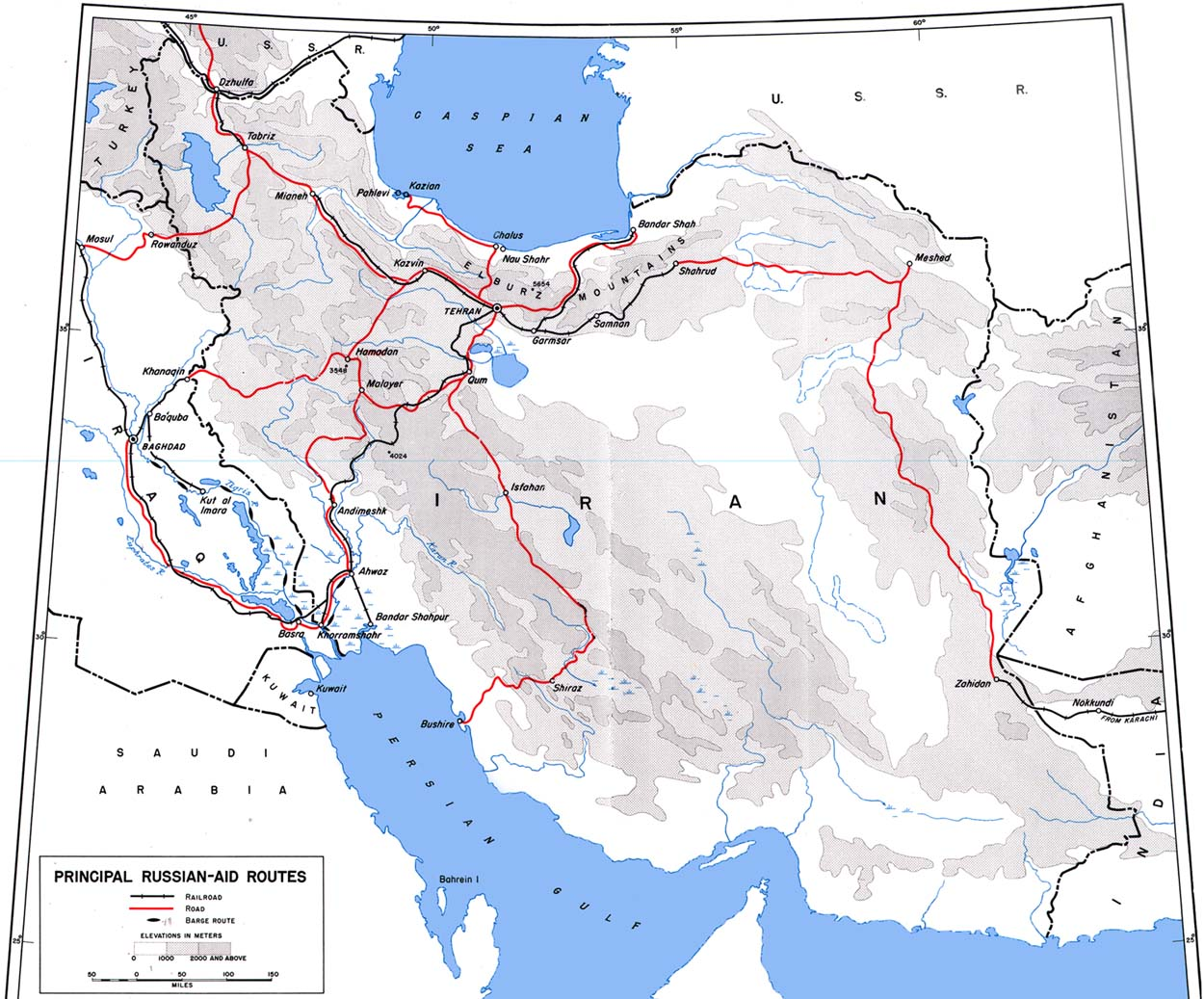
Map of the route

The Trans-Iranian Lend-Lease route was the pathway used to get American and British supplies from the Persian Gulf through Persia and into the Soviet Union via Azerbaijan. The previous route of entering supplies to the Soviet Union; the North Atlantic Sea Lane, closed in July 1942 following the debacle of Convoy PQ 17. The alternative new route was in the east; into Vladivostok. Although Russia and Japan weren't foes, transporting large cargo into Russia from the United States proved to impractical, so the southern route through Iran was chosen. The Lend-Lease between the allies and Iran was implemented by Ally sympathizer Mohammad Reza Pahlavi following the overthrow of his father's regime in the Anglo-Soviet Invasion of Iran. The successful transport of Allied supplies through Iran and the Caucasus into the Soviet Union was instrumental in the defense of Russia against the Germans.

== Population of the Azerbaijan SSR at the battle and home fronts ==
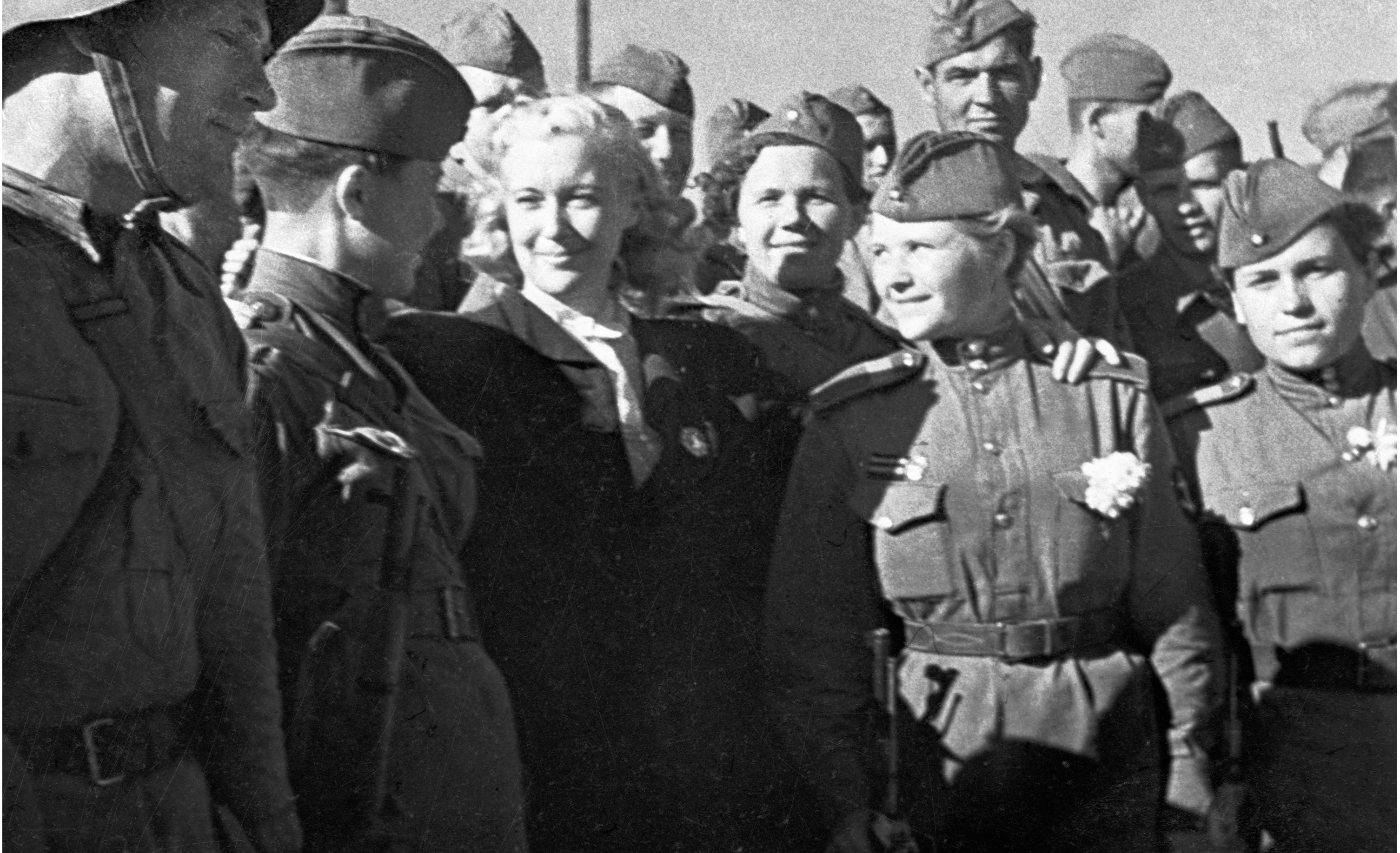
Lyubov Orlova sees off soldiers to Balajary station (Baku).

681,000 soldiers were conscripted to the front lines from the Azerbaijan SSR. Out of the 681,000 troops, about 300,000 Azerbaijani troops were killed in action. 15,000 medical workers were deployed on the Eastern Front, along with 3,750 operators of motorized vehicles. Azerbaijani women also participated in the fight against the Axis, some notable women include partisan Aliya Rustambeyova, sniper Ziba Ganiyeva, aviation navigator Zuleykha Seyidmammadova, anti-aircraft gunner Almaz Ibrahimova, and captain Shovkat Salimova.

Azerbaijani troops played a large role in the Defense of Brest Fortress, the Siege of Leningrad, the Battle of Moscow, the Battle of Stalingrad, the Battle of Kursk, and the Battle of Berlin. These troops were stationed in the Crimean peninsula of the Ukraine, as well as Eastern Europe and the Baltics.

Azerbaijan played a major role in the Battle of the Caucasus with Azerbaijani civilians providing resistance to the German advance.

=== National military units of the Red Army ===
The following military units were created in the territory of the Azerbaijan SSR:

- 87 battalions
- 1123 self-defense squads

The following divisions were created in the territory of the Azerbaijan SSR:

- 77th Rifle Division in 1942, from a Mountain Rifle Division which traced its history back to 1920
- 223rd Rifle Division
- 396th Rifle Division
- 402nd Rifle Division
- 416th Rifle Division

Military units and formations in which significant numbers of Azerbaijani citizens served:

- 76th Mountain Rifle Division named after K.E.Voroshilov (later the 51st Guards Rifle Division of Taganrog)
- 77th 'Simferopolskaya Red Banner, Order of Suvorov Division Sergo Ordzhonikidze' Mountain Rifle Division
- 223rd 'Belgrade Red Banner Azerbaijan' Rifle Division
- 227th Rifle Division
- 396th Rifle Division
- 402nd Rifle Division
- 416th Taganrog, Red Banner, Order of Suvorov Division Rifle Division

=== Azerbaijani recipients of the title Hero of the Soviet Union ===
A total of 128 residents of Azerbaijan were awarded the title of Hero of the Soviet Union for military valor and feats shown during World War II, of which 42 were ethnic Azerbaijani; 14 of the titles were awarded posthumously. Lieutenant Israfil Mammadov was the first Azerbaijani awarded the title Hero of the Soviet Union. Major-General Hazi Aslanov received the title twice.

=== Partisan detachments and groups in countries of Western and Eastern Europe ===
Name	Country/Republic	Commander
Azerbaijani Partisan Detachment	France	Huseynrza Mammadov
Azerbaijani Partisan Detachment – "Ruska Cheta"	Italy	Javad Hakimli
The 8th Azerbaijani Partisan Detachment – "Krasniy Partizan"	Crimean ASSR	Mammad Aliyev
Raiding Party of "Pravda" Partisan Detachment	Byelorussian SSR	Mammad Aliyev

=== Guerrillas in the ranks of the resistance in Western and Eastern Europe ===
Guerilla	Country/Republic
Nuru Abdullayev	France
Hasan Aliyev	France
Mazaim Aliyev	Italy
Mammad Samad oglu Baghirov	Poland
Vali Valiyev	France
Mikayil Huseynov	France
Mehdi Huseynzade	(Socialist Federal Republic of Yugoslavia) Yugoslavia; Italy
Khanchoban Jafarov	Italy
Pasha Jafarkhanli	France
Ahmadiyya Jabrayilov	France
Feyzulla Gurbanov	France
Huseynrza Mammadov	France
Gurban Mammadov	France
Mirzakhan Mammadov	France
Mammad Mammadov	Netherlands
Mirzali Mammadli	France
Nurush Mehdiyev	France
Jalil Rafiyev	Italy
Ali Taghiyev	(Socialist Federal Republic of Yugoslavia) Yugoslavia; Italy
Javad Hakimli	(Socialist Federal Republic of Yugoslavia) Yugoslavia; Italy
Mirza Shahverdiyev	Italy
Mashi Eylazov	Poland

=== Caspian Flotilla ===
The Caspian Flotilla was instrumental for cargo-turnover until World War II. Approximately one third of all cargo transported throughout the seas of the USSR was delivered along the Caspian Sea through the Flotilla. Among various reasons for this was the close proximity of oil deposits, petroleum refineries, and cotton storehouses. Transportation of wood and bread to the Caucasus and Middle Asia, which were delivered through the Caspian Sea via the Volga and the Urals, also influenced the high level of cargo-turnover. Oil and oil products, which were mainly transported from Baku to Astrakhan for further transportation to other regions of the USSR through the Volga River were the main goods determining significance of the Caspian Sea. The territory of Azerbaijan, mainly Baku-Baladjary point, located on the junction of railway and marine roads, was the important link on the railway road of the South Caucasus.

Baku oil was transported to all regions of the USSR, and Baku's port was distinguished for a high intensity of cargo handling and passing capabilities. Transportation of oil to the Volga River was the main use of the port.

=== Baku Air Defense Army ===
The Baku Air Defense Army was established by resolution of the State Defense Committee on April 5, 1942. Its administration was created on the basis of reformed administration of the 3rd Air Defense Corps. Initially, it was part of the Transcaucasian Air Defense Zone. In April 1944 it became part of the Transcaucasian Air Defense Front. Between May and October, 1942, during the period of sorties by German reconnaissance aircraft over the army's area of responsibility, the army included the following units:

- The 8th Anti-Aircraft Corps of anti-aircraft defense (6 destructive aircraft regiments);
- 7 regiments of antiaircraft artillery;
- 1 regiment of antiaircraft machineguns;
- 1 searchlight regiment;
- A regiment of aerostatic obstacle;
- A regiment of troops of air observation, warning and connection (VNOS);
- Other units.

The army's commanders were P.M.Beskrovnov, general-major of artillery (April 1942 – February 1945) and N.V.Markov, general-lieutenant of artillery (February, 1945 – till the end of the war).

== Economy of Azerbaijan during the wartime ==
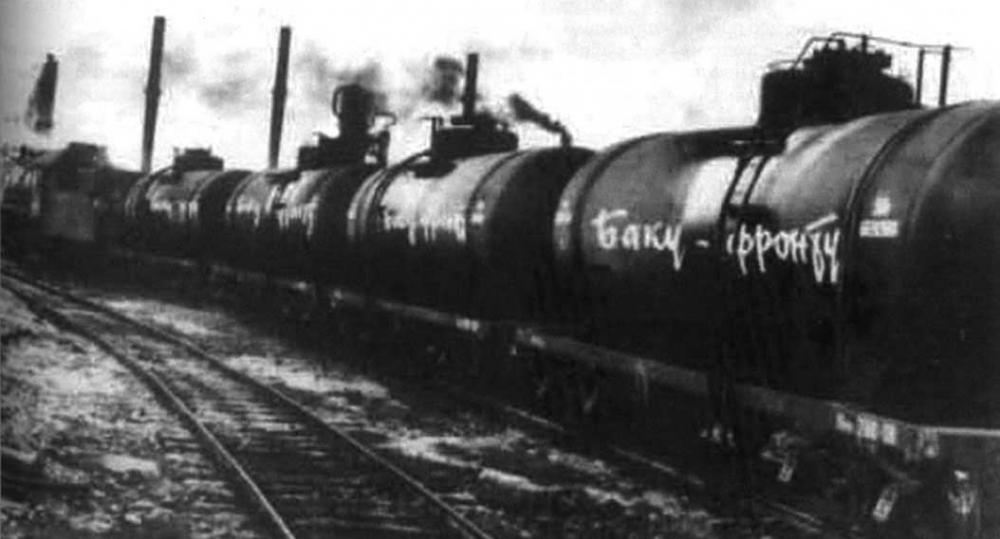
Oil tankers in Baku moved to front.

Prior to World War II, Soviet Azerbaijan was one of the world's largest producers of oil, oil products, and petroleum equipment, hugely contributing to the Soviet Union to be ranked next to the United States and Canada in oil production. Despite ongoing military actions, Baku remained the main provider of fuels and lubricants, sending 23.5 million tons of oil in the first year of the war alone. A total of 75 million tons of oil were transported for military needs throughout World War II. Vasiliy Istratov, former ambassador of Russia to Azerbaijan wrote:

"There wouldn’t be any victory in World War II without natural resources of Azerbaijan."

Toiling under the "Everything for front! Everything for victory!" slogan, Azerbaijani oilmen were awarded a Red challenge banner of the State Defense Committee, All-Union Central Council of Professional Unions and National Commissariat of Oil Industry of the USSR, which was indicative of a high level of work in the region.

Nikolai Baibakov, a citizen of Baku, was in charge of a special headquarters coordinating the supply of military units with fuel. In 1942, he became a member of the State Defense Committee in destruction of oil wells and oil-producing enterprises in the Caucasus. He utilized scorched earth tactics: in the time of the enemy's approach, all valuable equipment was demolished and sent back to the east of the country; stripped wells were immediately destroyed, but ones with significant productivity were continually used and only wrecked in the certainty of their seizure by the enemies. As a result, Germans were unable to use the resources of Krasnodar oil fields. Later, Baibakov became a representative of the State Defense Committee in relocation of oilmen and equipment of the Caucasian regions to the East. In 1941, The State Defense Committee decided to relocate parts of the oil enterprises of Baku, evacuate residents, and reorganize transportation flows. According to Baibakov, "A Great Resettlement of Baku oilmen is happening". More than 10,000 people were sent to Krasnovodsk with their families and oil equipment on steamships and tankers, then further ferried on to un-populated regions by trains.

Equipment, specialists and their families were sent to "The second Baku" districts (Bashkortostan, Samara and Perm Oblasts) for creation of new oil enterprises and factories there. So, the "Krasniy Proletariy" factory of oil engineering industry of Baku was transferred to Sterlitamak, the Myasnikov factory to Perm, the Dzerjinski factory to Sarapul, and the Stalin State Engineering Plant of the Union to Ishimbay. In autumn, the "Azneftrazvedka" trust was transferred to the Volga Region and A. F. Rustambeyov, a prominent oilman of Azerbaijan, was engaged in the organization of its activity in the new place.

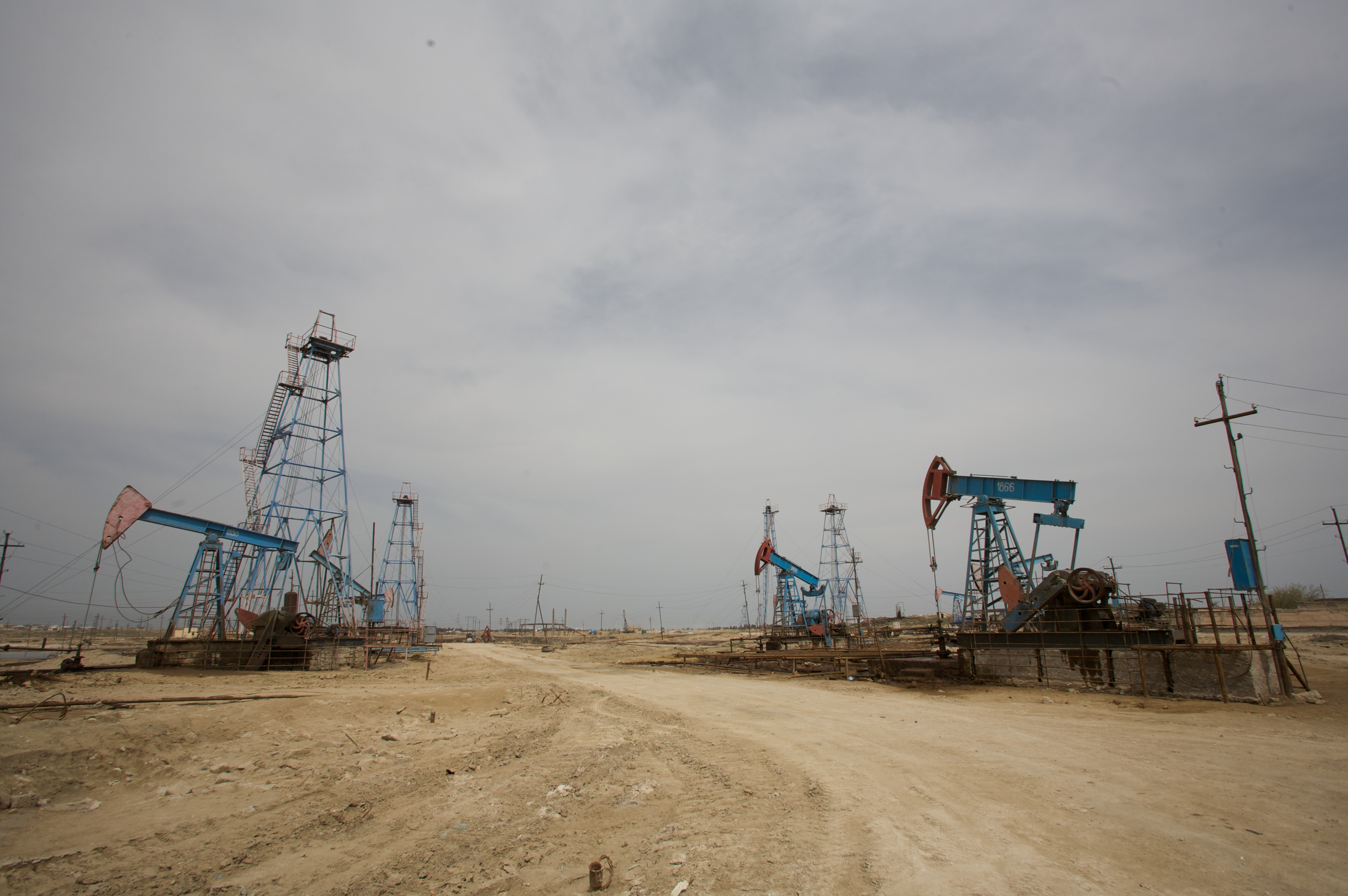
Modern oil fields of Azerbaijan

In 1942, by the order of the State Defense Committee, oil refining in Baku was to be stopped to produce various kinds of other products, in order to direct the goals of the region to the provision of aircraft with ultimate gasoline. 13 million of 17 million oil products produced were produced in Azerbaijan. Approximately 85% of aviation gasoline was produced in Azerbaijan. 1 million tons of B-78 high-octane gasoline was delivered to the front. Terminal stations, which were located on the shore of the Caspian Sea and The Volga River, and other great population aggregates, and which adjoined railway roads, were created. Transportation of oil and oil products from Baku to petroleum storage depots and to oil refineries of various regions of the country was implemented through the sea and then by railway roads.

In July 1942 navigation in the Volga was stopped due to the entrance of German troops into Volgograd. The main railway roads along which oil and oil products were sent from Baku to the front were blocked by German troops, who were now at the gates of the Caucasus. They tended to Baku petroleum and Baku itself was under the threat of seizure. As the direct road for oil transportation was blocked, a new way for transportation of oil products to Stalingrad had to be found. It was decided to send oil products through Krasnovodsk, and then through the railroads of Middle Asia and Kazakhstan to Stalingrad. However, there were not enough cisterns in the railroads of Central Asia for the transportation of the oil, so the Baku administration of the sector decided to send cisterns of oil products afloat by tugs to Krasnovodsk along the Caspian sea and then to the railroad from there.

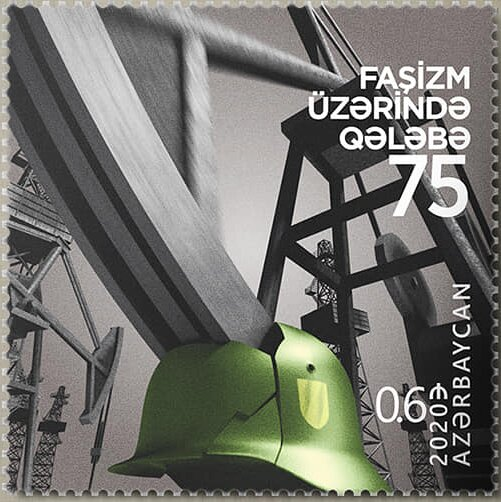
Stamp of Azerbaijan (2020). 75th Anniversary of the End of World War II.

In September, 1942 a military situation was announced in the South Caucasus and the situation in Baku became critical. Only 1.6 million tons of oil were sent instead of the 6 million tons stored until the end of navigation. Special oil wells, into which were pumped hundreds of thousands of tons of topped oil, were allocated. Scarcity of tanks led to the collapse of work. "Neftchala" was the only trust which produced petroleum in autumn. As N.K.Baibakov wrote:

"Moreover, the true heroism was achieved, also, due to the dedication of Azerbaijani people, who worked all day in oil production. Four Soviet aircraft, tanks and trucks used during the Second World War were produced in Baku. Military machine of the Soviet Union was put in motion for 75–80% thanks to valorous work of Baku citizens. Destiny of the war depended on them in many things. Being a non-frontline city, the capital of Azerbaijan was hourly connected with acting units of the Red Army with its oil arteries, as a frontline part of its fronts."

On April 28, 1945 Fyodor Tolbukhin, marshal of the Soviet Union in his article under a subtitle of "Glory to Azerbaijani nation" wrote:

"The Red Army owes Azerbaijani nation and courageous Baku oilmen for many victories, for on-time delivery of qualitative fuel to attacking units. Soldiers of our front under Stalingrad, in Don and Donbass, on the shores of the Dnepr and Dnestr, in Belgrad, under Budapesht and Vienna remember Azerbaijani oilmen with gratitude and greet brave workers of oily Baku."

== Effects of the war ==
In total, roughly 600,000 – 800,000 Azerbaijani troops fought for the Soviet Union. That is approximately one fifth of the entire population in 1941. Azerbaijan needed a large workforce to operate machinery and produce oil for the Soviet offensive against the Axis. Midway through the war, women and those unable to fight made up a large portion of the workforce; in fact, women alone made up 33% of the employees working in the oilfields. That number grew even more in 1944, as more of the population went to the front lines – where women made up 60% of the oil personnel, along with veterans and the elderly.

In February 1942, the Central Inquiry Office under the Soviet of Evacuation carried out a general census of the number of internal refugees that fled Azerbaijan to the rest of the USSR. The census reported that 2745 people in total were evacuated from the Zagatala, Beylagan, Imishli, and Bilasuvar regions of the Azerbaijan SSR, among which 2545 were Jews, 114 Russians, 65 Ukrainians, 15 Poles, along with some Armenians, Tatars, Moldovans, and Georgians. The 1942 census also showed the number of refugees coming to the Gorodskoy and Dzherjinski regions of Baku before February, 1942. These refugees included 387 Russians, 386 Jews, 168 Ukrainians, 73 Armenians, 5 Georgians, 7 Azerbaijanis, 11 Poles, 8 Tatars, and a minority citizens from other nations.

Azerbaijani stamps dedicated to Second World War

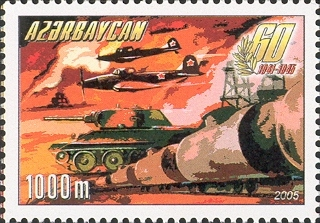
2005

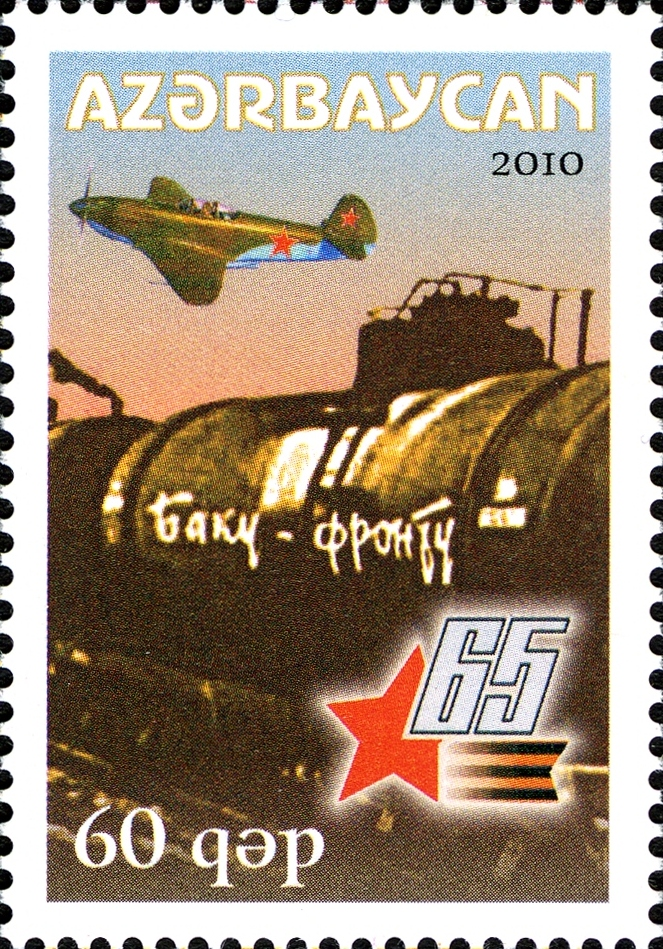
2010

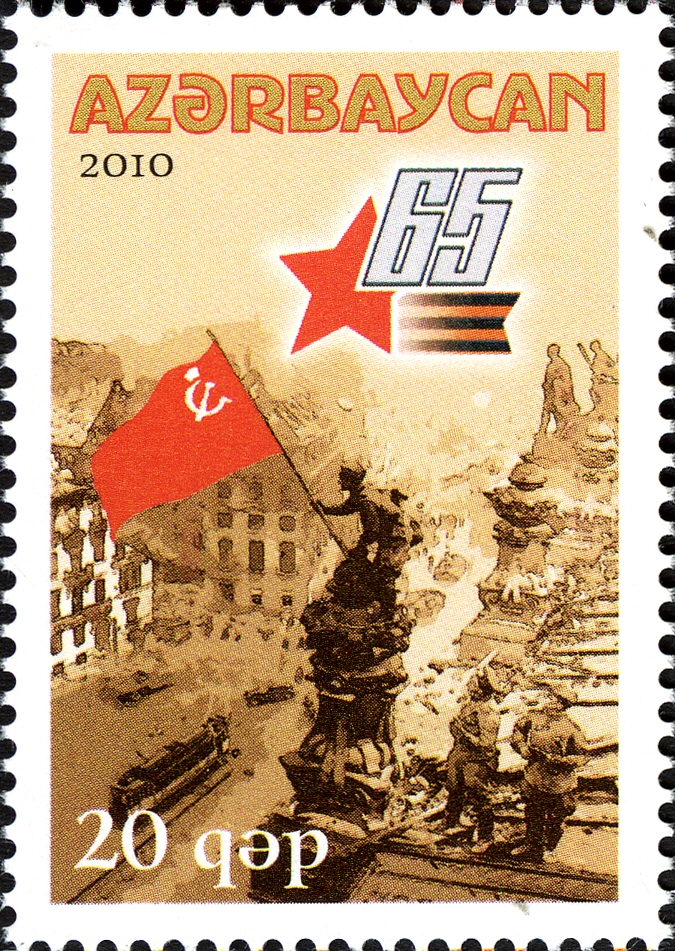
2010

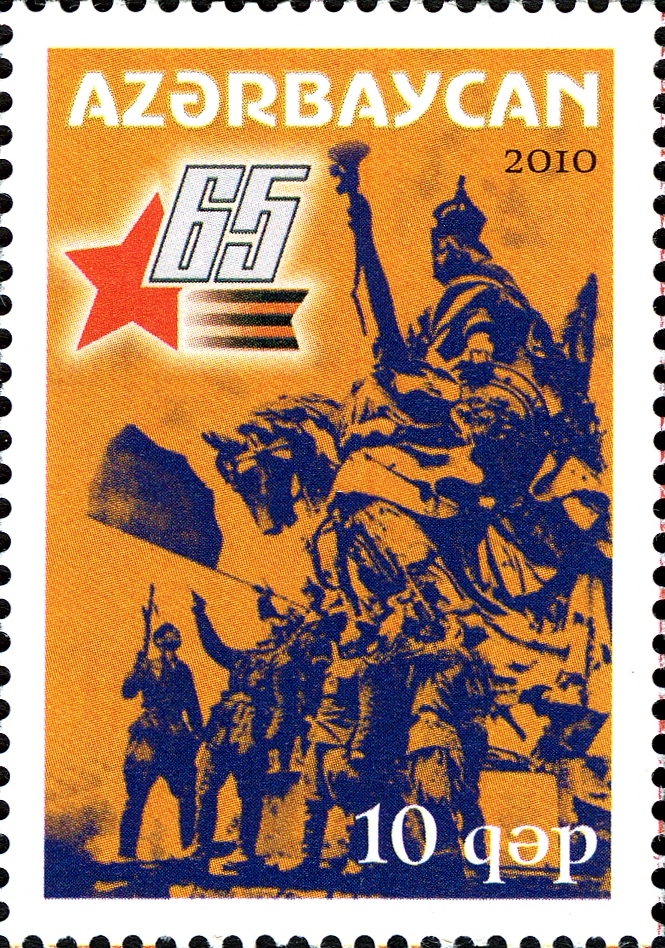
2010
