= Çaparlı =

Çaparlı or Chaparly may refer to:

- Çaparlı, Agsu, Azerbaijan
- Çaparlı, Shamkir, Azerbaijan
