= Novxanı =

Novkhany Novxanı
- Municipality
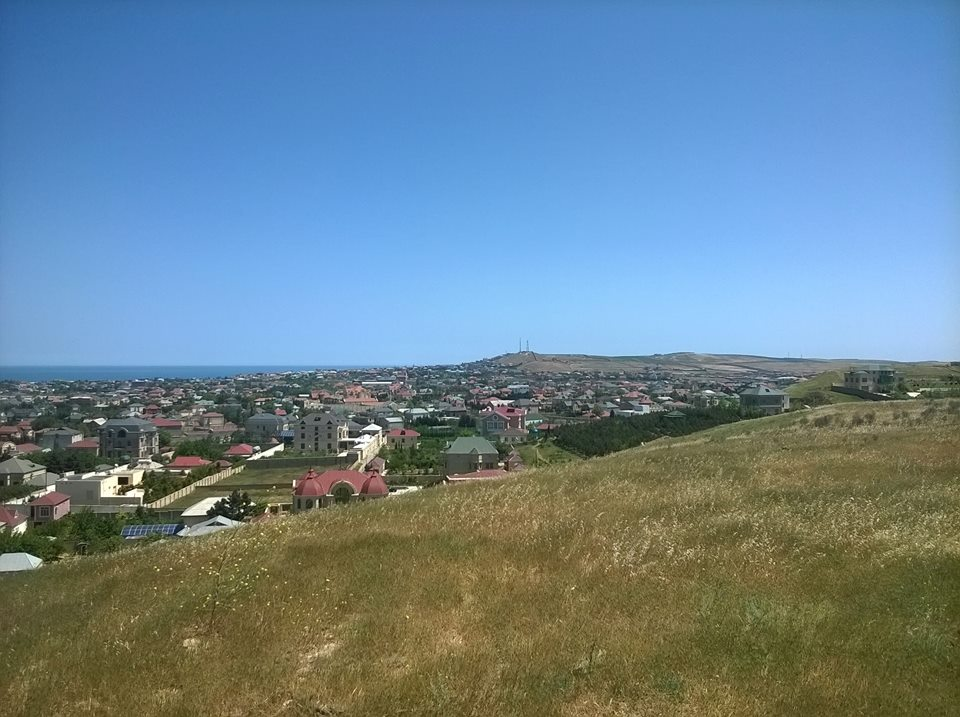

- Location within Azerbaijan
- Coordinates: 40°31′47″N 49°46′46″E
- Country: Azerbaijan
- District: Absheron

Population
  - Total: 4,468
- Time zone: UTC+4 (AZT)
  - Summer (DST): UTC+5 (AZT)

Novxanı (also, Novkhany, Novkhana, Novxana, and Nobkhana) is a village and municipality in the Absheron District of Azerbaijan. It has a population of 4,468. The name means new house in Persian language.

== Notable natives ==
- Azim Azimzade — painter and graphic artist, founder of Azerbaijani satirical graphics, People's Artist of Azerbaijan SSR (1927).
- Lotfi A. Zadeh — American mathematician, electrical engineer, computer scientist, founder of the theory of fuzzy sets and fuzzy logic.
- Mahammad Amin Rasulzade — statesman, scholar, public figure and one of the founders of Azerbaijan Democratic Republic, the chairman of the Azerbaijani National Council (1918).

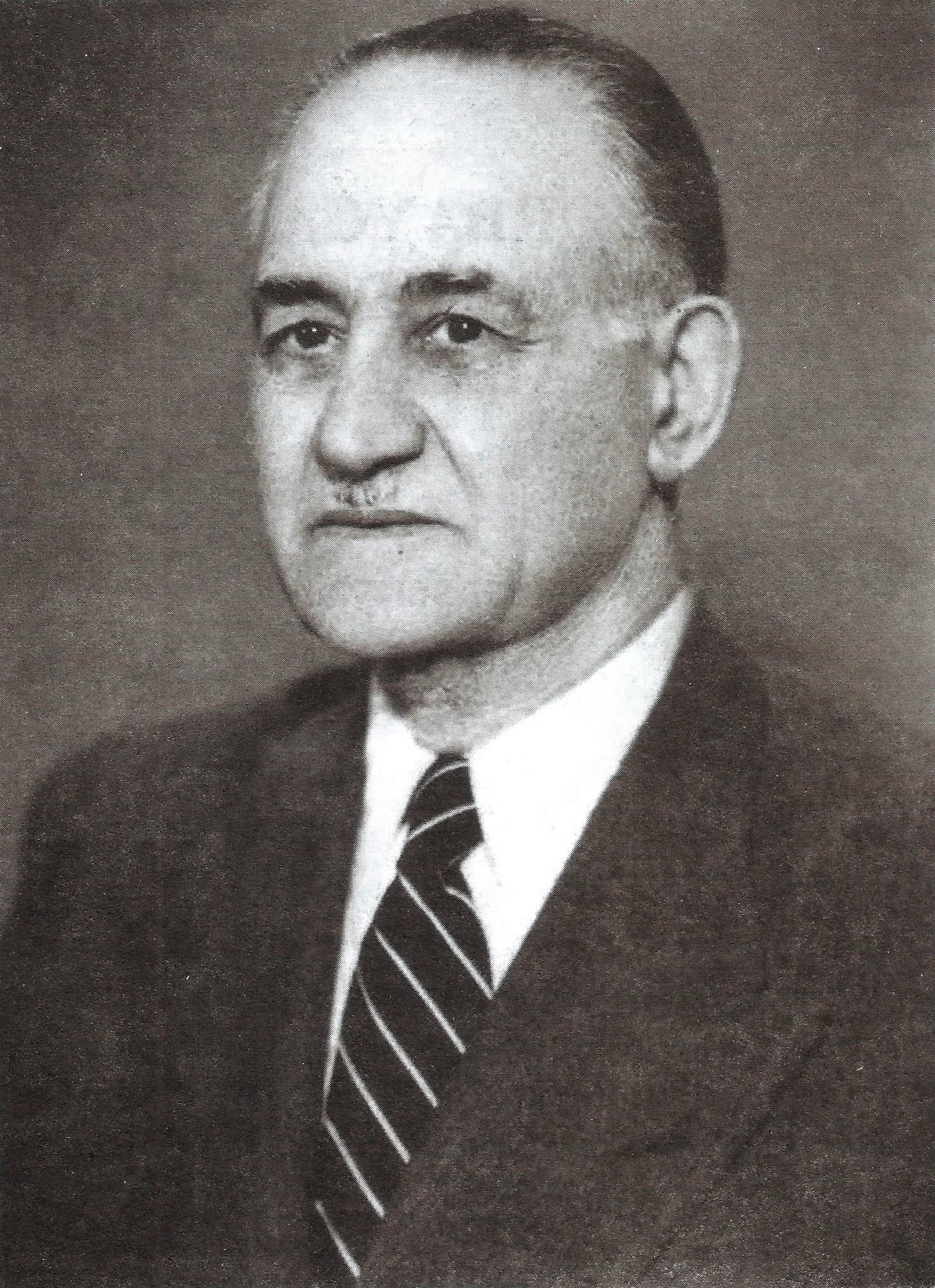
Mahammad Amin Rasulzade

- Mehdi Huseynzade — legendary guerrilla fighter in Yugoslavia and Italy during World War II, Hero of the Soviet Union.
- Sabit Orujov — 31 May 1912 – 20 April 1981) was an Azerbaijani and Soviet politician.
- Suleyman Rustam — poet, the People's Poet of Azerbaijan SSR (1960).

== Transportation ==
The village is served by the Baku suburban railway.

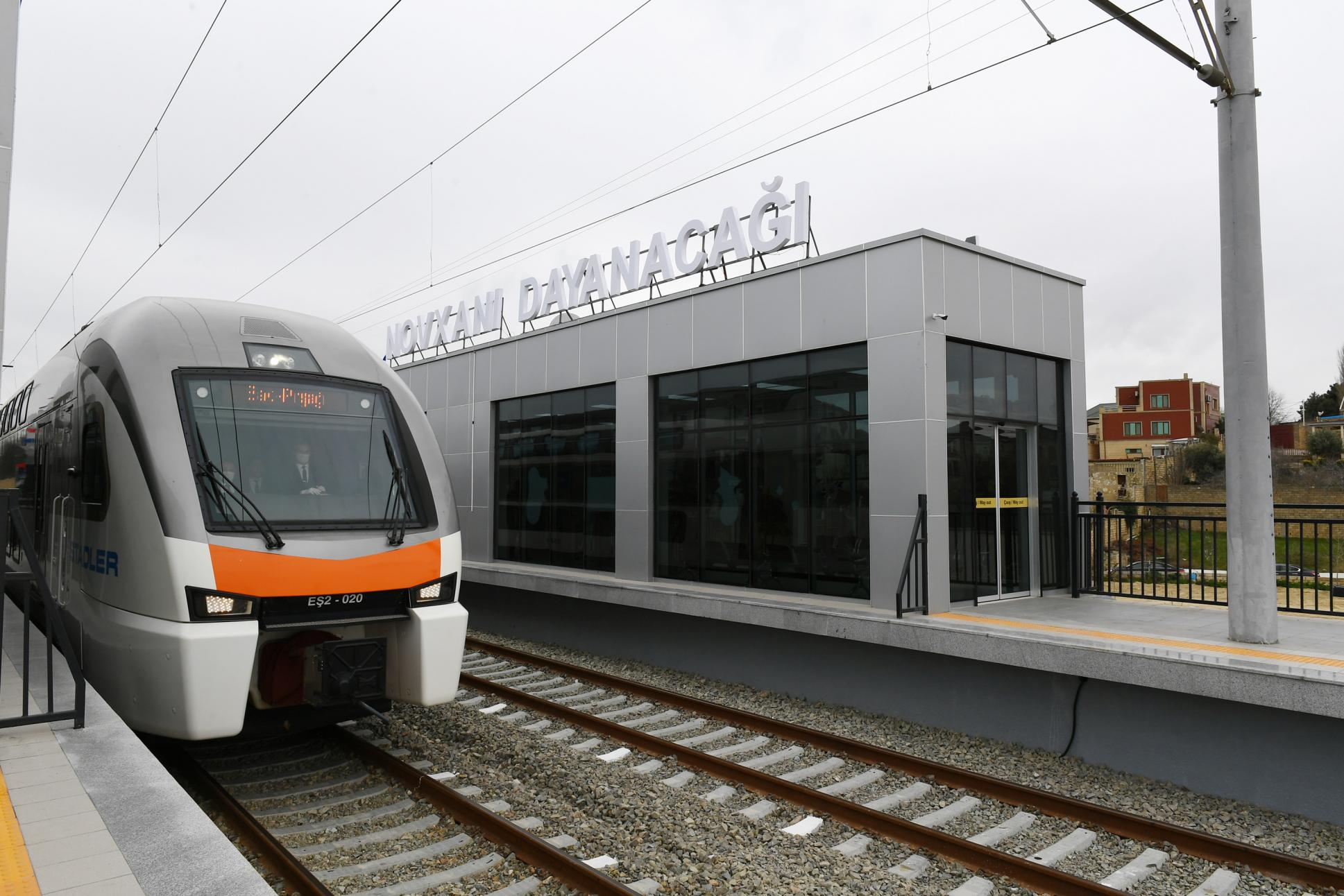
Novkhani Station (Pirshaghi-Goradil-Novkhani-Sumgayit section of Absheron circular railway after renovation)

== Gallery ==
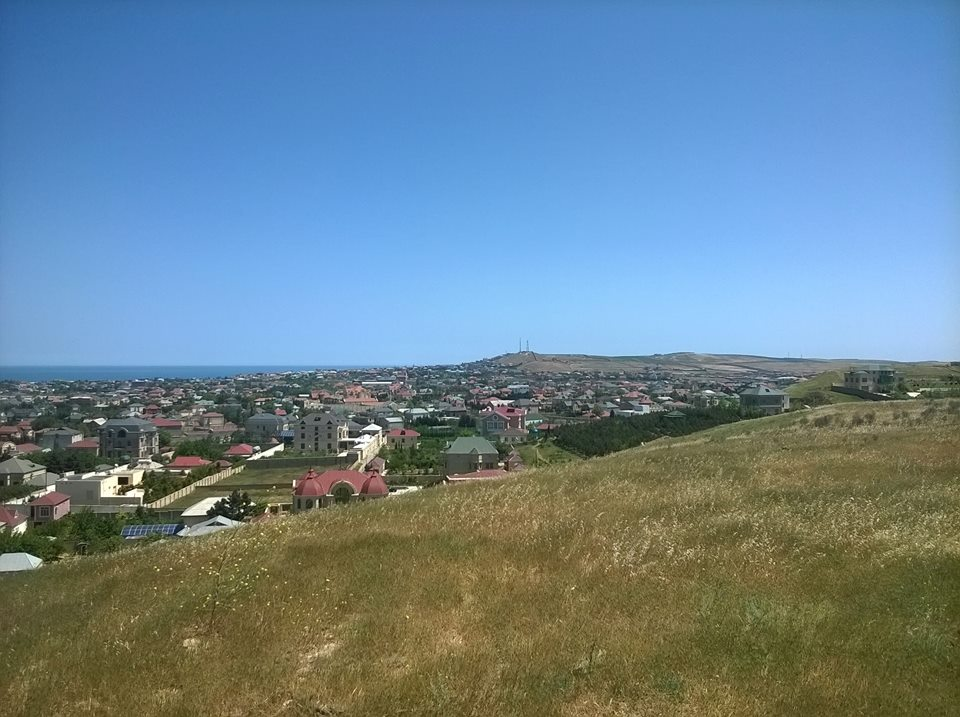
Keçəldağ-(Novkhanı)

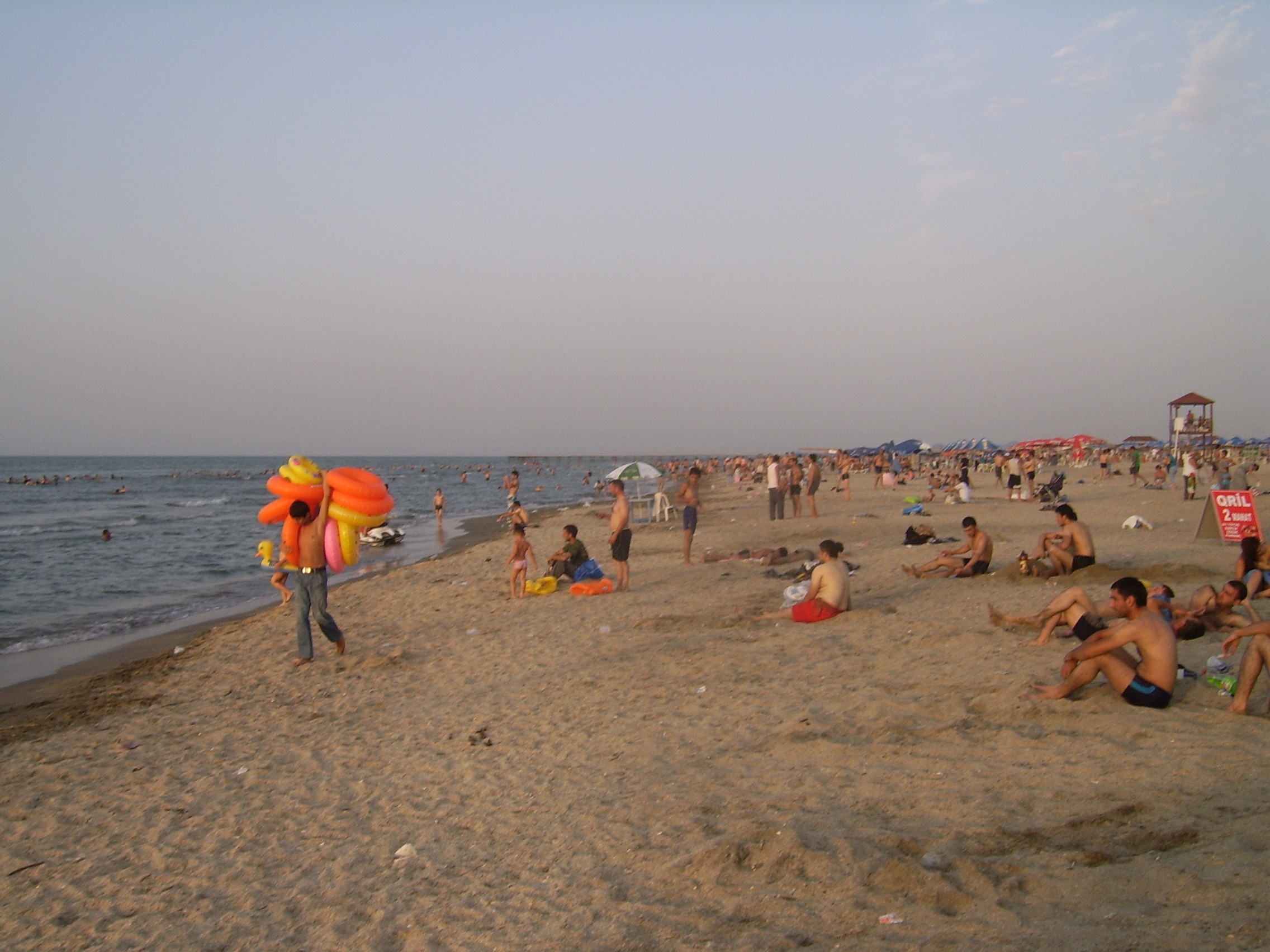

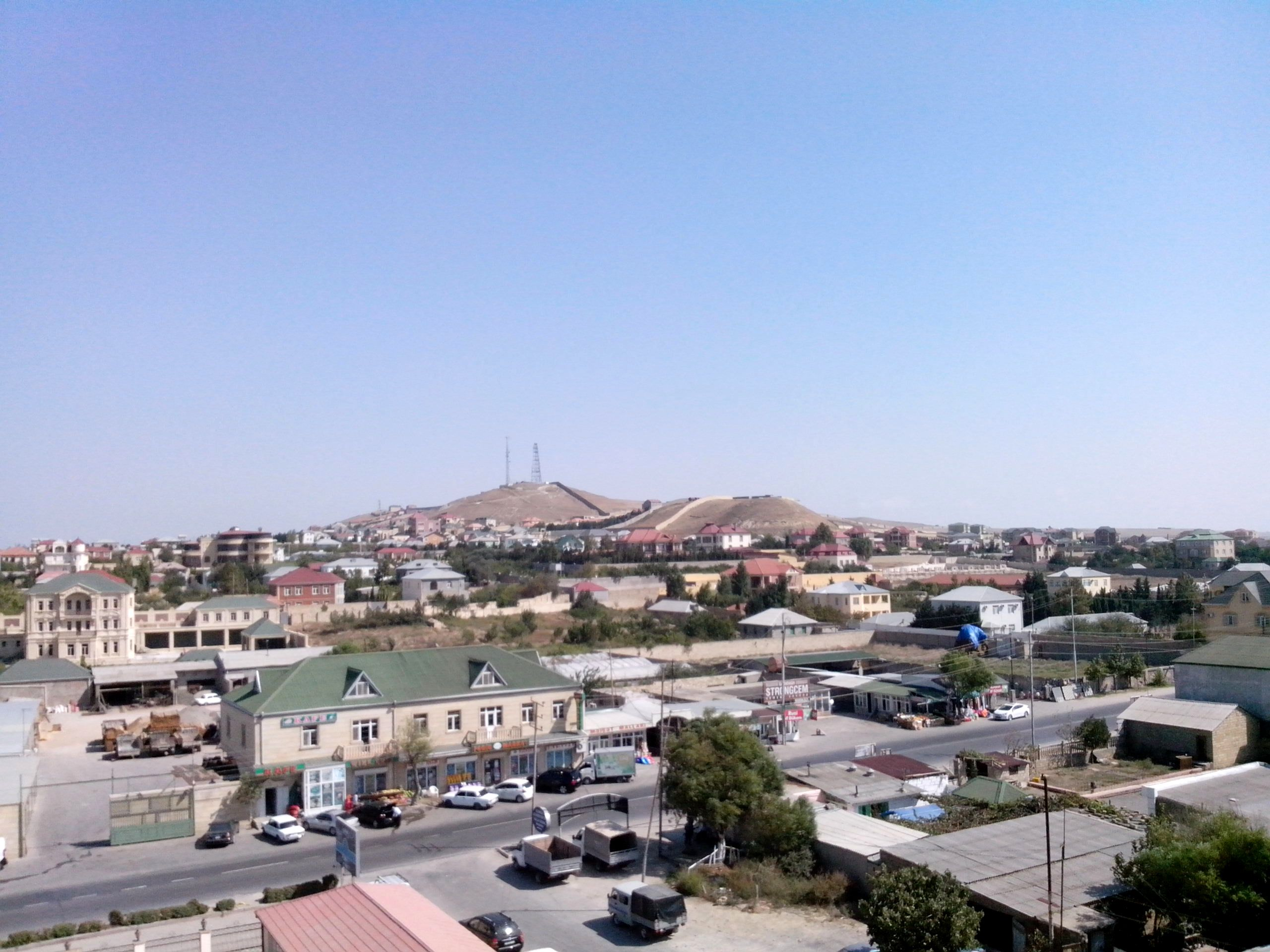

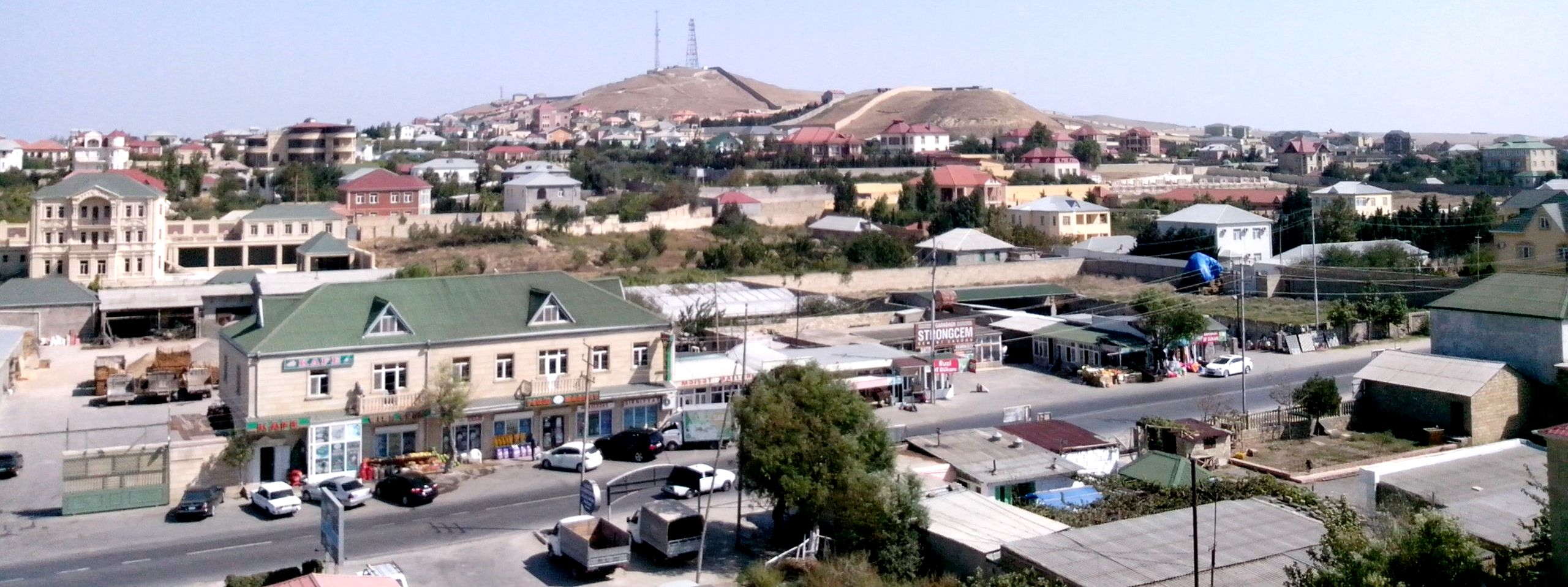

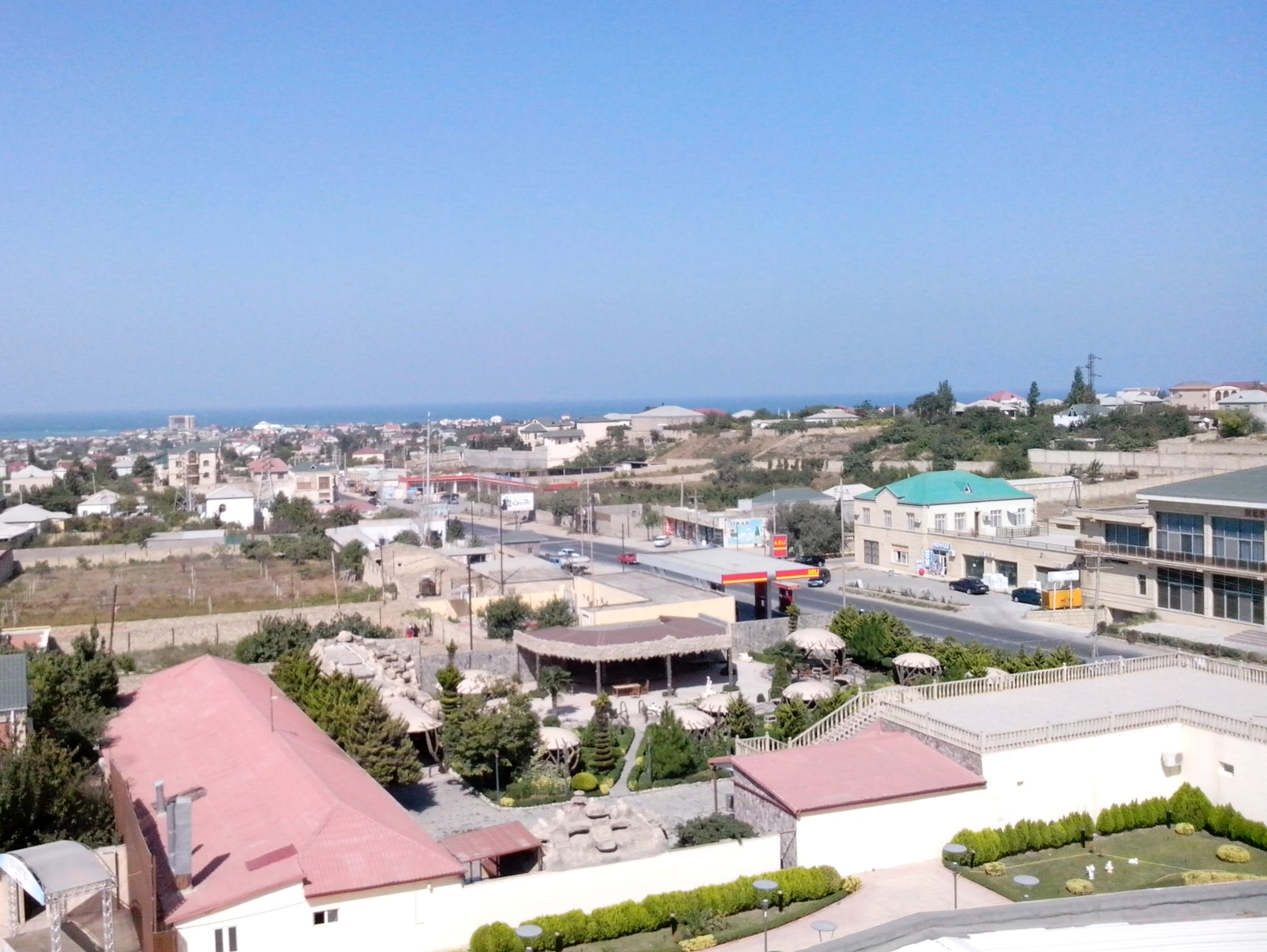

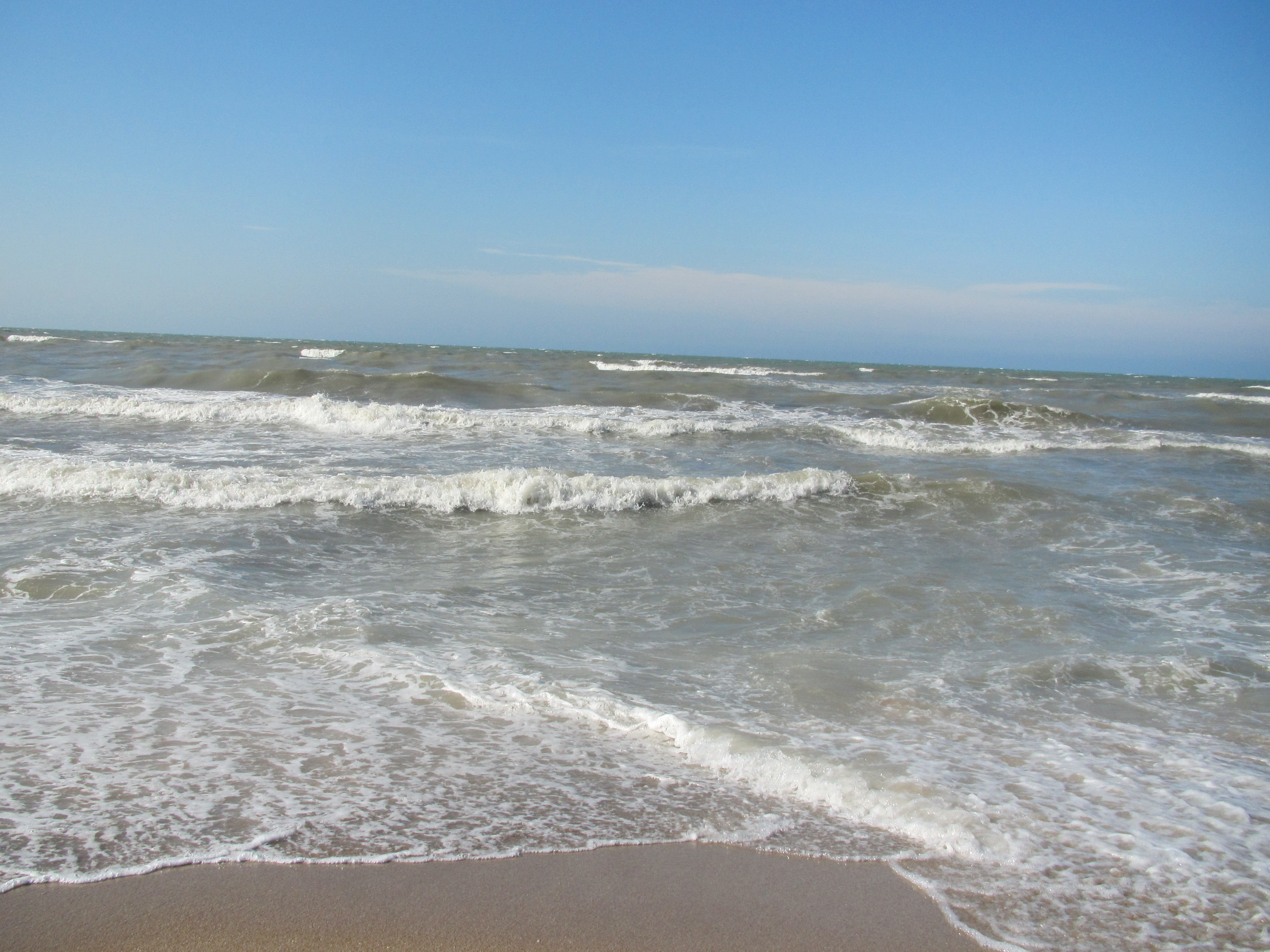
