= Israfil Mammadov =

Azerbaijani Red Army lieutenant (1919–1946)

Israfil Maharram oglu Mamedov
- Born: 30 May 1919; Chaparly, Shamkir, Azerbaijan Democratic Republic
- Died: 1 May 1946 (aged 26); Yalta, Soviet Union
- Military career
- Allegiance: Soviet Union
- Branch: Red Army
- Service years: 1939–1945
- Rank: Lieutenant
- Unit: 180th Rifle Division
- Conflicts: World War II
- Awards: Hero of the Soviet Union

Israfil Maharram oglu Mamedov (or Mammadov, Azerbaijani: İsrafil Məhərrəm oğlu Məmmədov, Azeri Cyrillic: Исрафил Məhəррəм oғлу Мəммəдов, Russian: Исрафил Магеррам оглы Мамедов; 30 May 1919 – 5 May 1946) was an Azerbaijani Red Army lieutenant and a Hero of the Soviet Union. He was the assistant commander of a platoon of the Soviet 42nd Rifle Regiment during World War II. He was the first Azerbaijani to be awarded the title of Hero of the Soviet Union, on 11 December 1941. Mammadov was awarded the title for reportedly killing 70 German soldiers and three officers.

== Early life ==
Mammadov was born on 16 March 1919 in Chaparly to a peasant family. He graduated from the Kirovabad Industrial College. He worked at a textile mill. Mammadov volunteered for the Red Army in 1939.

== World War II ==
Mamedov received the rank of Senior Sergeant and fought in military operations on the Northwestern Front as an assistant platoon leader in the 42nd Rifle Regiment of the 180th Rifle Division. He joined the Communist Party of the Soviet Union in 1941. Mammadov fought in battles around Novgorod. He led 20 soldiers in defending the command post and communication line near Pustynka settlement in the Novgorod Oblast. His troops were cut off from the main Soviet forces. After the artillery preparation the Germans commenced a new attack, assuming that the Soviet forces were weakened. Understanding their strategy, Mammadov ordered his troops to hold fire, allowing the enemy to get within 10–15 meters. After three German assaults, he launched a counter-attack with bayonets. The Germans lost over 300 soldiers and retreated. Mammadov personally killed approximately 70 enemy troops, including three officers. For his actions, Mammadov was awarded the title Hero of the Soviet Union and the Order of Lenin on 11 December 1941 from Pavel Kurochkin. He was the first Azerbaijani to receive the title.

== Post-war ==
In 1943, Mammadov was medically retired. He lived in Kirovabad, working in the Azerbaijan Komsomol Central Committee. He died on 1 May 1946 in a military hospital in Yalta and was buried in Kirovabad.

== Personal life ==
Mammadov married Yevdokia Ivanovna and had two daughters, Galina and Svetlana.

== Legacy ==
A street in Ganja was named after Mammadov, and a museum and monument were built in the same place. A school in Ganja was named after him, as well as a school in Chaparly.
