= Suleyman Rustam =

Soviet and Azerbaijani poet, playwright and translator

- Süleyman Rüstəm
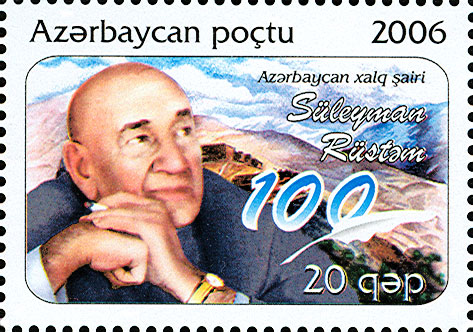
- A stamp of Azerbaijan dedicated to Rustam
- Born: 12 March 1906; Novxanı, Baku uezd, Baku Governorate, Russian Empire
- Died: 10 June 1989 (aged 83); Baku, Azerbaijan SSR, Soviet Union
- Education: Moscow State University
- Occupations: Poet, playwright, translator

Suleyman Rustam (Azerbaijani: Süleyman Rüstəm; 12 March 1906 – 10 June 1989) was a Soviet and Azerbaijani poet, playwright and translator.

== Biography ==
Suleyman Rustam was born on in Novxanı village in family of a blacksmith.

He studied at Russo-Tatar school until the revolution. Suleyman Rustam wrote that, Suleyman Sani Akhundov, who was the headmaster and pedagogue at the school, evoked his interest to literature and such famous pedagogues as M.Vezirov, R.Tahirov and A.Israfilbeyli strengthened this interest. He thereafter entered Baku Electric Technical School and then the eastern faculty of Baku State University where his classmates were Jafar Jabbarly, Afrasiyab Badalbeyli, Vali Khuluflu and was taught by such pedagogue as the eminent writer Abdurrahim bey Hagverdiyev.

In 1929, Suleyman Rustam continued his education at the faculty of literature and arts of Moscow State University. From 1937, he worked as a chairman of Azerbaijan State Academic Drama Theatre named after Mashadi Azizbeyov. He was the deputy of all convocations of the Soviet Parliament of Azerbaijan and from 1971 till 1989 he was the chairman of Supreme Soviet of the Azerbaijan SSR. Suleyman Rustam was not only a poet, but he was also a translator and a literary man. He translated works of Ivan Krylov, Alexander Griboyedov, Alexander Pushkin, Mikhail Lermontov, Nikolay Nekrasov and others into his native language. Suleyman Rustam's works were translated into many languages of the world, and also into Russian.

Rustam worked as a chief editor of "Edebiyyat qazeti" ("Literature newspaper").

He died in Baku, and was buried in the Alley of Honor.

== Memory ==
- In 2006, a stamp of Azerbaijan dedicated to Suleyman Rustam was released.
- A memorial plate was fixed in his honor in Baku.

== Creativity ==
His first collection of poems, "From sadness to happiness", written in 1927, was dedicated to Komsomol, civil war, courage of soldiers struggling for the Soviet power, as other poems of the poet, written in the 1920s ("Partisan Ali", "Armless hero").

The main theme of his works, created in the 1930s ("Romanticism of a night"), was the creation of romanticism of a collective work, attracting spiritual enrichment of people. "A good comrade" poem was dedicated to labor feats of cotton growers in Mugham steppes. In 1939-1940s, S.Rustam wrote "Qachaq Nebi" novel. The poet used folk proverbs about Qachaq Nebi, expanded and deepened them socially and historically, gave a social perception to the novel. The main heroes of the novel are Qachaq Nebi - a famous leader of the national movement of the 19th century and Hejer - his brave wife and fellow fighter.

Nebi, the son of a poor peasant, working as a farm laborer at bey, didn't bear the cruelty and rudeness of his master and ran to the mountains and became "qachaq" (fugitive). He assembled dissatisfied peasants around him, vengeance for outraged people, took away money and commodities from the rich and gave them to the poor. He was supported by the whole neighborhood and courageously opposed tsar officers and gendarme and kept day-laborers in awe for a long time. And "noble brigand" Nebi's revolt was also collapsed as every spontaneous peasant struggle.

Patriotic poems ("A day will come", "To the sons of Azerbaijan", "Old man's answer") written during the Great Patriotic War were dedicated to the bravery and selflessness of the Soviet people, their unshakeable belief and victory over the enemy. Suleyman Rustam's "Mother and a postman" poem had a great fame (1942). Mother waiting for news from his front-line soldier son for four months says the postman: "If there is not any letter for me…don't come here again!" The disappointed postman goes away, but he is not offended, he is distressed by the sufferings of the old mother. In her turn, mother also regrets for her action. Finally, the postman brings a long-awaited letter and the postman and the whole neighborhood rejoices at the mother's happiness. This poem, written with a great emotional strength, deeply excites a reader and evokes his heartwarming feelings.

During the postwar times the poet wrote a collection of poems called "Two shores", dedicated to hard life of Azerbaijani paupers in Iran and postwar flourishing of the Soviet Azerbaijan. Image of hero Qafur Mammadov, who shielded his commander from enemies by his chest, was created in "Qafur's heart" poem.

== Works ==
- "From sadness to happiness" (1927)
- "Armless hero" (1928)
- "A good comrade" (1933)
- "Star" (1934)
- "Romanticism of a night" (1940)
- "Mother's heart" (1942)
- "Cranes" (1942)
- "A day will come" (1943)
- "Mother and a postman" (1942)
- "Two shores" (1949)
- "Gafur's heart" (1950)
- "Songs of life" (1958)
- "Word about a Russian brother" (1960)
- "On sunny shores" (1963)
- "Spring reflections" (1964)
- "A little bit about love" (1966)

== Awards and premiums ==
- Honored Art Worker of the Azerbaijan SSR (1943)
- Stalin Prize, 2nd class (1950) – for collection of poems "Two shores" (1949)
- People's Poet of the Azerbaijan SSR (1960)
- Hero of Socialist Labour (1976)
- Order of Friendship of Peoples (1984)
- Three Orders of Lenin
- Two Orders of the Red Banner of Labour
