= Javad Hakimli =

- Born: October 20, 1914; Lyambyali, Noyemberyan region, Armenia SSR
- Died: February 27, 2006 (aged 91); Baku, Republic of Azerbaijan
- Military career
- Allegiance: USSR; SFR Yugoslavia
- Rank: Senior Lieutenant
- Nickname: Акимов (Akimov)
- Unit: 9th Corps of Yugoslav Partisans
- Commands: 1st "Russian company" (Ruska četa) of the 1st Battalion of the 3rd Slovenian Brigade
- Conflicts: Battle of Stalingrad; World War II in Yugoslavia

Senior Lieutenant Javad Hakimli was an Azerbaijani-Soviet guerrilla who commanded a Soviet POW battalion of the Yugoslav Partisans during World War II.

He is most noted for being the commander of Mehdi Huseynzade, a Hero of the Soviet Union whose military exploits he recounted after the war.

== Biography ==
=== Early years ===
Javad Hakimli was born on October 20, 1914, in the village of Lyambyali in the Noyemberyan region of the Armenian SSR.

He finished school in Tbilisi which was then the capital city of the Transcaucasian SFSR (which included Armenia, Azerbaijan, and Georgia) and continued his studies specializing in tobacco cultivation in the Crimean ASSR.

=== World War II ===
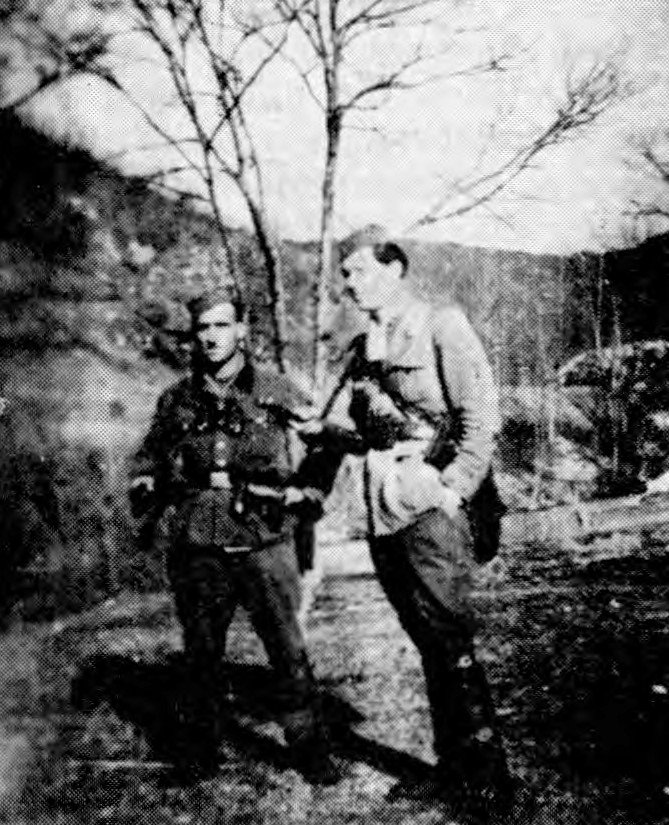
Javad Hakimli (left) with 1st "Russian company" commissioner Vinko Tomc

Javad, a graduate of the Tbilisi and Ordzhonikidze Military School, was sent to the Crimean Front in the initial days of the war. In 1942, in the Kalach District of Russia he was seriously wounded in battle and captured by the Wehrmacht, later receiving treatment in a hospital in Pryluky. Javad was soon transferred to Mirgorod, where he encountered fellow Soviet POW Mehdi Huseynzade.

Javad Hakimli spent one and a half year in the German POW camps in Northern Italy and Yugoslavia. In February 1944, Javad was near Trieste in the village of Vila Opicina and with fellow Soviet POWs Mehdi Huseynzade and Asad Gurbanov escaped into the Slovenian woods, where they joined up with the 9th Corps of the Yugoslav Partisans. Javad later took part in Vila Opicina's liberation in collaboration with Josip Broz Tito's army, where on May 3, 1945, he crossed the streets of the city with his companions.

=== Yugoslavia ===
Javad formed and became the commander of the 1st "Russian company" and Mehdi Huseynzade (Partisan pseudonym "Mikhailo") was appointed deputy commander for political affairs eventually to transition to a sabotage and reconnaissance role. According to the recollections of Hakimli, "Mehdi caused such fear that the Germans were even afraid to go out into the city alone", "it seemed to them that ‘Mikhailo’ was the name of a large detachment commanded by the hero".

Javad’s battalion quickly manifested their combat capability in March 1944, after an attack on the German-held town of Godovič, which was noted by the Yugoslav command as among the most distinguished. On 7th August 1944, on the decision of the command of the 9th Corps, the company was transferred to the 2nd "Russian" battalion of the 18th Slovene Brigade, in which its fighters fought until the end of the war.

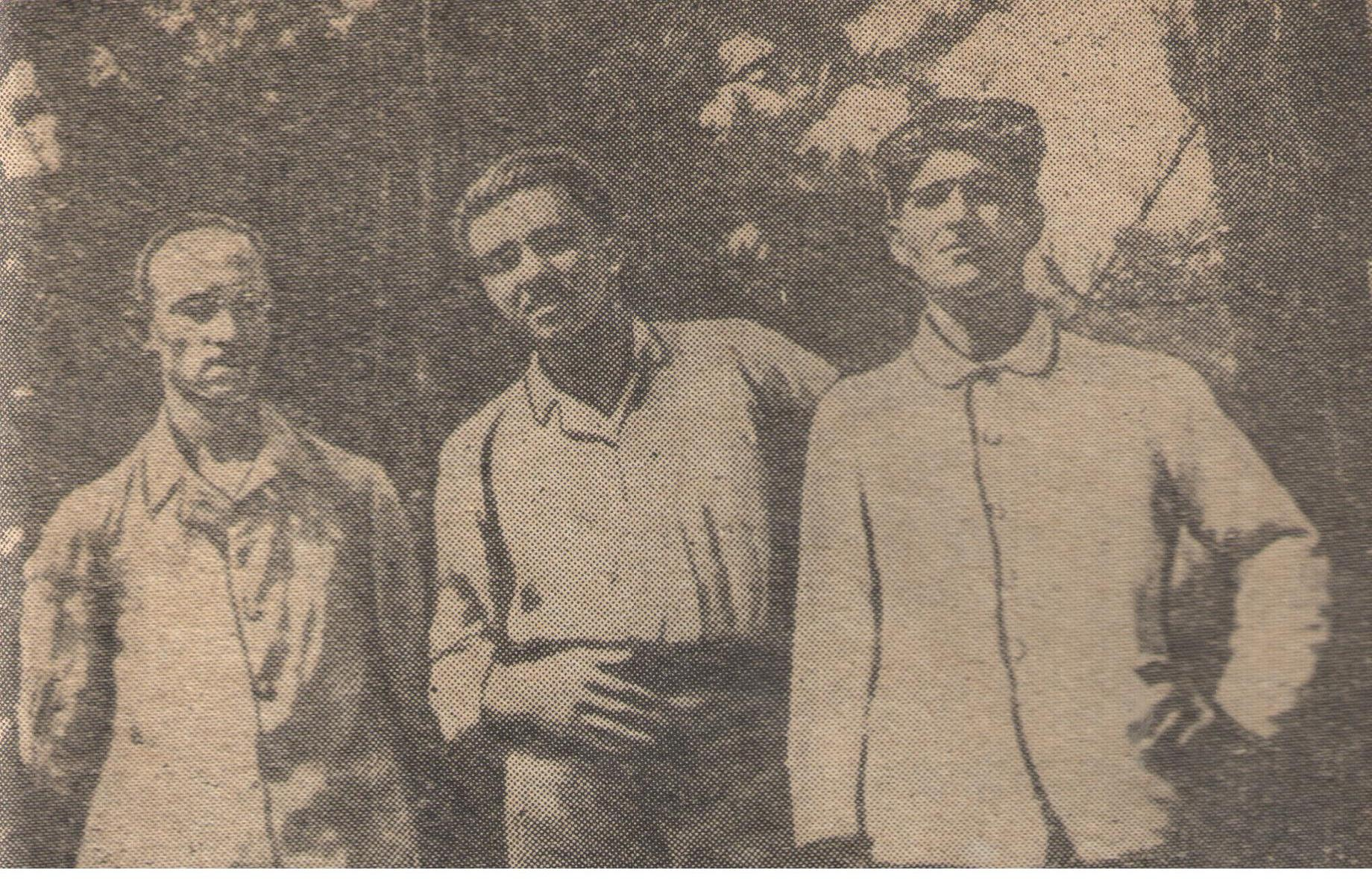
Javad Hakimli (right) with Mehdi Huseynzade (middle) in 1944

=== Death of Mehdi Huseynzade ===
Mehdi Huseynzade was killed in November 1944 in a village of Vitovlje in the Vipava Valley and was hastily buried by local residents. It was Javad Hakimli who insisted that "Mikhailo" be reburied according to Muslim custom with full honours. He personally washed Mehdi’s body, wrapped it in silk from a parachute in replacement of a shroud with his face directed towards Mecca. The first inscription on the homemade obelisk above Mehdi’s grave was carved by Javad himself.

Another Soviet Partisan of Georgian origin, David Tatuashvili, described the funeral as follows:

"The first monument in his honour was sculpted by Javad Hakimli, while I built the tomb despite the tears streaming down my face, I carved a star for Mikhailo".

=== After World War II ===
Yugoslav leader Josip Broz Tito honoured Javad with the "Order for Bravery" and the "Partisan of Yugoslavia".

Repatriated to Podolsk in the USSR in late 1945 he passed a background check and interrogation from the counter-intelligence unit SMERSH. According to Javad Hakimli, it was in Podolsk he personally wrote an alibi and description of Mehdi Huseynzadeh to the KGB archives of the SMERSH, so that Mehdi would not be considered a traitor or a defector. In 1957, the Supreme Soviet of the Soviet Union posthumously awarded the title of Hero of the Soviet Union to Mehdi Huseynzade.

After demobilisation in December 1946, Javad first went to Baku to notify the family of Mehdi Huseynzade of his exploits in Yugoslavia and to hand over his personal belongings (jacket, silver cigarette case, ring, pocket Franco-Russian dictionary, etc.). He later returned to his village in Lyambyali in the Armenian SSR.

=== Later years ===
In 1963, Javad published a book in Yerevan entitled ‘Intiqam’ (Revenge), about Mehdi Huseynzade’s military feats and the Partisan war in Yugoslavia.

From 1989, he lived with his family in Baku, was a member of the Veterans Council and met with young people to share his war experiences.

In an interview in 1998, "My character was very difficult from my youth," Javad Hakimli recollected, "I hardly met people, but Mehdi for some reason fell in love with me brotherly. He became attached to me with his heart and soul. Do you know how I protect it? He did not allow him to risk himself once more, every time he worried, worried when Mehdi was going to another task or subversive action. Sometimes he and I knew about his future diversionary acts. I frequently changed passwords, for example, today the password was ‘Sun over the Adriatic’, and tomorrow: ‘On the coast - a gusty wind’".

In October 2004, Javad Hakimli celebrated his 90th birthday at a Baku restaurant amongst members of Mehdi Huseynzade's and his own family in addition to the Slovenian Consul in Baku, Borut Megushar who conveyed his congratulations on behalf of Slovenia for Javad's personal contributions to the war effort with greetings from the surviving Slovenian Partisans and veterans of the war. Javad Hakimli died in Baku on February 27, 2006.
