= Aliya Rustambeyova =

Azerbaijani female physician

- Aliyə Rüstəmbəyova
- Born: December 2, 1907; Shusha, Russian Empire
- Died: 1942 (aged 34–35)
- Education: Azerbaijan Medical University, First Medical Institute of Leningrad
- Occupations: physician, partisan

Aliya Rustambeyova was an Azerbaijani female physician and a partisan of the Eastern Front during the Second World War.

== Biography ==
=== Early years and career ===
Rustambeyova was born on December 2, 1907 in Shusha. She moved to Baku with her parents and received her secondary education at Secondary School No. 3. Rustambeyova was admitted to the Azerbaijan Medical Institute, then continued her education at the First Medical Institute of Leningrad. In 1935, she graduated with a distinction diploma. She worked as a physician at one of the hospitals of "Chirkikstroy" in Uzbekistan for three years. In 1938, she was invited to Moscow as an experienced physician-therapist, where she worked at the Institute for the Advanced Training of Physicians, conducting scientific research.

=== World War II ===
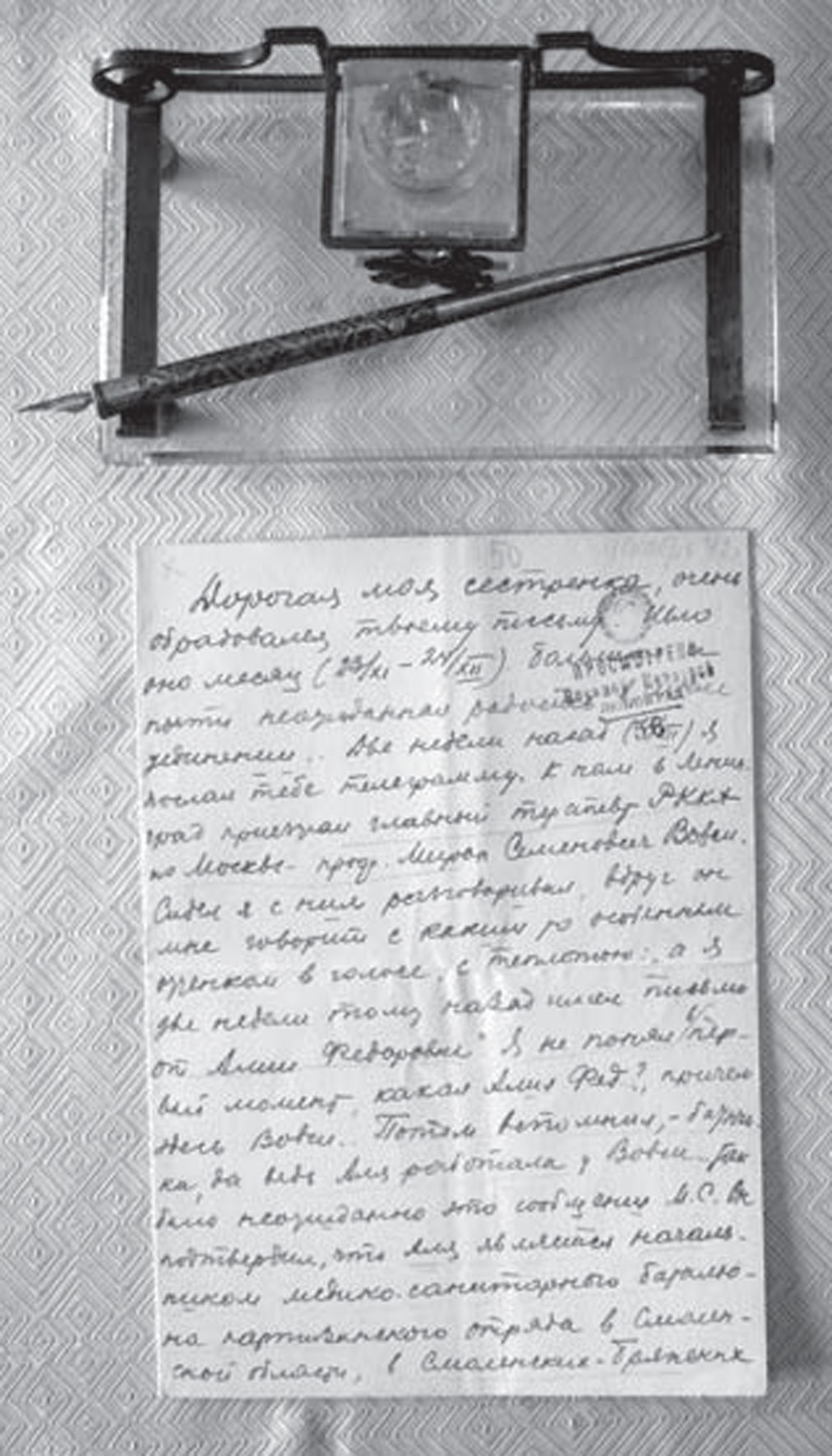
Aliya Rustambeyova's inkwell and silver pen, National Museum of History of Azerbaijan

On November 30, 1939, the Soviet Union initiated a war against Finland. Rustambeyova participated in this war as a physician and served in military medical service in Karelia. After the war ended on March 12, 1940, she returned to Moscow and continued her work as a physician at the S.P. Botkin Clinic for Internal Medicine. However, on June 22, 1941, following Germany's attack on the Soviet Union, Rustambeyova was once again sent to serve in military medical service. She served as a physician-therapist in the therapeutic department of Field Hospital 214, Sanitary Directorate of the 3rd Army, in the Bryansk forests near Moscow.

In October 1941, her 214th Mobile Field Hospital became surrounded in the area near the settlement of Vidnoye. In December, during an attempt to break through to their own forces, she was wounded and captured near the city of Vyazma. While in captivity, she served as a doctor in a hospital for prisoners of war in the village of Lopatino, Vyazemsky District.

In February 1942, she escaped with a group of wounded individuals. She joined the partisans of the 1st Partisan Rifle Division titled "Dedushka" under the command of the partisan movement of the Smolensk Region and became the head of the unit's medical service.

On June 30, 1942, she was severely wounded and could not be evacuated. She is still considered missing.

== Legacy ==
Azerbaijani poet Mirvarid Dilbazi wrote the poem "Partisan Aliya" (1972), and sculptor Aslan Rustamov created a bust-portrait of Aliya (1962).

Photos, documents and letters related to Aliya Rustambeyova, and her inkwell and silver pen are preserved in the National Museum of History of Azerbaijan.
