= Çaparlı, Agsu =

Çaparlı
- Municipality
- Location within Azerbaijan
- Coordinates: 40°30′52″N 48°27′27″E
- Country: Azerbaijan
- Rayon: Agsu

Population
  - Total: 773
- Time zone: UTC+4 (AZT)
  - Summer (DST): UTC+5 (AZT)

Çaparlı (also, Chaparly) is a village and municipality in the Agsu Rayon of Azerbaijan. It has a population of 773.
