= Mehdi Huseynzade Monument =

Azerbaijani World War II monument

- Azerbaijani: Mehdi Hüseynzadənin heykəli
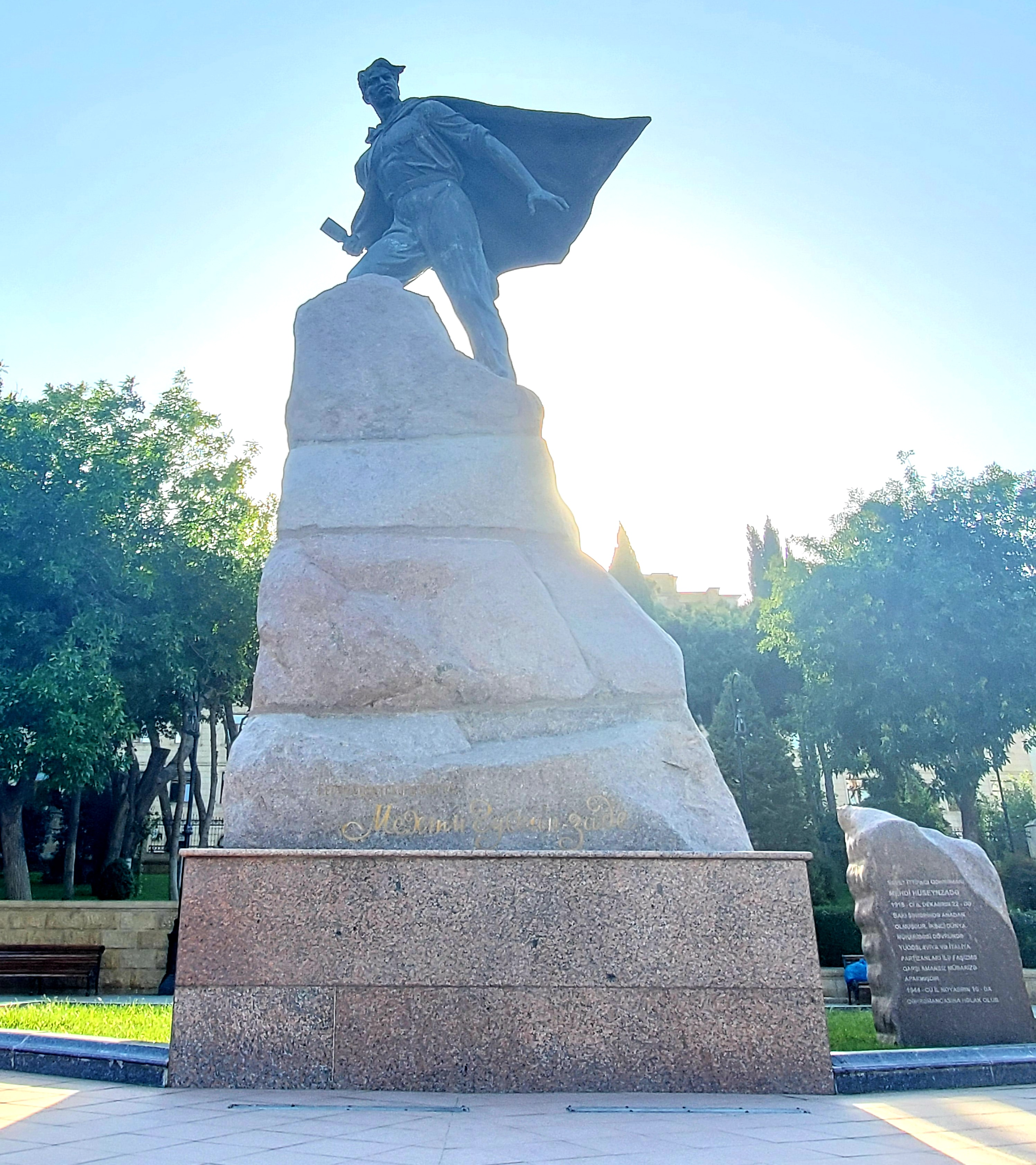
- Interactive map of Mehdi Huseynzade Monument
- Location: Baku, Azerbaijan
- Coordinates: 40°23′14″N 49°49′36″E
- Designer: Fuad Abdurahmanov
- Material: Bronze, granite
- Opening date: 1973
- Dedicated to: Mehdi Huseynzade

Mehdi Huseynzade Monument (Azerbaijani: Mehdi Hüseynzadənin heykəli) - is a monument to the Azerbaijani partisan of the Second World War, Hero of the Soviet Union, Mekhti Huseynzade, and was installed in 1973 in the capital of Azerbaijan, Baku, in the park along the Bakikhanov street near the northern entrance into the city. The sculptor is Fuad Abdurakhmanov, the Peoples Artist of the Azerbaijan SSR, the architect is Mikael Useinov, the Peoples Architect of the USSR.

The expressive figure of Mehdi Huseynzade in a fluttering cloak and with a grenade in his right hand stands on an unworked block of granite. As noted by the art critic Kamil Mammadzade, the attention is drawn to "the accuracy of the proportions ratio of the sculptural and architectural parts. The authors used the features of the relief of the mountainous part of the city, due to which the monument is clearly visible. According to the art critic Jamila Novruzova, the monument “combines as complex psychological tasks, also and monumental and decorative ones”.
