= Mehdi Huseynzade =

Soviet Azerbaijani partisan (1918–1944)

Mehdi Huseynzade Mehdi Hənifə oğlu Hüseynzadə
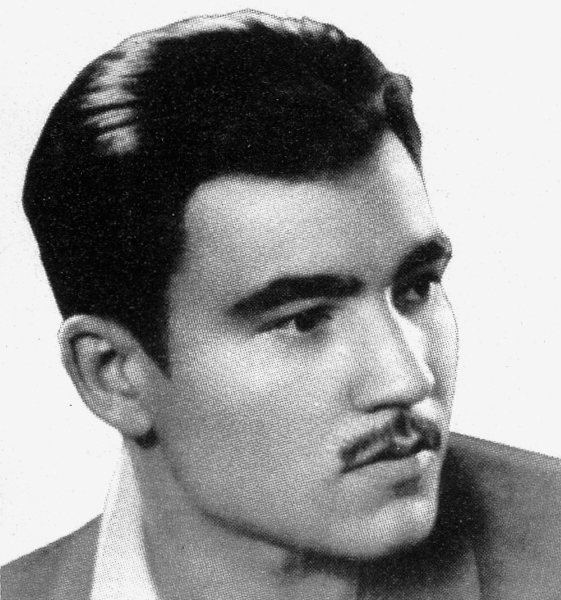
- Born: 22 December 1918; Novxanı, Baku Governorate, Azerbaijan Democratic Republic
- Died: 16 November 1944 (aged 25); Vitovlje, Kingdom of Italy (now Slovenia)
- Burial place: Čepovan, Nova Gorica, Slovenia
- Military career
- Allegiance: USSR; SFR Yugoslavia
- Branch: Yugoslav Partisans
- Service years: 1941–1944
- Rank: Lieutenant
- Nickname: Михайло (Mikhailo)
- Unit: 9th Corps of Yugoslav Partisans
- Commands: Reconnaissance and sabotage group
- Conflicts: Battle of Stalingrad; World War II in Yugoslavia
- Awards: Hero of the Soviet Union

Lieutenant Mehdi Huseynzade (Azerbaijani: Mehdi Hüseynzadə; Russian: Мехти Гусейнзаде; 22 December 1918, in Novxanı, Azerbaijan – 2 November 1944, in Vitovlje, Slovenia) was an Azerbaijani guerrilla and scout during World War II. He was posthumously awarded the title of Hero of the Soviet Union on 11 April 1957.

== Biography ==
=== Early years ===
Mehdi Huseynzade was born on 22 December 1918 in the village of Novxanı in the Baku province of Azerbaijan Democratic Republic. Huseynzade graduated from the Baku Art School, then studied at the Leningrad Institute of Foreign Languages. After returning to Baku in 1940, Huseynzade continued his education at the Azerbaijan State Pedagogical University

=== World War II ===
In August 1941, two months after Germany invaded the Soviet Union, Huseynzade was drafted into the Red Army. After graduating from the Tbilisi military infantry school in 1942, he was dispatched to the Soviet-German front line, where he commanded a mortar platoon during the Battle of Stalingrad.

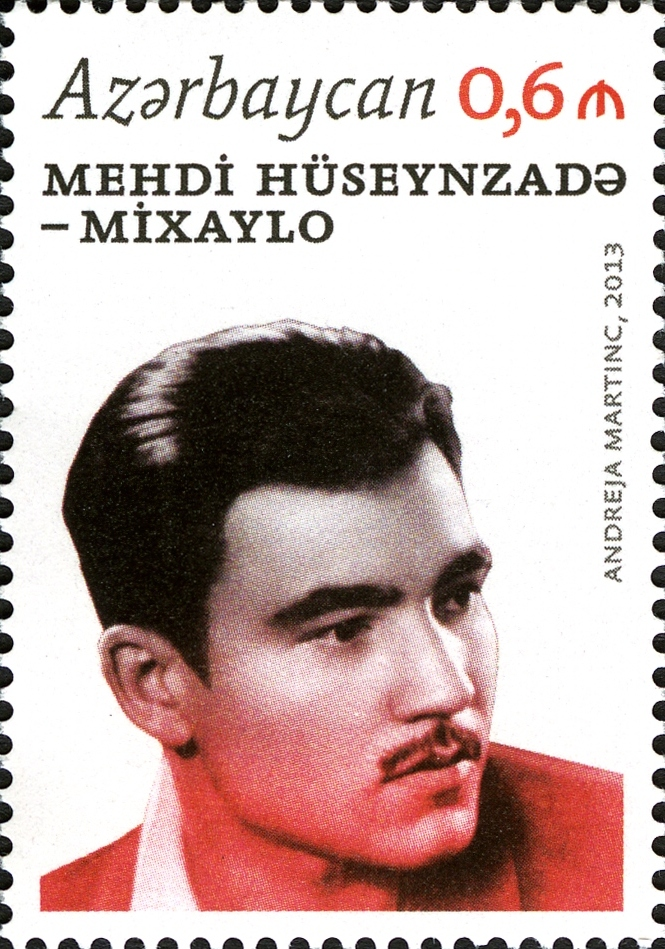
Stamp of Azerbaijan, 2013

In August 1942, near the town of Kalach-na-Donu, Huseynzade was seriously wounded and captured by the Germans. He spent 1.5 years in the German POW camps in Northern Italy and Yugoslavia. In early 1944, along with two other Azerbaijani POWs, Javad Hakimli and Asad Gurbanov, Huseynzade managed to escape and join the Yugoslav-Italian partisans guerrilla corps. During the same year, he became a commander of the special reconnaissance diversionary unit of the 9th Corps' Staff of the People's Liberation Army of Yugoslavia, where he got his battlename Mikhailo.

=== Guerrilla Mikhailo ===
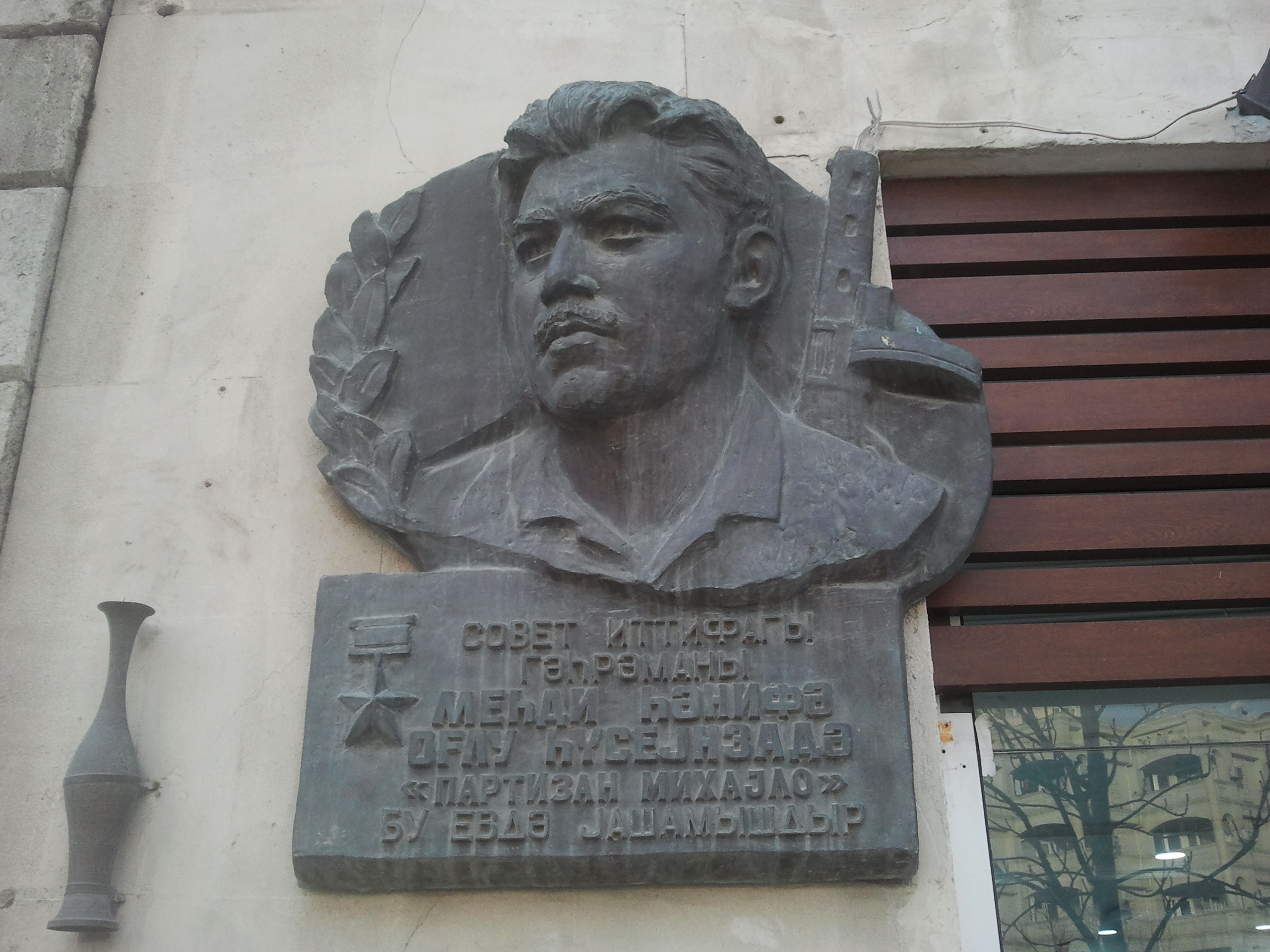
Plaque on building where Mehdi Huseynzade lived in Baku

In the middle of January 1944, Mikhailo with fellow partisans created a topographic map of enemy positions. Next month, Mehdi disguised as a German officer made way into a German barracks, where he concealed a bomb in a fire extinguisher, with the subsequent explosion resulting in heavy damage at the barracks.

On 2 April 1944, Huseynzade with another Azerbaijani guerrilla, Mirdamat Seidov, installed a delayed-action mine in the Villa Opicina cinema near Trieste. The explosion killed 80 and wounded 260 Germans, of which 40 died later in hospital. At the end of April 1944, Huseynzade, Hans Fritz and Ali Tagiyev blew up a bridge near the Postojna railway station, which led to a 24-car train crash. In May, Huseynzade and Seidov blew up a casino at Trieste, where 150 German officers died and 350 were wounded. Growing concerned about these attacks, Germans set a reward of 400,000 Italian liras for killing Huseynzade.

=== Death ===
On 2 November 1944,while returning from a successful mission to destroy a German ammunition depot, Mikhailo stumbled upon a German ambush near the town of Vitovlje, Slovenia. After an unequal scramble with German forces, killing 25 of them, Huseynzade ran out of bullets and used the last one to kill himself.

== Awards and honors ==
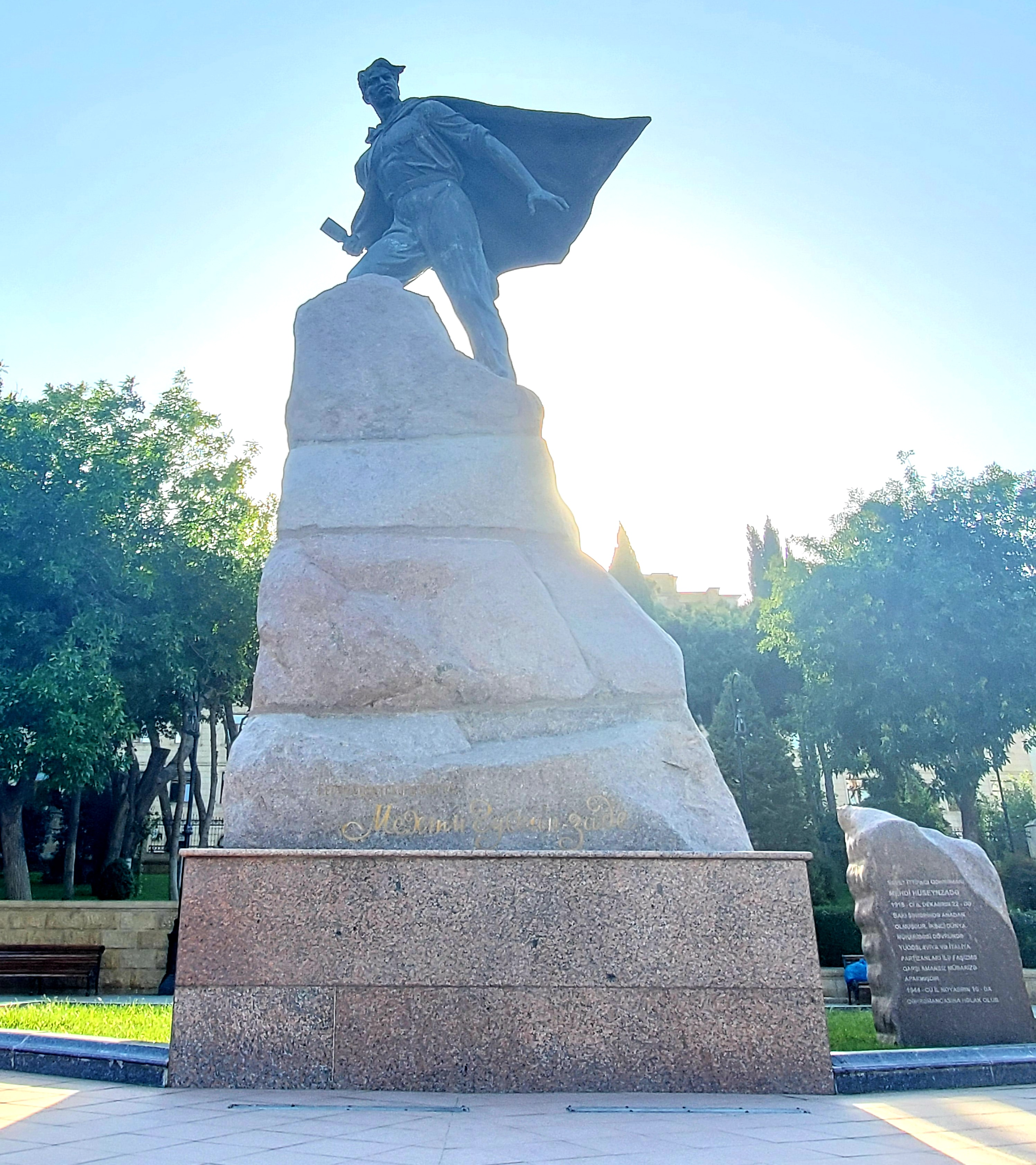
Mehdi Huseynzade Monument in Baku

His life and heroism during World War II was described in Imran Gasimov's book On Distant Shores ("Uzaq sahillərdə"), and the movie made in Soviet years by Azerbaijanfilm movie studio. A football stadium in Sumgayit was named after him. Monuments in his honour have been erected in Baku, as well as in his hometown of Novkhany, Azerbaijan, and near Nova Gorica, Slovenia.

In June 2026, a presentation ceremony for the documentary film Njihov Mehdi, naš Mihajlo ("Their Mehdi, Our Mihajlo") was held in Slovenia, telling the life story of Mehdi Huseynzade, who displayed great heroism fighting shoulder to shoulder with the Slovenian people during the years of World War II

== Private life ==
Mehdi Husein-Zade had two sisters — Bikya Khanum and Huriet. His nephew Agshin Alizadeh became a well-known Soviet and Azerbaijani composer, People's Artist of Azerbaijan.

He was a painter and he was able to play tar musical instrument. Mehdi was able to drive cars professionally.
