= Çaparlı, Shamkir =

Çaparlı
- Municipality
- Location within Azerbaijan
- Coordinates: 40°51′14″N 46°05′39″E
- Country: Azerbaijan
- Rayon: Shamkir

Population
  - Total: 1,587
- Time zone: UTC+4 (AZT)
  - Summer (DST): UTC+5 (AZT)

Çaparlı (also, Chaparly) is a village and municipality in the Shamkir Rayon of Azerbaijan. It has a population of 1,587.
