= Gorizia =

Gorizia Gorica (Slovene) Gurize (Friulian) Guriza (Eastern Friulian) Gorisia (Venetian) Görz (German)
- Comune
- Comune di Gorizia (Italian); Občina Gorica (Slovene); Comun di Gurize (Friulian); Gemeinde Görz (German)
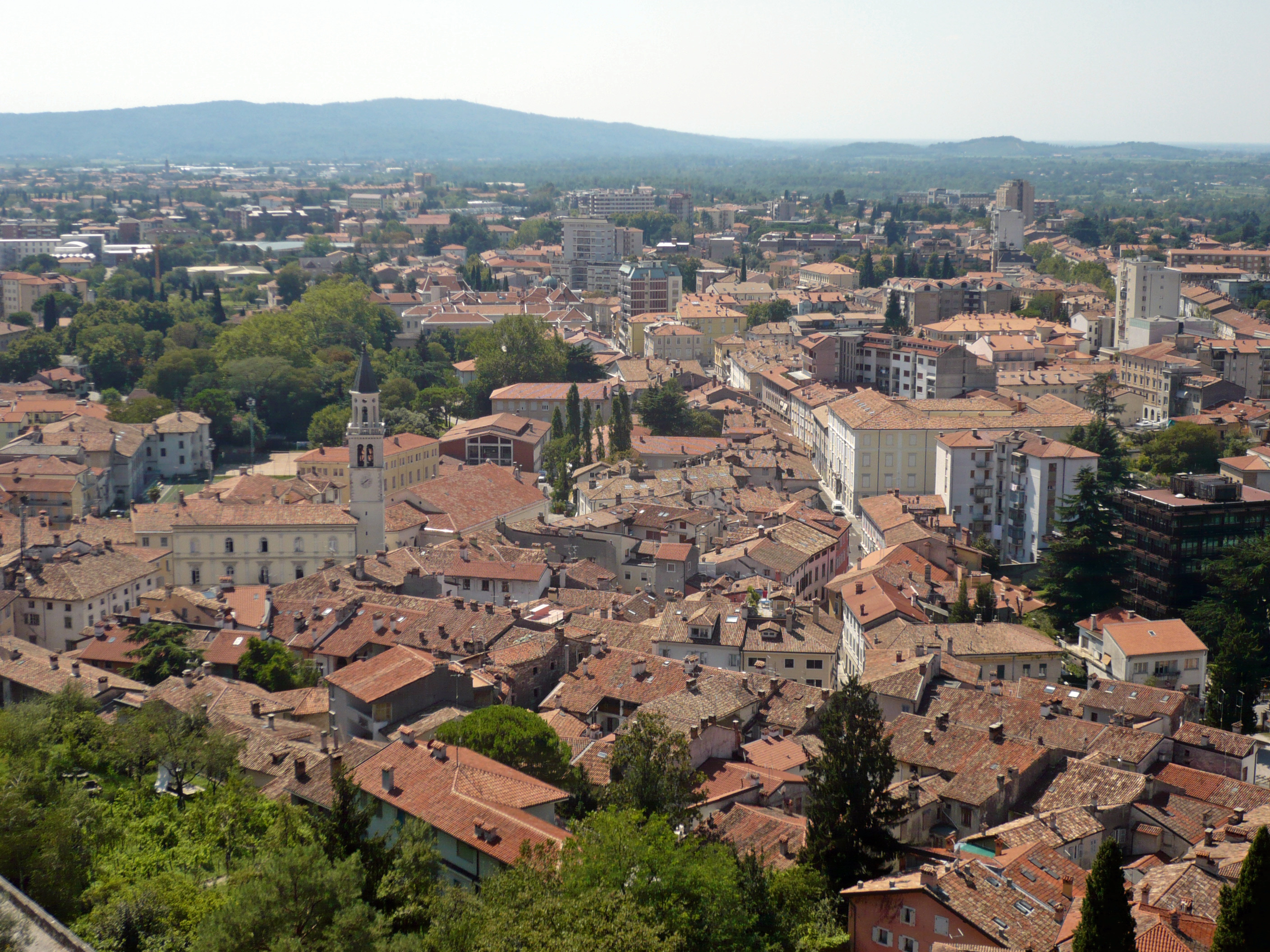
- The old part of Gorizia seen from the castle in August 2008

- Flag Coat of arms

- Location of Gorizia in Friuli-Venezia Giulia Gorizia (Italy)
- Coordinates: 45°56′N 13°37′E
- Country: Italy
- Region: Friuli-Venezia Giulia
- Province: Gorizia
- Frazioni: Castello, Lucinico (Ločnik), Oslavia (Oslavje), Piuma (Pevma), San Mauro (Šmaver), Sant'Andrea (Štandrež), Straccis (Stražišče), Vallone dell'Acqua, Gradiscutta, Piedimonte (Podgora)

Government
  - Mayor: Rodolfo Ziberna (Forza Italia)

Area
  - Total: 41.26 km^{2} (15.93 sq mi)
- Elevation: 86 m (282 ft)

Population (2025)
  - Total: 33,620
  - Density: 814.8/km^{2} (2,110/sq mi)
- Demonym(s): Goriziani (Italian); Goričani (Slovene)
- Time zone: UTC+1 (CET)
  - Summer (DST): UTC+2 (CEST)
- Postal code: 34170
- Dialing code: 0481
- ISTAT code: 031007
- Patron saint: Saints Hilary and Tatian
- Saint day: March 16
- Website: Official website

Gorizia (Italian: [ɡoˈrittsja]; Slovene: Gorica [ɡɔˈɾìːtsa]; (Note: Colloquially known in Slovenia as stara Gorica 'old Gorizia' to distinguish it from Nova Gorica.) Standard Friulian: Gurize, Southeastern Friulian: Guriza; Bisiacco: Gurissa; German: Görz [ɡœʁts]) is a town and municipality in the autonomous region of Friuli-Venezia Giulia of northeast Italy. It is located at the foot of the Julian Alps, bordering Slovenia. It is the capital of the Regional decentralization entity of Gorizia and is a local center of tourism, industry, and commerce. It has 33,620 inhabitants.

Since 1947, a twin town of Nova Gorica has developed on the other side of the modern-day Italy–Slovenia border. The region was subject to territorial dispute between Italy and Yugoslavia after World War II: after the new boundaries were established in 1947 and the old town was left to Italy, Nova Gorica was built on the Yugoslav side. The two towns constitute a conurbation, which also includes the Slovenian municipality of Šempeter-Vrtojba. Since May 2011, these three towns have been joined in a common trans-border metropolitan zone, administered by a joint administration board.

== Etymology ==
The name of the town comes from the Slovene word gorica 'little mountain', which is a common toponym in Slovene-inhabited areas.

== History ==
=== Middle Ages ===
Originating as a watchtower or a prehistoric castle controlling the fords of the Isonzo River, Gorizia first emerged as a small village not far from the former Via Gemina, the Roman road linking Aquileia and Emona (modern Ljubljana). The name Gorizia was recorded for the first time in a document dated April 28, 1001, in which Holy Roman Emperor Otto III donated the castle and the village of Goriza to the Patriarch of Aquileia John II and to Count Verihen Eppenstein of Friuli. The document referred to Gorizia as "the village known as Goriza in the language of the Slavs" ("Villa quae Sclavorum lingua vocatur Goriza").

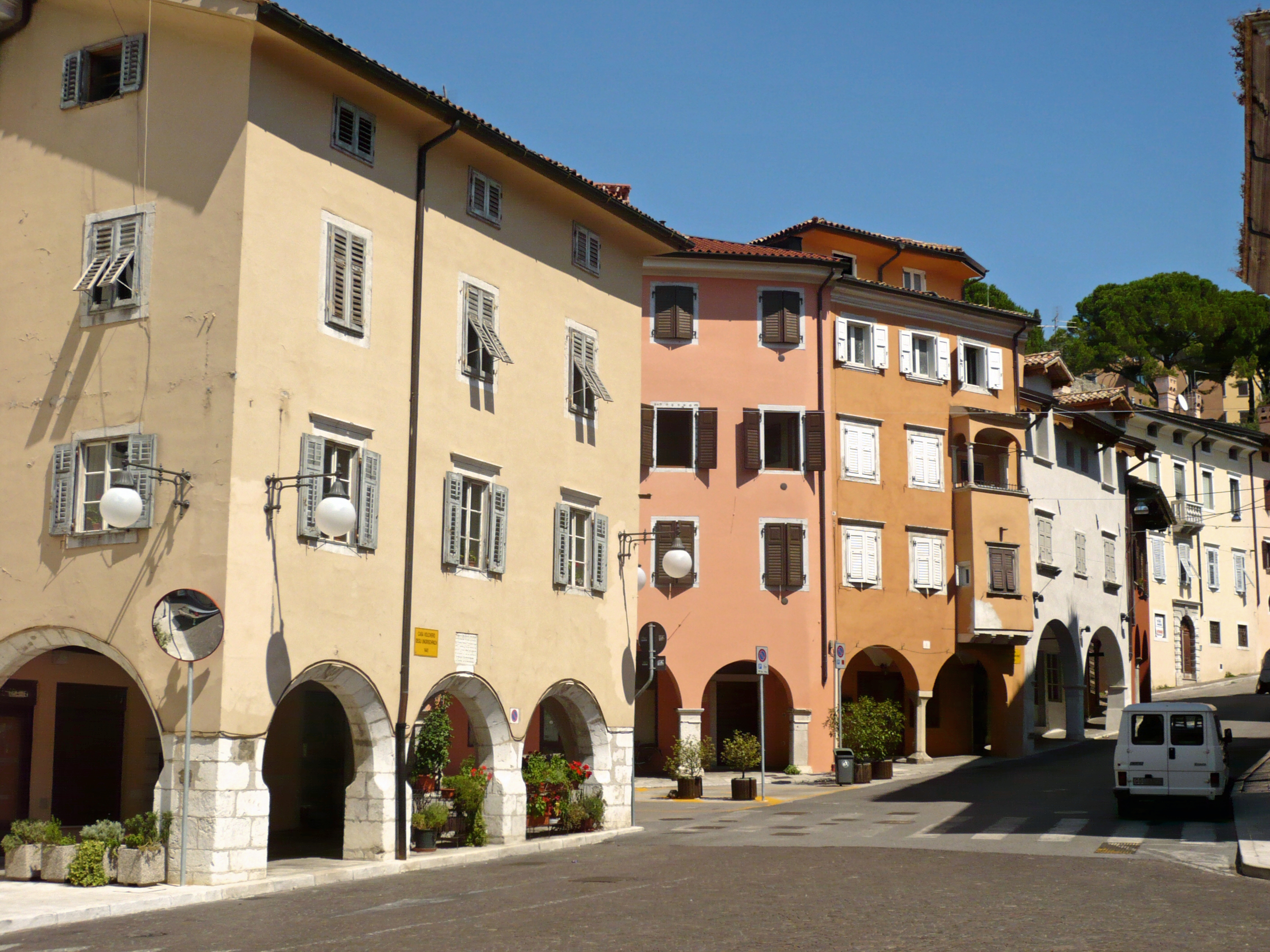
The medieval center of Gorizia

Count Meinhard of the Bavarian Meinhardiner noble lineage, with possessions around Lienz in Tyrol, is mentioned as early as 1107; as a vogt of the Patriarchate of Aquileia he was enfeoffed with large estates in the former March of Friuli, including the town of Gorizia, and as early as 1127 called himself Graf von Görz, Count of Gorizia. In the late 13th century, the House of Gorizia emerged as one of the most important noble houses in the Holy Roman Empire. The borders of the county changed frequently in the following three centuries due to frequent wars with Aquileia and other counties, and also to the subdivision of the territory in two main nuclei: one around the upper Drava river with the center in Lienz, the other around Gorizia itself. Between the 12th century and early 16th century, the town served as the political and administrative center of this essentially independent County of Gorizia, which at the height of its power comprised the territory of the present-day regions of Goriška, southeast Friuli, the Karst Plateau, central Istria, western Carinthia and East Tyrol, and the Windic March with Bela Krajina.

From the 11th century, the town had two different layers of development: the upper castle district and the village beneath it. The first played a political-administrative role and the second a rural-commercial role. The name of the central square, known to this day in both languages as Travnik or Traunig ("meadow", in Slovene), testifies to this period.

In the late 15th century, the city rights were expanded to the lower town.

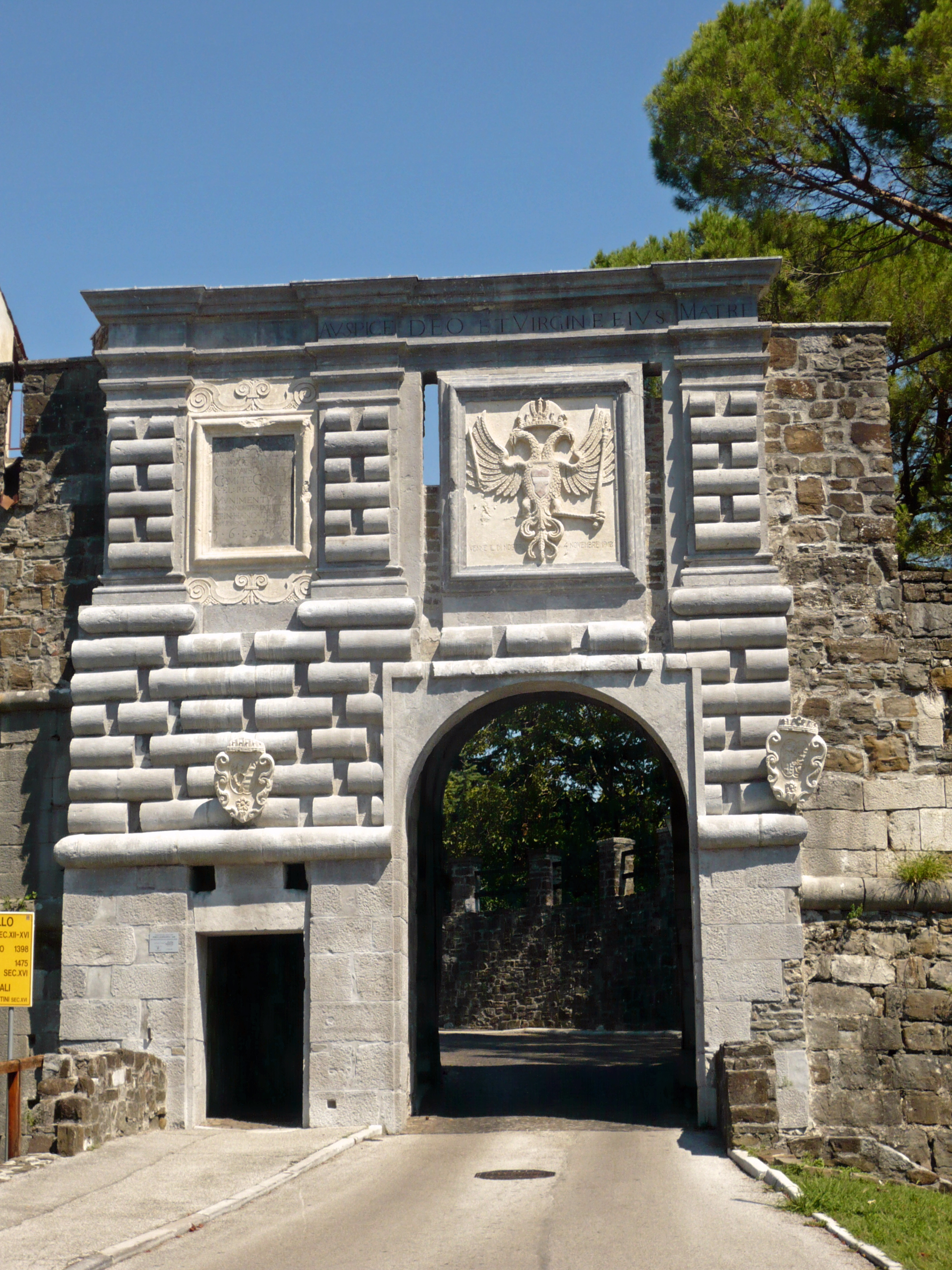
The Leopold Gate, built in the late 17th century in honor of Leopold I, Holy Roman Emperor

=== Habsburg rule ===
In 1500, the dynasty of the Counts of Gorizia died out and their County passed to Austrian Habsburg rule, after a short occupation by the Republic of Venice in the years 1508 and 1509. Under Habsburg dominion, the town spread out at the foot of the castle. Many settlers from northern Italy moved there and started their commerce. Gorizia developed into a multi-ethnic town, in which Friulian, German and Slovene were spoken.

In mid-16th century, Gorizia emerged as a center of Protestant Reformation, which was spreading from the neighboring northeastern regions of Carniola and Carinthia. The prominent Slovene Protestant preacher Primož Trubar also visited and preached in the town. By the end of the century, however, the Catholic Counter-Reformation had gained force in Gorizia, led by the local dean Johann Tautscher, who later became bishop of Ljubljana. Tautscher was also instrumental in bringing the Jesuit order to the town, which played a role in the education and cultural life in Gorizia thereafter.

Gorizia was at first part of the County of Gorizia and since 1754, the capital of the Princely County of Gorizia and Gradisca. In ecclesiastical matters, after the suppression of the Patriarchate of Aquileia in 1751, the Archdiocese of Gorizia was established as its legal successor on the territory of the Habsburg monarchy. Gorizia thus emerged as a Roman Catholic religious center. The archdiocese of Gorizia covers a large territory, extending to the Drava River to the north and the Kolpa to the east, with the dioceses of Trieste, Trento, Como and Pedena subject to the authority of the archbishops of Gorizia. A new town quarter developed around the Cathedral where many treasures from the Basilica of Aquileia were transferred. Many new villas were built conveying to the town the typical late Baroque appearance, which characterized it up to World War I. A synagogue was built within the town walls, too, which was another example of Gorizia's relatively tolerant multi-ethnic nature.

During the Napoleonic Wars, Gorizia was incorporated to the French Illyrian Provinces between 1809 and 1813. After the restoration of the Austrian rule, the Gorizia and its county were incorporated in the administrative unit known as the Kingdom of Illyria. During this period, Gorizia emerged as a popular summer residence of the Austrian nobility, and became known as the "Austrian Nice". Members of the former French ruling Bourbon family, deposed by the July Revolution of 1830, also settled in the town, including the last Bourbon monarch Charles X who spent his last years in Gorizia. Unlike in most neighboring areas, the revolutionary spring of nations of 1848 passed almost unnoticed in Gorizia, thus reaffirming its reputation of a calm and loyal provincial town.

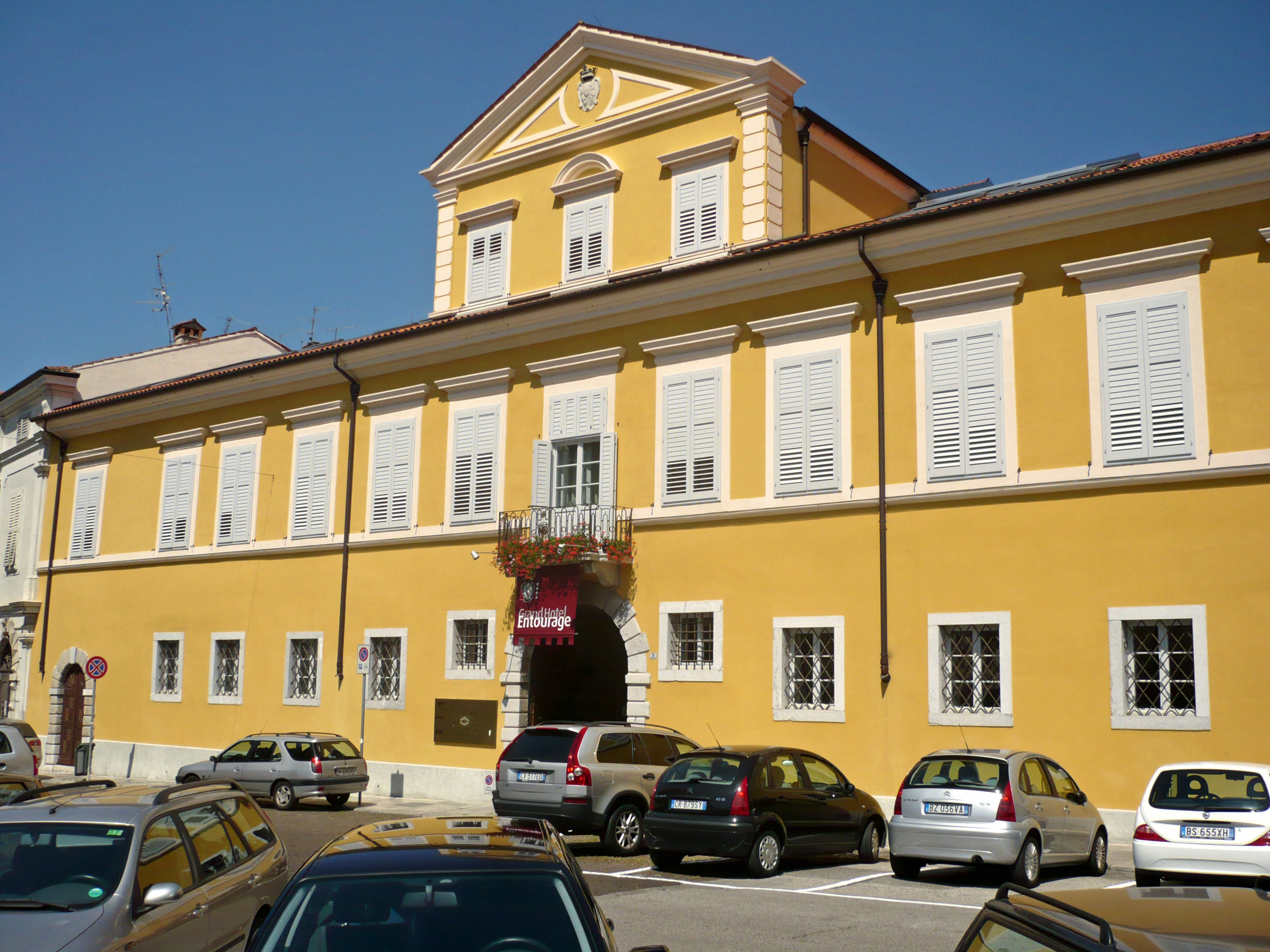
The Strassoldo Palace, residence of the Bourbon family in exile

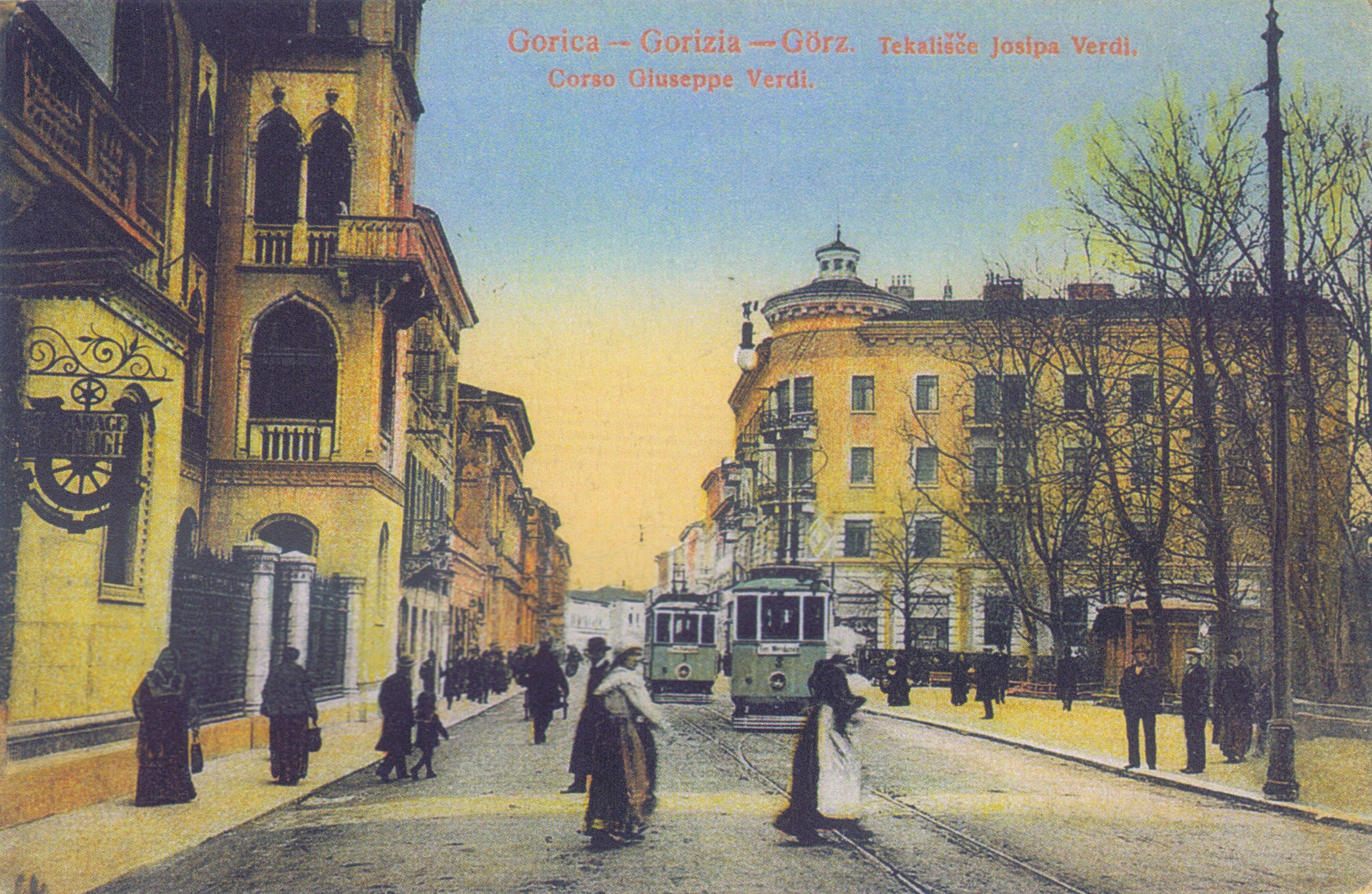
Gorizia at the beginning of the 20th century

In 1849, the County of Gorizia was included in the Austrian Littoral, along with Trieste and Istria. In 1861, the territory was reorganized as the Princely County of Gorizia and Gradisca and granted regional autonomy. At that time, Gorizia was a multi-ethnic town; Italian and Friulian, Slovene and German were all spoken in the town center, while in the suburbs Slovene and Friulian prevailed. Although some tensions between the Italian-Friulian and the Slovene population existed, the town continued to maintain a relatively tolerant climate in which both Slovene and Italian-Friulian cultures flourished.

On the eve of World War I, Gorizia had around 31,000 inhabitants and was the third-largest city in the Austrian Littoral, following Trieste and Pula (Pola). Another 14,000 people lived in the suburbs, making it one of the most populous urban agglomerations in the Alpe-Adria area, ahead of Klagenfurt, Maribor, Salzburg, Bozen or Trento. Within the city limits, about 48% of the population spoke Italian or Friulian as their first language, while 35% were Slovene speakers. In the suburbs, the Slovene speaking population prevailed, with 77% versus 21% Italian/Friulian speakers.

=== World War I ===
Gorizia was not on the frontline during the first 10 months of World War I, but the first Gorizian victim of the war occurred as early as August 10, 1914, when Countess Lucy Christalnigg was shot by Landsturmer guards while driving her car on a mission for the Austrian Red Cross.

Italy entered World War I on the Allied side and conflict with Austria-Hungary began on May 24, 1915. The hills west of Gorizia soon became the scene of fierce battles between the Italian and Austro-Hungarian armies. The town itself was seriously damaged and most of its inhabitants had been evacuated by early 1916. The Italian Army occupied Gorizia during the Sixth Battle of the Isonzo in August 1916, with the front line moving to the eastern outskirts of the town. With the Battle of Caporetto in October and November 1917, when the Central Powers pushed the Italians back to the Piave River, the town returned to Austro-Hungarian control.

After the Battle of Caporetto, Gorizia became the focus of three competing political camps: the unified Slovene nationalist parties that demanded a semi-independent Yugoslav state under the House of Habsburg, the Friulian conservatives and Christian Socialists who demanded a separate and autonomous Eastern Friuli within an Austrian confederation, and the underground Italian irredentist movement working for unification with Italy. At the end of World War I, in late October 1918, the Slovenes unilaterally declared an independent State of Slovenes, Croats and Serbs, while the Friulians continued to demand an autonomous region under Habsburg rule. Gorizia became a contested town. In early November 1918, it was occupied by Italian troops again, who immediately dissolved the two competing authorities and introduced their own civil administration.

=== Kingdom of Italy ===
In the first years of Italian administration, Gorizia was included in the Governorate of the Julian March (1918–1919). In 1920, the town and the whole region became officially part of Italy. The autonomous County of Gorizia and Gradisca was dissolved in 1922, and in 1924 it was annexed to the Province of Udine (then called the Province of Friuli). In 1927 Gorizia became a provincial capital within the Julian March administrative region. During the fascist regime, all Slovene organizations were dissolved, and the public use of Slovene was prohibited. Underground Slovene organizations, with an anti-Fascist and often irredentist agenda, such as the militant insurrectionist organization TIGR, were established as a result. Many Slovenes fled to the Kingdom of Yugoslavia and to South America, especially to Argentina. Many of these emigrants became prominent in their new environments. Very few Slovene-speaking intellectuals and public figures decided to stay in the town, and those few who did, like the writer France Bevk, were subject to persecution.

The town, heavily damaged during World War I, was rebuilt in the 1920s according to the plans laid out by the local architect Max Fabiani. Several rationalist buildings were built during this period, including some fine examples of Fascist architecture. The borders of the town were expanded, absorbing the suburbs of Salcano (Solkan), Podgora, Lucinico, and San Pietro di Gorizia (Šempeter pri Gorici), as well as the predominantly rural settlements of Vertoiba (Vrtojba), Boccavizza (Bukovica) and Sant'Andrea (Štandrež). According to the Italian census of 1921, the expanded town had around 47,000 inhabitants, among whom 45.5% were native Slovene, 33% Italian (mostly Venetian), and 20.5% Friulian speakers.

Benito Mussolini visited the town twice: in 1938 and in 1942.

After the Italian armistice in September 1943, the town was shortly occupied by the Slovene partisan resistance, but soon fell under Nazi German administration. Between 1943 and 1945 it was incorporated into the Operational Zone Adriatic Littoral. The Germans operated a subcamp of the Stalag 337 prisoner-of-war camp in the town. The town was briefly occupied by the Yugoslav Army in May and June 1945. With the arrival of the Yugoslav partisans in Gorizia in May 1945, a fierce repression began against the opponents, or potential opponents of the regime. At least 1,048 Italian civilians and military disappeared. According to some historians, many of the killings and violence suffered by the Italian ethnic group in Gorizia (and the rest of Friuli and Venezia Giulia) by the Yugoslav army were perpetrated as part of an ethnic cleansing practiced by Tito. Soon the administration was transferred to the Allies, who ruled the town for more than two years, amidst fierce ethnic and political turmoil.

=== Postwar partition and return to Italy ===
On September 15, 1947, the town was assigned to Italy. Several peripheral districts of the municipality of Gorizia (Solkan, Pristava, Rožna Dolina, Kromberk, Šempeter pri Gorici, Vrtojba, Stara Gora, Ajševica, Volčja Draga, Bukovica, and Vogrsko) were handed over to the Federal People's Republic of Yugoslavia, together with the vast majority of the former Province of Gorizia. Around a half of the prewar area of the municipality of Gorizia, with an approximate 20% of the population, was annexed to Yugoslavia. The national border was drawn just off the town center, essentially just to the west of the Bohinj Railway line, putting Gorizia into a peripheral zone. Several landmarks of the town, such as the Kostanjevica Monastery (Convento di Castagnevizza), Kromberk Castle (Castello Coronini, the Sveta Gora (Monte Santo) pilgrimage site, the old Jewish cemetery, and the northern railway station, were on the Yugoslav side of the border. In 1948, the authorities of the Socialist Republic of Slovenia (with president Josip Broz Tito's special support) started building a new town called Nova Gorica (lit. 'New Gorizia') on their side of the border.

From the late 1940s onward, Gorizia gave refuge to thousands of Istrian Italians that had fled the regions annexed to Yugoslavia. Many of those settled in the town and had a role in shaping its postwar national and political identity.

Though a border city, Gorizia was only in part crossed by the border with Yugoslavia. Some important old buildings once belonging to Gorizia were included in the Yugoslav territory: these include the old railway station of the Transalpina line that connected Trieste to Villach, as well as to the town landmarks. Although the situation in Gorizia was often compared with that of Berlin during the Cold War, Italy and Yugoslavia had good relations regarding Gorizia. These included cultural and sporting events that favoured the spirit of harmonious coexistence that remained in place after Yugoslavia broke up in 1991.

With the breakup of Yugoslavia, the frontier remained as the division between Italy and Slovenia until the implementation of the Schengen Agreement by Slovenia on December 21, 2007.

== Geography ==
=== Climate ===
Gorizia has a humid subtropical climate (Köppen climate classification Cfa). The town is located at the confluence of the Isonzo and Vipava Valleys. It lies on a plain overlooked by the Gorizia Hills. Sheltered from the north and from the east by a mountain ridge, Gorizia is completely protected from the cold bora wind, which affects the rest of the neighboring areas. The town thus enjoys an exceptionally mild climate throughout the year, making it a popular resort town.

Climate data for Gorizia (1971–2000)
Month	Jan	Feb	Mar	Apr	May	Jun	Jul	Aug	Sep	Oct	Nov	Dec	Year
Record high °C (°F)	18.4 (65.1)	23.1 (73.6)	26.0 (78.8)	28.9 (84.0)	33.7 (92.7)	37.4 (99.3)	38.5 (101.3)	38.7 (101.7)	36.8 (98.2)	30.1 (86.2)	25.5 (77.9)	19.6 (67.3)	38.7 (101.7)
Mean daily maximum °C (°F)	7.2 (45.0)	8.6 (47.5)	12.8 (55.0)	16.7 (62.1)	21.8 (71.2)	25.4 (77.7)	28.0 (82.4)	27.9 (82.2)	23.7 (74.7)	18.2 (64.8)	12.5 (54.5)	8.9 (48.0)	17.6 (63.8)
Daily mean °C (°F)	3.3 (37.9)	4.7 (40.5)	8.3 (46.9)	12.0 (53.6)	17.1 (62.8)	20.5 (68.9)	23.0 (73.4)	22.6 (72.7)	18.9 (66.0)	13.8 (56.8)	7.8 (46.0)	4.0 (39.2)	13.0 (55.4)
Mean daily minimum °C (°F)	−0.1 (31.8)	0.8 (33.4)	4.1 (39.4)	7.8 (46.0)	12.7 (54.9)	16.1 (61.0)	18.3 (64.9)	17.7 (63.9)	14.3 (57.7)	9.6 (49.3)	4.0 (39.2)	0.6 (33.1)	8.8 (47.8)
Record low °C (°F)	−14.2 (6.4)	−12.9 (8.8)	−8.1 (17.4)	−4 (25)	0.9 (33.6)	5.7 (42.3)	8.9 (48.0)	9.2 (48.6)	5.2 (41.4)	−2.9 (26.8)	−7.8 (18.0)	−15.5 (4.1)	−15.5 (4.1)
Average precipitation mm (inches)	49.6 (1.95)	46.8 (1.84)	60.1 (2.37)	76.3 (3.00)	77.6 (3.06)	70.5 (2.78)	69.6 (2.74)	68.5 (2.70)	89.2 (3.51)	101.2 (3.98)	83.4 (3.28)	60.2 (2.37)	853 (33.58)
Average precipitation days (≥ 1.0 mm)	6.0	5.2	5.7	8.3	8.2	8.6	5.9	6.1	5.9	6.7	5.8	5.9	78.3
Average relative humidity (%)	82	78	75	74	71	72	70	69	74	77	80	81	75.8
Mean monthly sunshine hours	77.8	100.4	144.5	179.7	228.1	249.9	285.7	261.3	210.4	144.0	99.8	62.4	2,044
Source: MeteoAM (sun and humidity 1961–1990)

== Border crossings ==
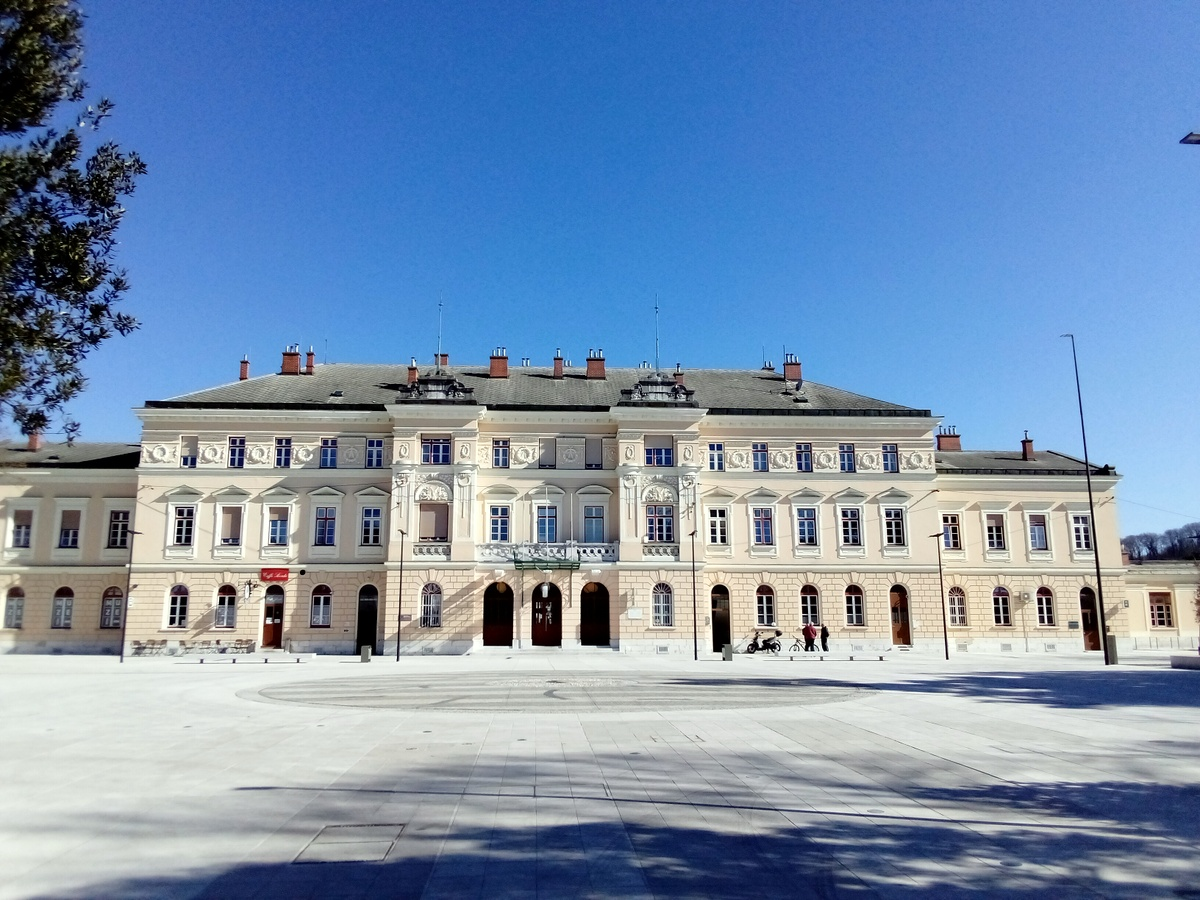
New informal border crossing on Transalpina Square for GO! 2025

The Italy–Slovenia border runs by the edge of Gorizia and Nova Gorica, and there are several border crossings between the cities. The ease of movement between the two parts of town has depended very much on the politics of both countries, ranging from strict controls to total free movement since December 21, 2007, when Slovenia joined the Schengen area.

Designated border crossings are (Gorizia-Nova Gorica):

- Casa Rossa–Rožna Dolina: main international crossing checkpoint
- Via San Gabriele–Erjavčeva ulica: previously only for local traffic with passes, nearest crossing to Nova Gorica center
- Via del Rafut-Pristava: previously only for local traffic with passes
- San Pietro (Via Vittorio Veneto)/Šempeter pri Gorici (Goriška ulica)
- Transalpina Square: open pedestrian square dissected by the border that was once fenced. The square was never an official crossing and signboards were erected to prohibit people from crossing the square from one side to the other
- The major highway crossing at Sant'Andrea–Vrtojba is located nearby to the south of the city.

== Demographics ==
Historical population (Current boundaries)
Year	Pop.	±%
1921	35,268	—
1931	38,116	+8.1%
1936	37,616	−1.3%
1951	40,627	+8.0%
1961	42,187	+3.8%
1971	42,778	+1.4%
1981	41,557	−2.9%
1991	38,505	−7.3%
2001	35,667	−7.4%
2011	35,212	−1.3%
2021	33,615	−4.5%
Source: ISTAT

As of 2025, there are 33,666 people residing in Gorizia, of whom 49.3% are male and 50.7% are female. Minors make up 12.9% of the population, and pensioners make up 28.5%. This compares with the Italian average of 14.9% minors and 24.7% pensioners.

The chart below shows the historical development of the population of Gorizia from the late 18th century to the eve of World War I, according to official Austrian censuses. The figures show the population of the municipality of Gorizia in the boundaries of the time. The criteria for the definition of the ethnical structure were changing over the years: in 1789, only the religious affiliation of the population was taken into account; in 1869 the ethnic affiliation was also recorded, with Jews counted as a separate category; in 1880 the category of ethnicity was replaced by the mother tongue, and from 1890 to 1910 only the "language of everyday communication" (German: Umgangsprache) was recorded. After 1869, the Jews were only recorded as a religious community, under the official category of "Israelites". The data below refer to the population within the current borders of the city:

Census		Ethnic structure
Year	Population	Italians	Slovenes	Germans	Jews
1789	7,639	n.a.	n.a.	n.a.	3.9%
1850	10,581	n.a.	n.a.	n.a.	n.a.
1857	13,297	n.a.	n.a.	n.a.	n.a.
1869	16,659	66.6%	21.0%	10.8%	1.8%
1880	26,080	59.4%	25.7%	8.4%	(1.4%)
1890	27,521	60.8%	26.5%	4.8%	n.a.
1910	38,279	45.3%	39.6%	8.9%	(0.9%)
1921	39,829	60.8%	37.1%	n.a.	n.a.
1924	45,540	70.6%	28.5%	n.a.	n.a.
1936	52,065	68.1%	30.0%	n.a.	n.a.

=== Foreign population ===
As of January 1st, 2025 there were 4,060 residents from outside Italy in Gorizia. This was 12.2% of the population. The largest groups are:

1. Slovenia 776
2. Kosovo 368
3. Bosnia and Herzegovina 298
4. Romania 273
5. Pakistan 223
6. Ukraine 203
7. China 200
8. Morocco 190
9. North Macedonia 183
10. Bangladesh 134

=== Religion ===
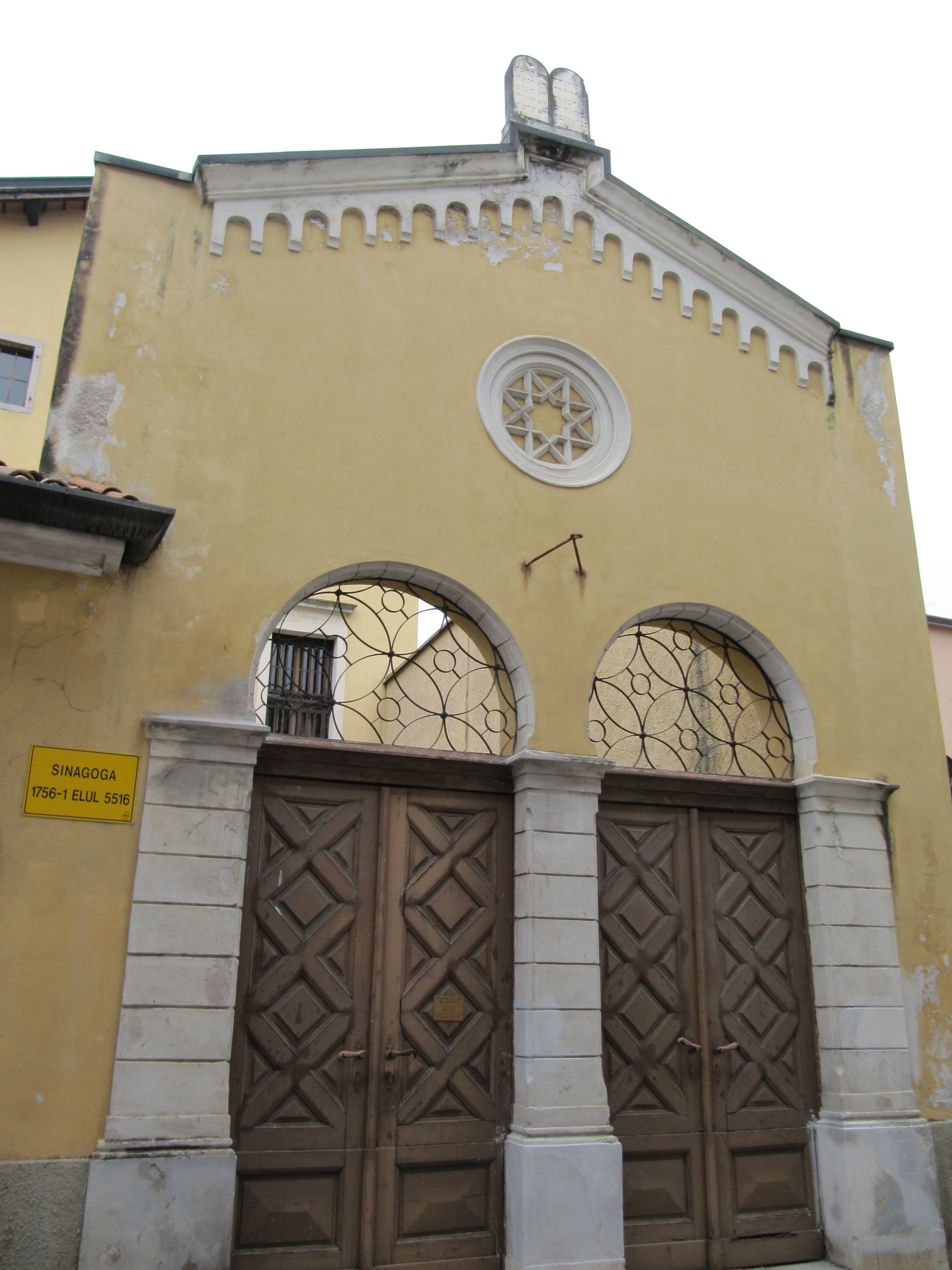
Gorizia's synagogue

The majority of the population of Gorizia is of Roman Catholic denomination. The town is the seat of the Archbishop of Gorizia, who was one of the three legal descendants of the Patriarchate of Aquileia (along with the Patriarchate of Venice and the Archdiocese of Udine). Between mid-18th century and 1920, Gorizia was thus the center of a Metropolitan bishopric that comprised the Dioceses of Ljubljana, Trieste, Poreč-Pula and Krk. Religious figures who lived and worked in Gorizia during this period include Cardinal Jakob Missia, Bishop Frančišek Borgia Sedej, theologians Anton Mahnič and Josip Srebrnič, and the Franciscan friar and philologian Stanislav Škrabec.

There are many important Roman Catholic sacral buildings in the area, among them the sanctuaries of Sveta Gora ("Holy Mountain") and the Kostanjevica Monastery, both of which are now located in Slovenia.

Until 1943, Gorizia had a Jewish community; most of its members were murdered in the Holocaust. A Lutheran community exists in Gorizia.

== Monuments and places of interest ==
- The castle, built within the medieval walls, was once the seat of the administrative and judiciary power of the county. It is divided into the Corte dei Lanzi (with foundings of a high tower demolished in the 16th century), the Palazzetto dei Conti (13th century) and the Palazzetto Veneto. The Lanzi were the armed guards, the term being an Italian form of Landsknecht. The palatine chapel, entitled to Saint Bartholomew houses canvases of the Venetian school of painting and traces of Renaissance frescoes. There is also a Museum of the Goritian Middle Ages.
- The cathedral (originally erected in the 14th century), like many of the city's buildings, was almost entirely destroyed during World War I. It has been rebuilt following the forms of the 1682 edifice, a Baroque church with splendid stucco decoration. A Gothic chapel of San Acatius is annexed to the nave.
- The church of Gorizia of St. Ignatius of Loyola, built by the Jesuits in 1680–1725. It has a single nave with precious sculptures at the altars of the side chapels. In the chancel Christoph Tausch painted the Glory of St. Ignatius in 1721.
- The Palazzo Attems Petzenstein (19th century), designed by Nicolò Pacassi.
- Saint Roch's Church.
- Palazzo Cobenzl, today seat of the archbishops.
- The Counts of Lantieri's house, which housed emperors and popes in its history.
- The Palazzo Coronini Cronberg, including an art gallery.
- Victory Square (Piazza della Vittoria), the largest square in the city and opposite the Fountain of Neptune, there is Via Giorgio Bombi leading to the tunnel under the castle, inaugurated in the 1950s and used for decades as a pedestrian and cycle path. After a period of closure, works for an urban regeneration and renewal intervention, it gave life to the DAG – Digital Art Gallery at the end of 2025.
- Transalpina railway square, divided by an international border.
- The Department of International and Diplomatic Sciences of the University of Trieste, hosted in the Seminario Minore, is an academic course in foreign affairs.
- Gorizia Courthouse
- Oslavia War Memorial

=== Gallery ===
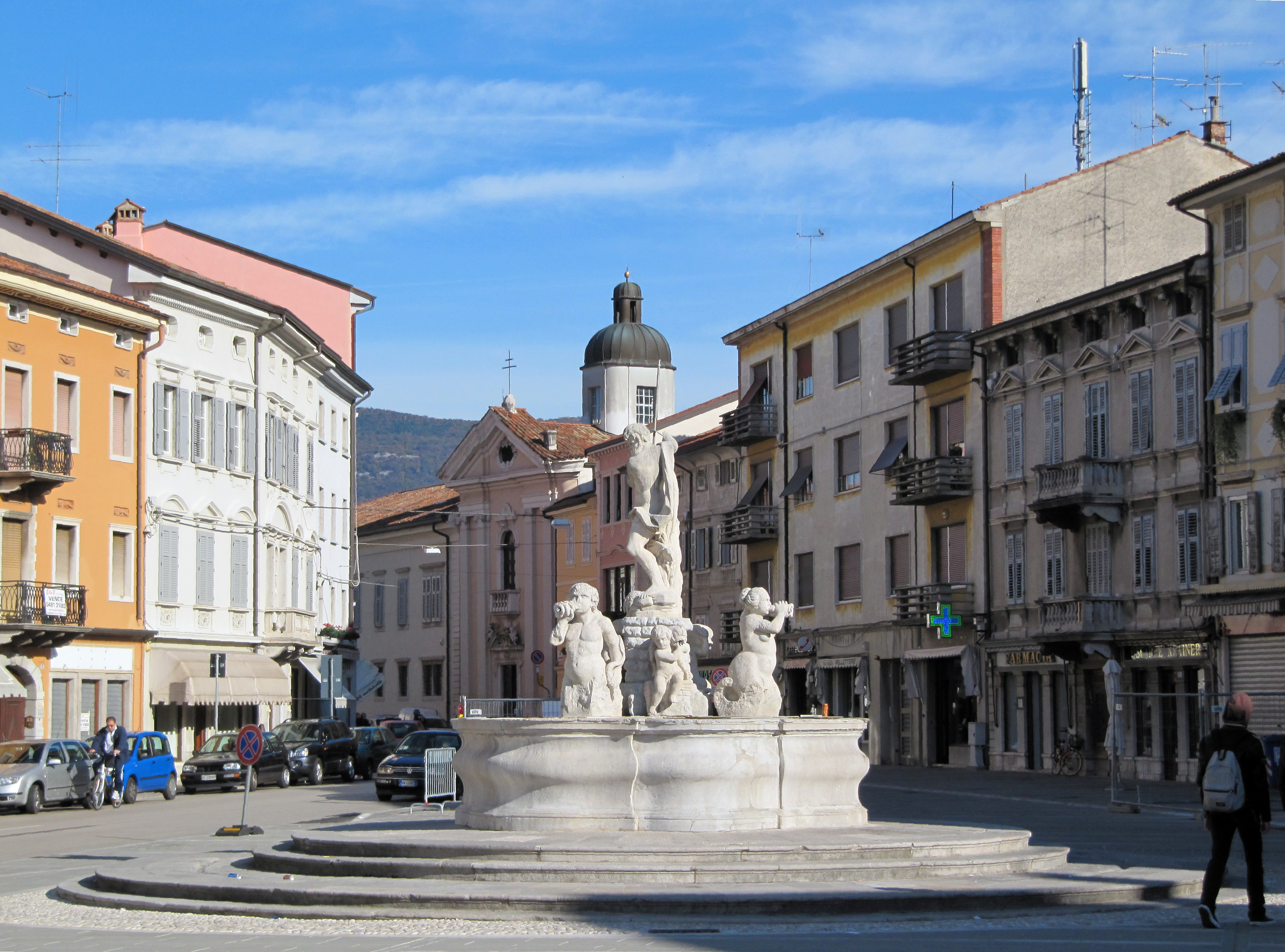
Victory Square (Piazza della Vittoria) is the traditional center of the town.

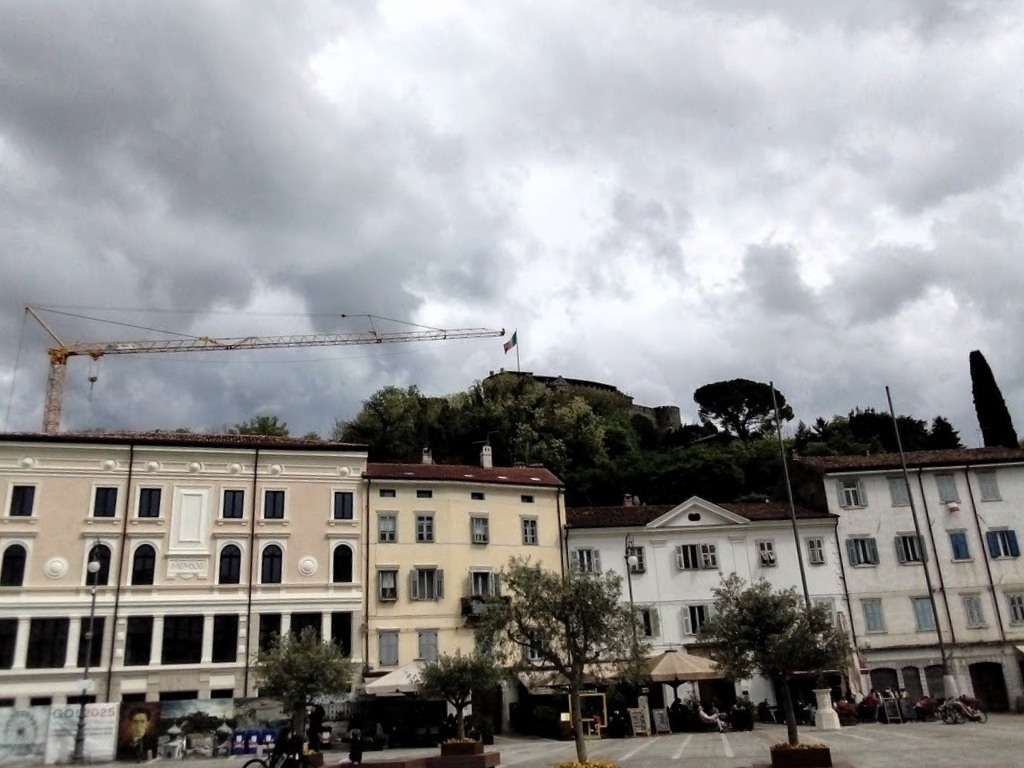
Renovation of the tunnel under the Castle

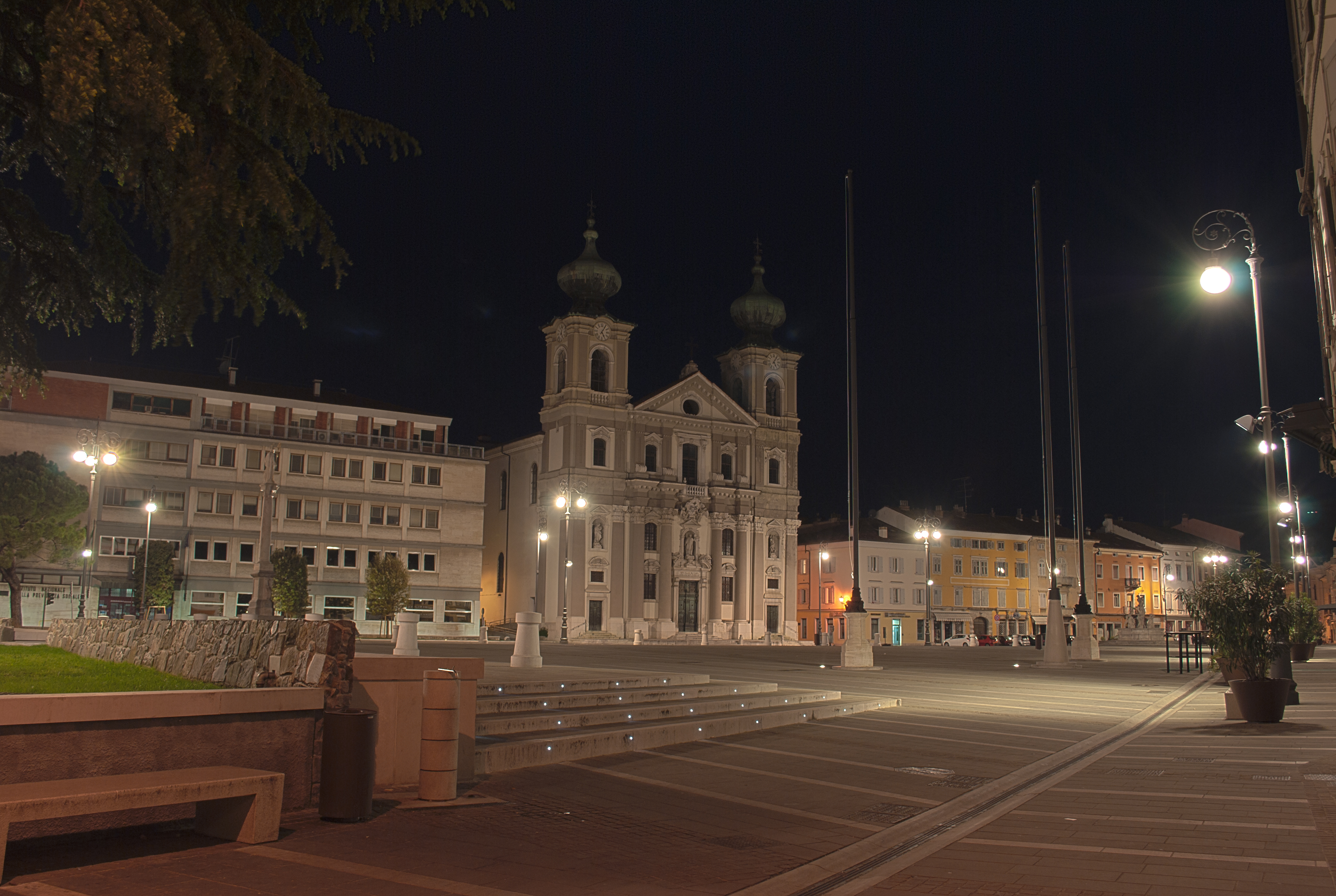
Night view of Piazza della Vittoria from Via Rastello

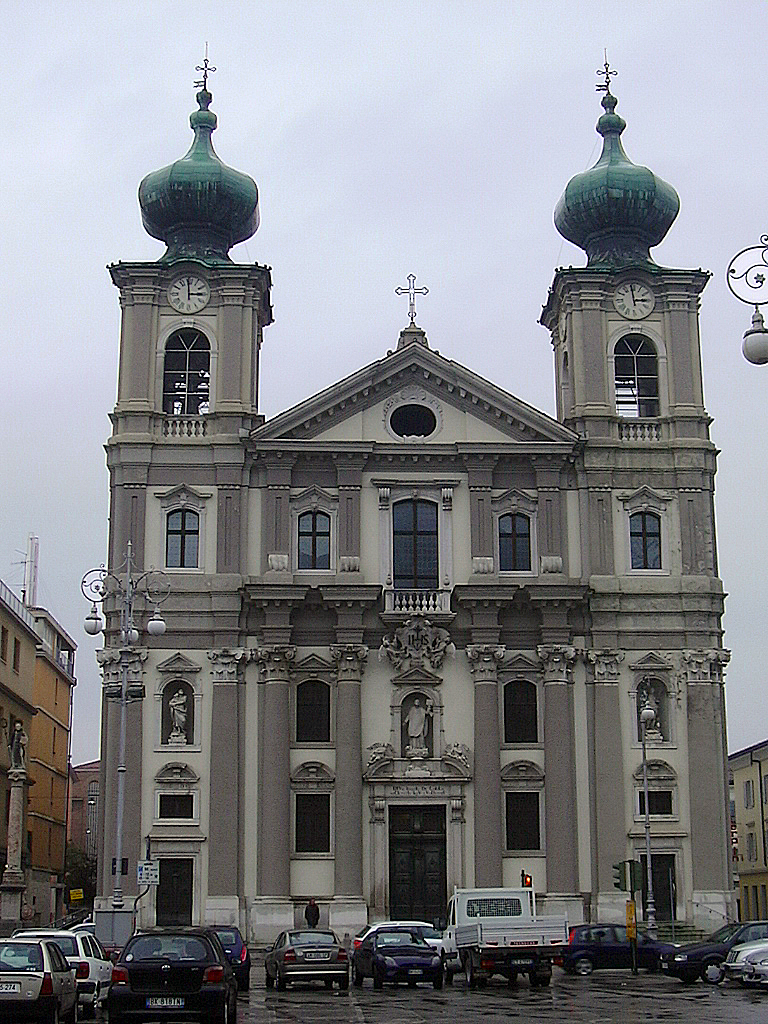
Saint Ignatius's Church

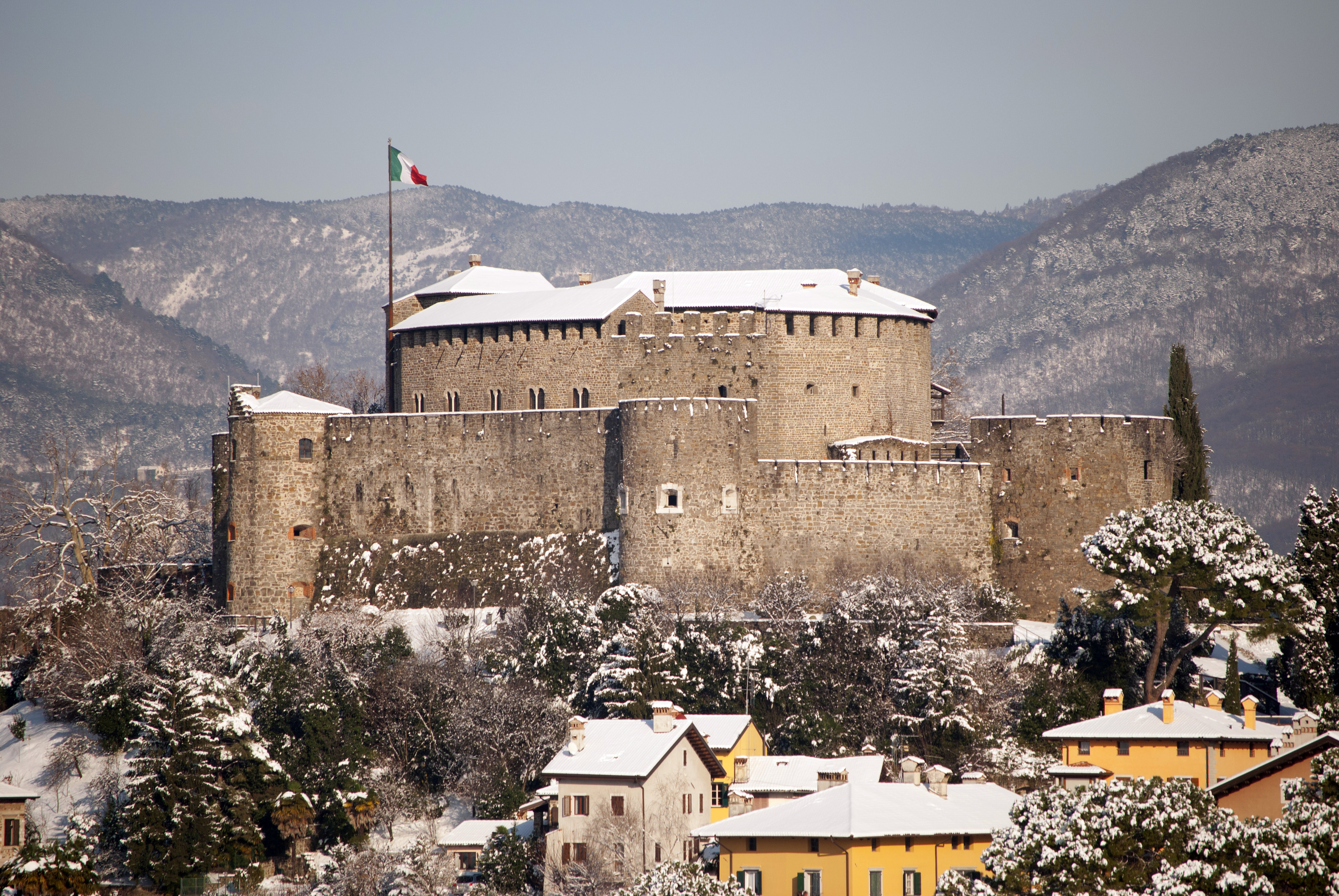
Gorizia Castle

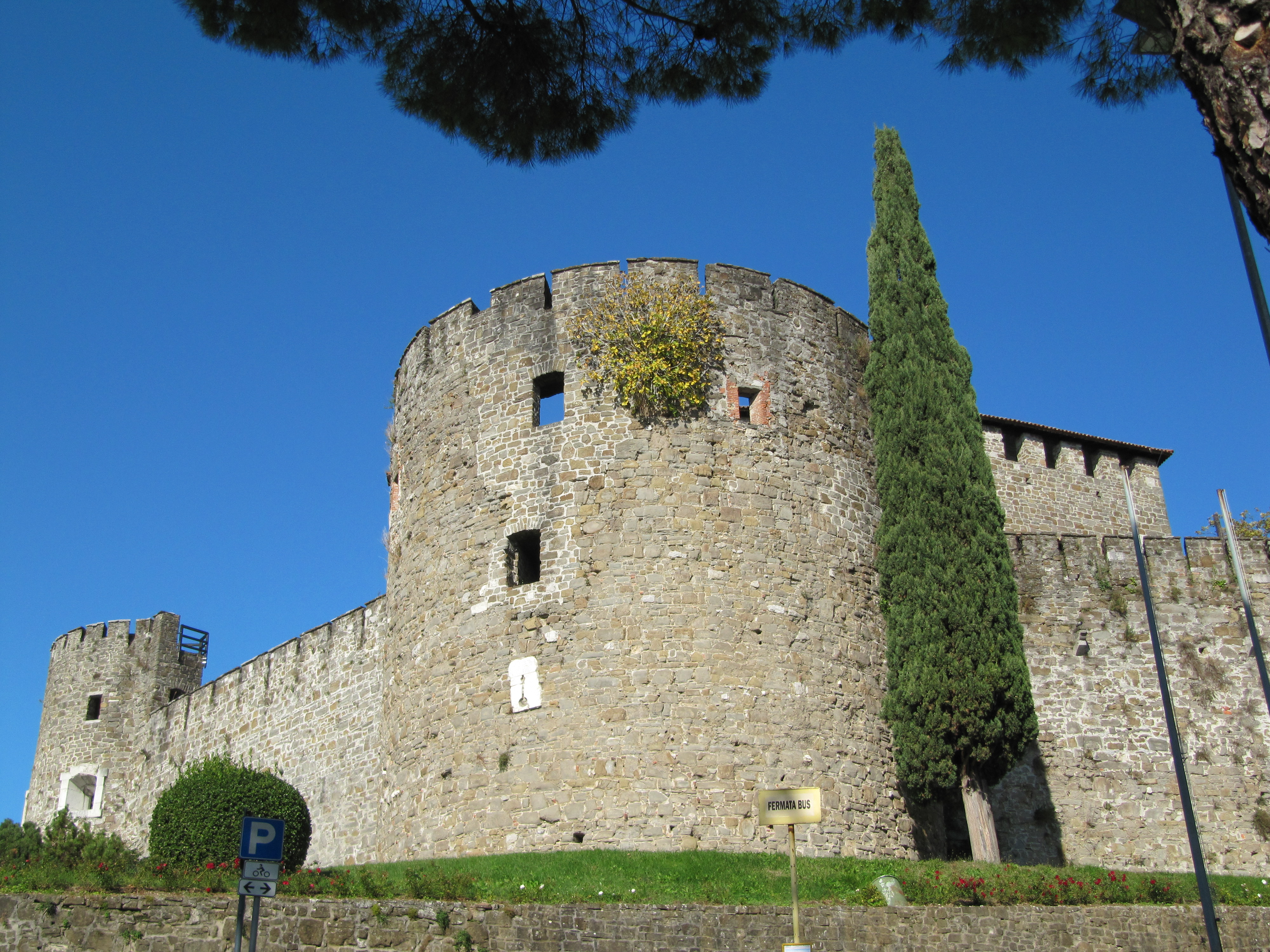
Gorizia Castle

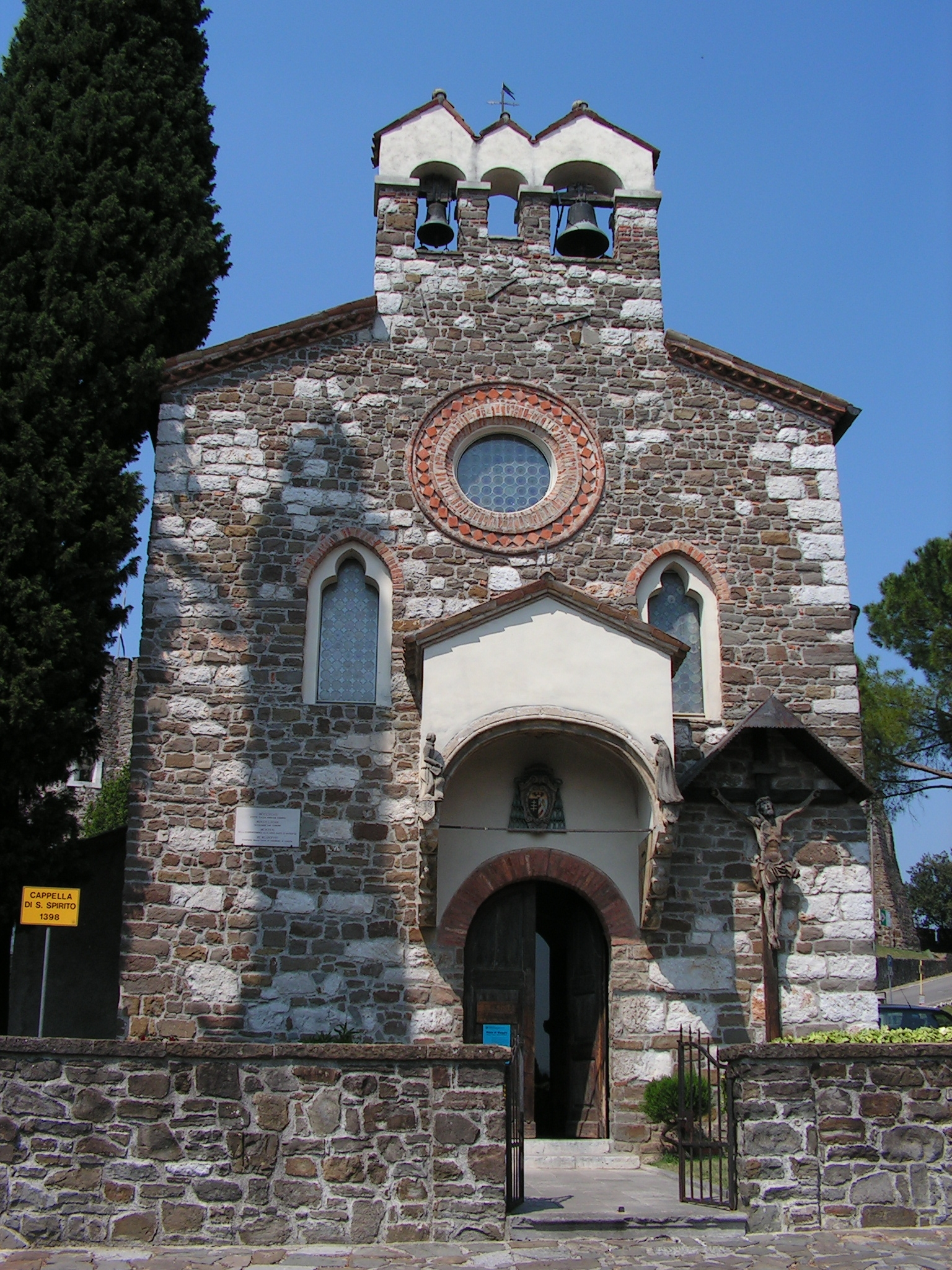
Holy Spirit Chapel

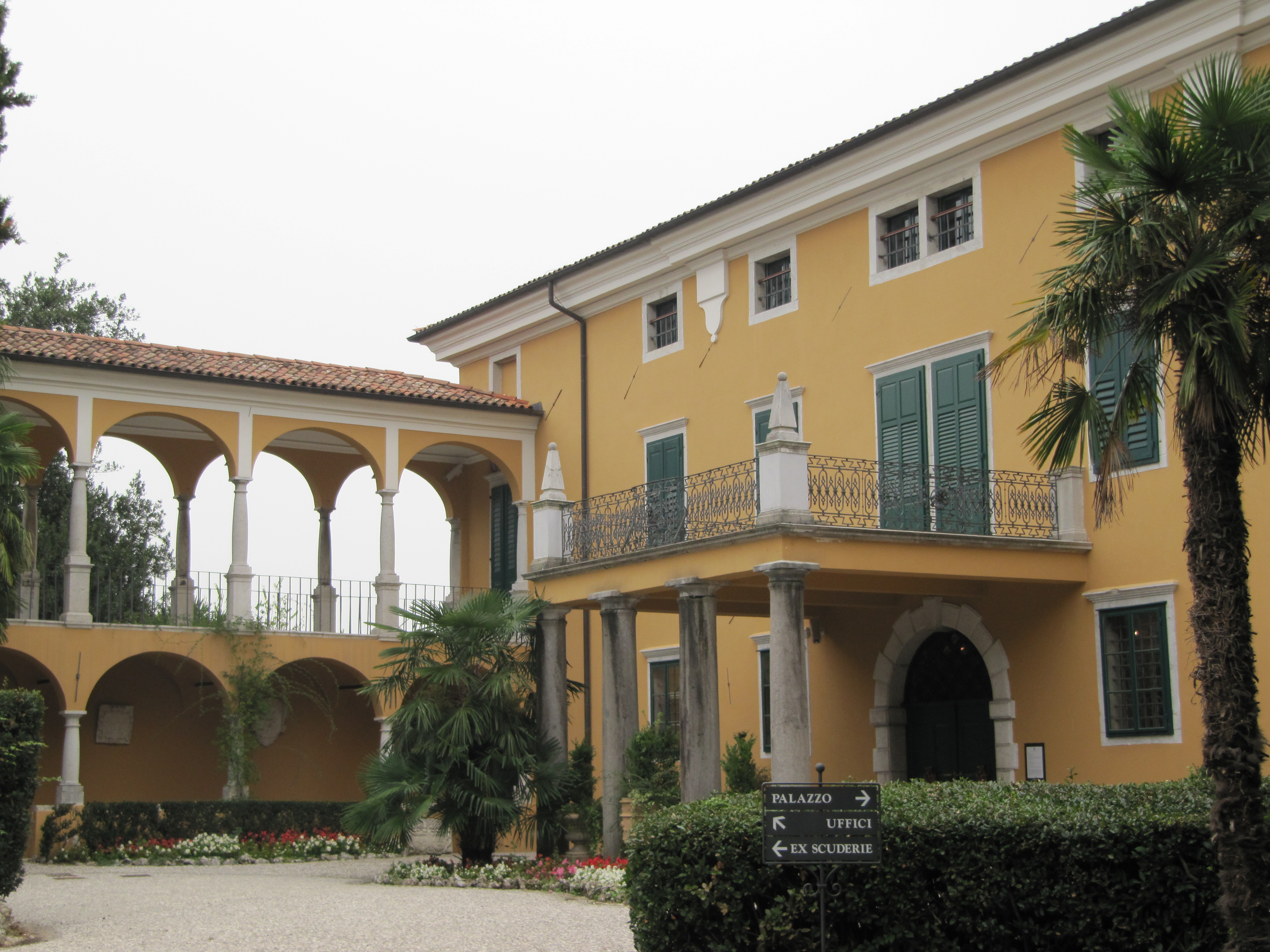
The Coronini Mansion

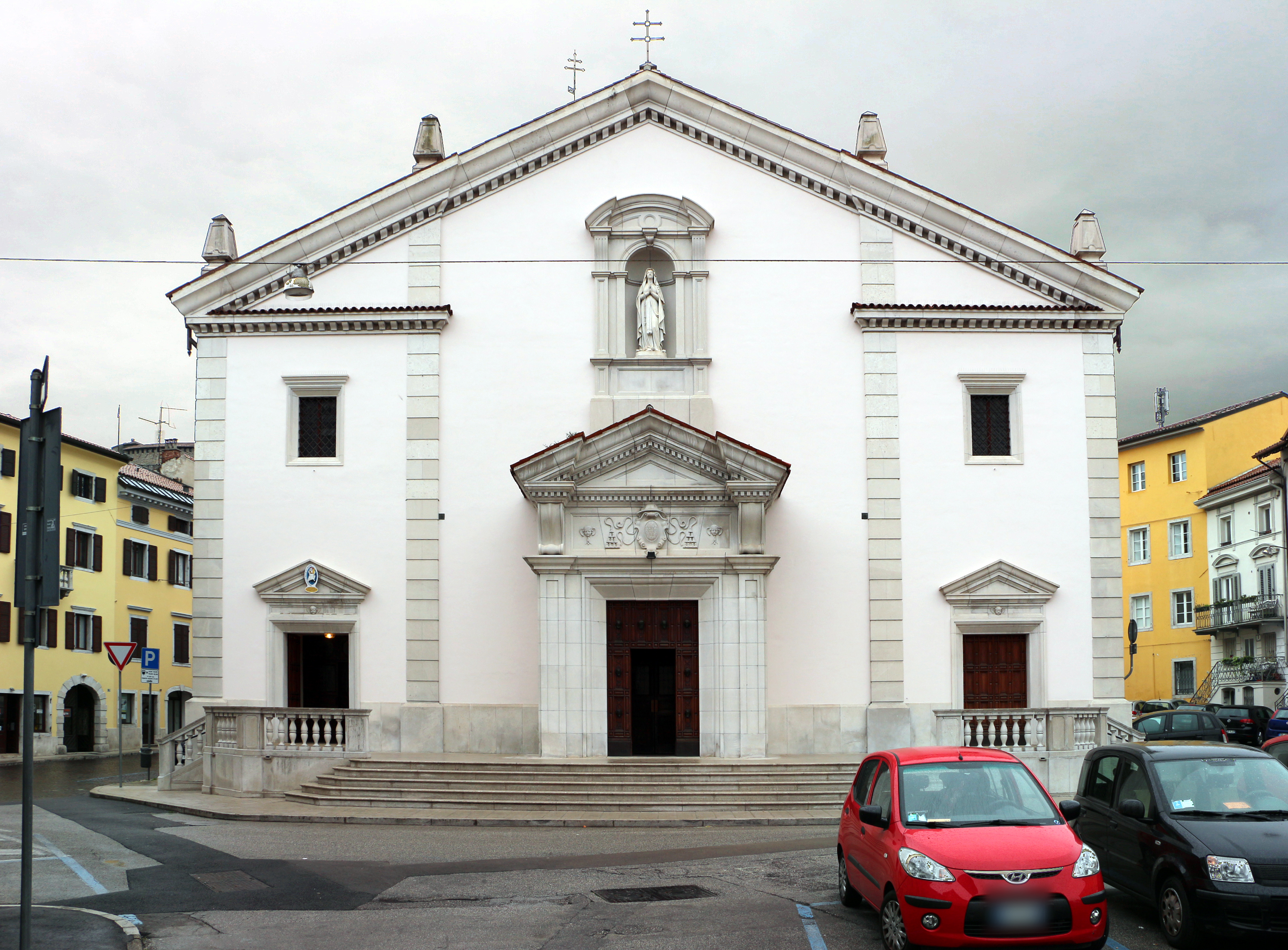
Gorizia Cathedral

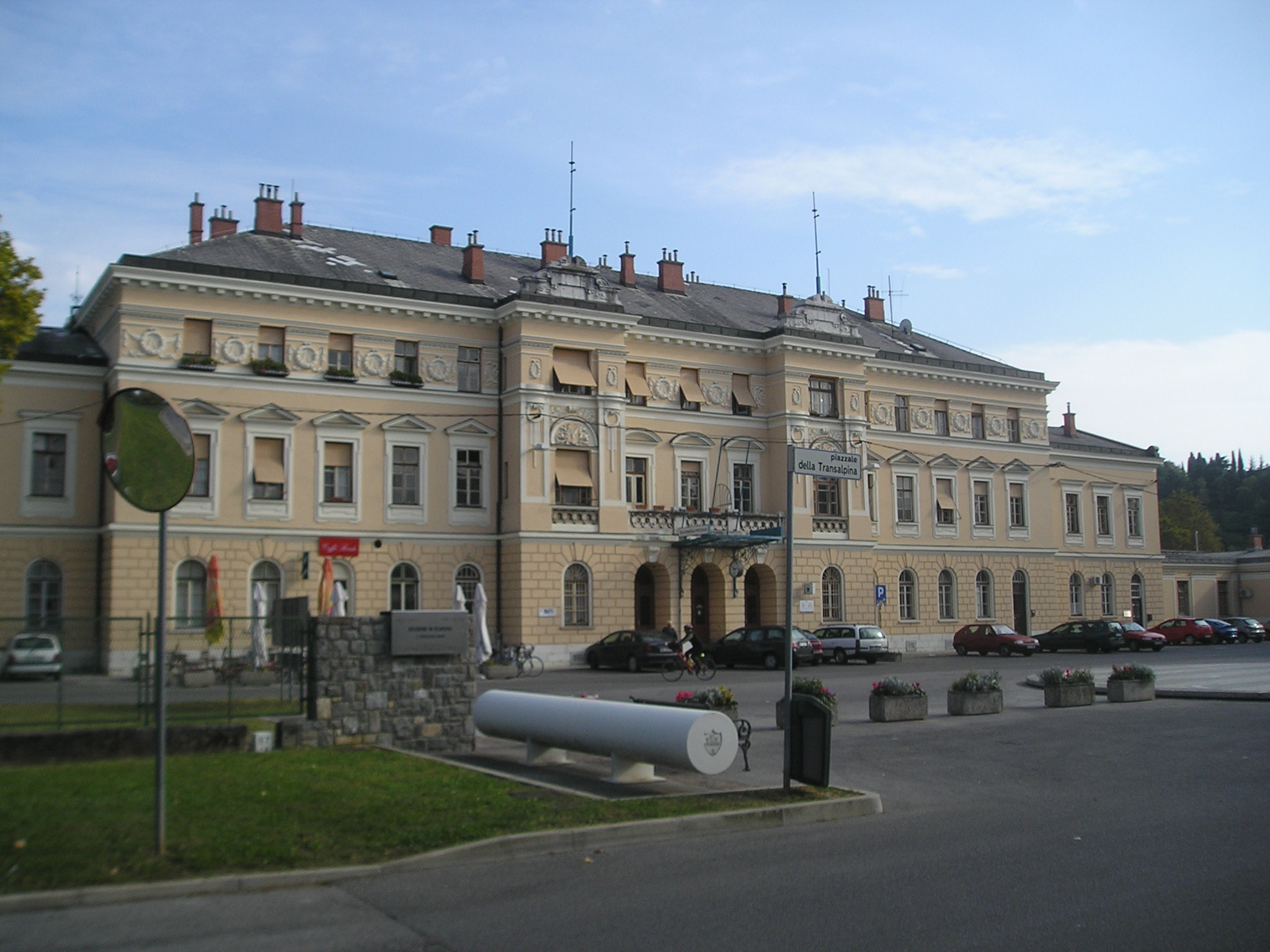
Nova Gorica railway station: old Transalpina Square

== Culture and education ==
Although the majority of the population identifies with the Italian culture, Gorizia is a center of Friulian and Slovene culture. Before 1918, the trilingual Gorizia Grammar School was one of the most important educational institutions in the Slovene Lands and for the Italians in the Austrian Littoral.

Gorizia is also the site of a choral competition, the "C. A. Seghizzi" International Choir Competition, which is a member of the European Grand Prix for Choral Singing.

== Education ==
Nowadays, Gorizia hosts several important scientific and educational institutions. The University of Trieste, the University of Udine and the University of Nova Gorica all have part of their campuses and faculties located in Gorizia.

== Sports ==
The city was host of the EuroBasket 1979.

== People ==
=== Authors ===
- France Bevk (1890–1970), writer, poet, and translator
- Andrej Budal (1889–1972), writer and translator
- Simon Gregorčič (1844–1906), poet
- Julius Kugy (1858–1944), writer and mountaineer
- Paolo Maurensig (1943–2021), novelist
- Fulvio Melia (born 1956), author
- Lorenzo Da Ponte (1749–1838), poet and librettist
- Ljubka Šorli (1910–1993), Slovenian writer, poet, teacher and anti-fascist

=== Artists and architects ===
- Federiko Benković (16671753), painter
- Emilija Bucik Razman (1935–2024), painter and illustrator: she was born in Gorizia
- Franz Caucig (1755–1828), painter
- Mihaela Adelgundis Černic (1913–2016), painter and art teacher
- Tullio Crali (1910–2000), Futurist artist
- Max Fabiani (1865–1962), architect
- Gojmir Anton Kos (1896–1970), painter
- Antonio Lasciac (1856–1946), architect
- Rodolfo Lipizer (1895–1974), violinist
- Nicolò Pacassi (1716–1790), architect
- Veno Pilon (1896–1970), painter
- Antonio Rotta (1828–1903), painter
- Avgusta Šantel (1876–1968), painter, teacher and printmaker
- Henrika Šantel (1874–1940), painter
- Carlo Tavagnutti (born 1929), photographer
- Jožef Tominc (1790–1866), painter

=== Politicians and public servants ===
- Engelbert Besednjak (1894–1968), politician
- Darko Bratina (1942–1997), Slovene–Italian politician, sociologist, and film critic
- Baron Anton von Doblhoff-Dier (1800–1872), Austrian statesman
- Carlo Favetti (1819–1892), Italian liberal nationalist politician and poet
- Josip Ferfolja (1880–1958), Slovene Social Democrat politician, lawyer, and human rights activist
- Anton Füster (1808–1881), Austrian revolutionary activist, author, and pedagogue
- Karel Lavrič (1818–1876), Slovene politician and lawyer
- Tomaž Marušič (1932–2011), Slovene politician and lawyer
- Bogumil Vošnjak (1882–1955), Yugoslav liberal politician, lawyer, and historian

=== Religious figures ===
- Anton Mahnič (1850–1920), Catholic bishop, author, and political activist
- Isaac Samuel Reggio (1784–1855), scholar and rabbi
- Tobia Lionelli (1647–1714), Franciscan friar and preacher
- Antonio Zucchelli (1663–1716), missionary in the Kingdom of Kongo

=== Scholars and scientists ===
- Graziadio Isaia Ascoli (1829–1907), linguist
- Franco Basaglia (1924–1980), psychiatrist
- Martin Baučer (1595–1668), historian
- Václav Bělohradský (born 1944), philosopher
- Lojzka Bratuž (1934–2019), Slovenian literary historian, linguist, Slavic specialist, and cultural researcher
- Milko Brezigar (1886–1958), economist
- Johannes Christian Brunnich (1866–1931), chemist
- Nello Cristianini (born 1968) scientist
- Jonathan Kaye (linguist) (born 1942), linguist
- Milko Kos (1892–1972), historian
- Branko Marušič (born 1938), historian
- Pietro Andrea Mattioli (1501–1577), naturalist
- Fulvio Melia (born 1956), astrophysicist
- Carlo Michelstaedter (1887–1910), philosopher
- Avgust Pirjevec (1887–1944), literary historian and librarian
- Carlo Rubbia (born 1934), physicist and Nobel laureate
- Jožko Šavli (1943–2011), historian
- Vladimir Truhlar (1912–1977), poet and theologian

=== Sports people ===
- Paolo Camossi (born 1974), triple jumper
- Matej Černič (born 1978), volleyball player
- Barbara Lah (born 1972), triple jumper
- Armen Petrosyan (born 1986), kickboxer
- Giorgio Petrosyan (born 1985), kickboxer
- Gianmarco Pozzecco (born 1972), basketball player
- Edoardo Reja (born 1945), football coach and player
- Sergio Susmel (1923–1978), football player
- Luca Tomasig (born 1983), football player
- Francesco Vida (1903–1984), military officer and skier
- Paolo Vidoz (born 1970), boxer
- Elnardo Webster (born 1969), American football player

=== Others ===
- Damjana Bratuž (1927–2025), pianist, music educator, and university professor
- Lojze Bratuž (1902–1937), composer and anti-Fascist martyr
- Lucy Christalnigg (1872–1914), Red Cross worker
- Charles X of France (1757–1836), last Bourbon king of France
- Ferdo Delak (1905–1968), stage director
- Nora Gregor (1901–1949), actress
- Sergej Mašera (1912–1941), lieutenant in the Yugoslav Royal Navy and People's Hero of Yugoslavia
- Friderika Podgornik (1880–1948), Slovenian pianist and music educator
- Arturo Reggio (1863–1917), chess master
- Edvard Rusjan (1886–1911), aircraft constructor and pilot
- Karl von Scherzer (1821–1903), explorer and natural scientist
- Danica Šantel (1887–1921), teacher, amateur artist, and artist's model

=== Notable citizens ===
- Carlo Rubbia (born 1934), particle physicist; recipient of the Nobel Prize in Physics (1984); born in Gorizia.
- Carlo Michelstaedter (1887–1910), philosopher and poet; born and died in Gorizia, regarded as one of the city's most influential intellectual figures of the early 20th century.
- Nora Gregor (1901–1949), stage and film actress; born in Gorizia, later active in major European cinematic circles.
- Max Fabiani (1865–1962), architect and urban planner; closely associated with Gorizia's architectural development and post–World War I reconstruction; died in the city.
- Joža Lovrenčič (1890–1952), Slovene poet, editor, and translator; associated with Gorizia through his education and his work as a teacher and cultural figure in Slovene institutions of the city.

=== Honorary citizens ===
- Benito Mussolini (1883-1945), politician, journalist and Duce of Italian fascism

== International relations ==
=== Twin towns – sister cities ===
Gorizia is twinned with:

- Klagenfurt, Austria
- Lienz, Austria
- Grosseto, Italy
- Sassari, Italy
- Zalaegerszeg, Hungary
- Venlo, Netherlands

== See also ==
- Roman Catholic Archdiocese of Gorizia
- Gorizia Castle
- Gorizia Centrale railway station
- A.S. Pro Gorizia
