= Ajševica =

- Location in Slovenia
- Coordinates: 45°56′51.22″N 13°41′37.04″E
- Country: Slovenia
- Traditional region: Slovenian Littoral
- Statistical region: Gorizia
- Municipality: Nova Gorica

Area
  - Total: 2.93 km^{2} (1.13 sq mi)
- Elevation: 83.7 m (275 ft)

Population (2002)
  - Total: 261

Ajševica (pronounced [ˈaːi̯ʃɛʋitsa]; Italian: Aisovizza) is a settlement in western Slovenia in the Municipality of Nova Gorica. It has a population of 261. It is closely linked to the nearby settlements of Kromberk and Loke, which together form a single district in the municipality of Nova Gorica, which is de facto one of the four suburbs of the town of Nova Gorica (together with Solkan, Rožna Dolina, and Pristava). It includes the hamlets of Parkovšče, Gmajna, and Mandrija.

== Geography ==
Ajševica is a dispersed settlement in the low-lying Lijak Basin (Slovene: Lijaško polje) to the east and on the slope of Panovec Hill to the west. Lijak Creek, which is subject to flash floods, rises northeast of the village from a spring on the slope of the Trnovo Forest Plateau (Slovene: Trnovski gozd). Lijak Creek is fed by Globočnik Creek, which flows from Kromberk. There are springs with potable water in Gmajna. On the slopes to the southwest, toward Stara Gora, there are tilled fields, orchards, and vineyards.

== History ==
Ajševica was bisected by the Morgan Line after the Second World War. In 1947, the upper course of Lijak Creek was regulated to prevent flooding. Water mains were installed in the village in 1965.
