= Friderika Podgornik =

- Born: Friederika Podgornik; 1880; Gorizia, Austria-Hungary
- Died: October 1948 (aged 67–68); Vienna, Austria
- Occupations: pianist, music educator
- Parent: Lucilla Theresia Anna Tolomei (Lucilla Tolomei Podgornik) (mother)

Friderika Podgornik, also known as Friederike Hermuth, (1880 – October 1948) was a Slovenian pianist and music educator. She had a successful concert career in Vienna.

== Childhood and education ==
She was born in 1880 in Gorizia into a Slovene- and German-speaking family. Her mother was the Austrian pianist and composer Lucilla Theresia Anna Tolomei (1854–1937), known as Lucilla Tolomei Podgornik, and her father was the Slovenian journalist Franc Podgornik (1846–1904). She was the eldest of five children, two daughters and three sons. She learned the piano from her mother. Despite her foreign origin, her mother contributed greatly to musical life in the Slovene lands and also wrote articles about Slovene music for Slovene newspapers. In September 1890 she moved with her family to Trieste. Friderika thus grew up in a trilingual environment. Her mother spoke German, her father Slovene, and most of her mother’s pupils were of Italian origin. Her mother also had invitations to her concerts printed in three languages, for which she was smeared in newspapers and even boycotted by Italian as well as Slovene nationalists. In 1895 she moved with her family to Vienna.

== Work ==
Soon after arriving in Vienna she began giving concerts with her mother, and later also independently. She also participated in music festivals. She mostly performed Bach. She collaborated with various artists. Between 1903 and 1906, she and her mother performed in Vienna with the first Austrian Danish quartet, consisting of the singers Fani Čampa, Marija Čampa, Frieda Perner and Amalija Čampa. After the retirement of Marija, Frieda and Amalija, Friderika Podgornik continued to collaborate with Fani. Before the WW I she traveled to Buenos Aires, where she had a successful concert career. In 1922 she and her mother planned to move to Berlin to join treir brother and son Pavel. To make it easier to settle in Berlin, she and her mother Germanised their surname to Hermuth, as Pavel had already done in 1912. Due to circumstances, they later did not move to Berlin but remained in Vienna. In 1928 she moved again to Argentina, where she worked as a successful piano professor, but after a few years she returned to Vienna.

== Later life and death ==
After returning from Argentina, she lived in Vienna with her mother and supported herself as a piano teacher. She never married and had no children. After her mother’s death in 1937 she lived alone. She died in October 1948 in Vienna of cardiac arrest.
