= Gorizia Courthouse =

Building in Gorizia, Italy

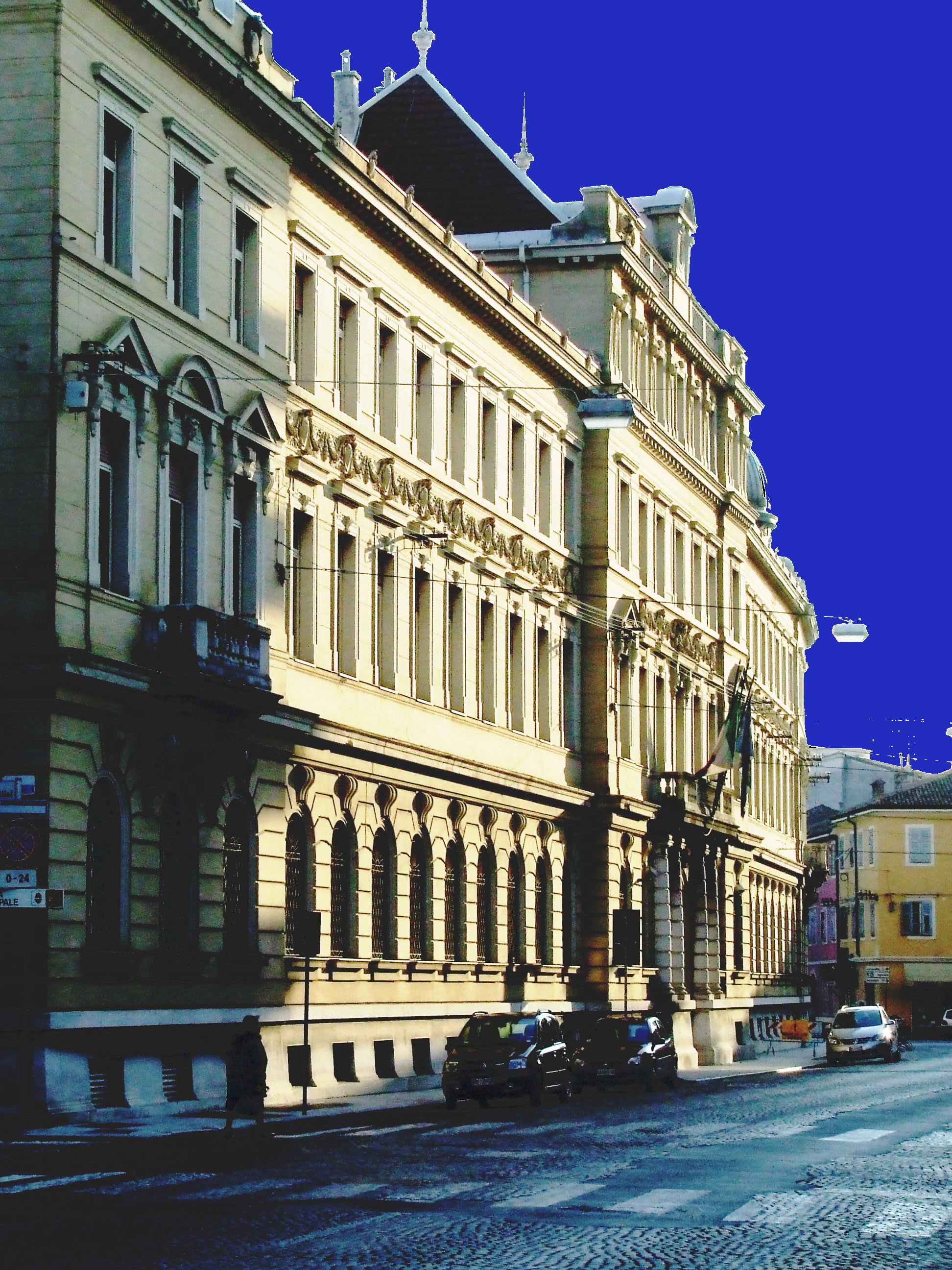
- Interactive map of the Gorizia Courthouse area

General information
- Location: Gorizia, Friuli-Venezia Giulia, Italy
- Coordinates: 45°56′25.47″N 13°37′15.14″E
- Construction started: 1899
- Completed: 1902

Design and construction
- Architect: Josef Wojtechowsky

The Gorizia Courthouse (Palazzo di Giustizia, or Palazzo del Tribunale) is a building located on Via Nazario Sauro in Gorizia, Italy.

== History ==
The courthouse in Gorizia was built between 1899 and 1902 on the site of the former customs house, located at the corner between Via Nazario Sauro and Via Fabio Filzi. The building was designed by Polish engineer Josef Wojtechowsky, who was directly commissioned by the Viennese government. Its construction was part of a broader initiative by the Austro-Hungarian Empire to modernize infrastructure in its provincial cities.

The palace was conceived as a standardized public building, following architectural models already used in other Central European cities. From the very beginning, it served a dual function as a courthouse and a prison. During World War I, it was temporarily repurposed as the headquarters of the Austrian military command. Today, it remains the official Palace of Justice of Gorizia and houses the city's penitentiary.

== Description ==
The building is one of the finest examples of Austro-Hungarian eclectic architecture in Gorizia. Monumental, compact, and symmetrical in form, the structure is organized around internal courtyards and composed of interconnected building wings, following a rational and functional layout.

The front on Via Sauro is linear and symmetrical, featuring the main entrance, which is marked by rusticated Doric half-columns, ornamental brackets, and a balustraded balcony. Unlike the main front, the side on Via Filzi follows the polygonal curve of the street, animated by projections and balconies that give it a dynamic appearance while still maintaining a consistent rhythm of openings.

The two façades are connected at the corner by a cylindrical tower, topped with a copper-clad onion dome—a clear nod to Central European architectural traditions. Originally, the dome featured the coat of arms of the County of Gorizia, which was later replaced by the Savoy cross and eventually removed after World War II. The façades are finished in a yellow ochre plaster, enriched with detailed relief decorations including friezes, pediments, cornices, stringcourses, and floral garlands. The windows vary by floor, both in shape and decoration.

Structurally, the building is made of brick masonry, with steel beams used to span the larger interior spaces. The roof is covered with Marseilles tiles, and the base of the building, along the street fronts, is clad in Aurisina stone.

== Sources ==
- Tavano, Sergio (2009). Architettura goriziana negli anni del liberty. Gorizia: Circolo Fotografico Isontino.
- Tavano, Sergio (1992). "Architettura a Gorizia, 1890-1990". Ce fastu?. No. 2.
- Zorzut, Fulvia (1988). Le trasformazioni urbane e architettoniche nella Gorizia ottocentesca. 1860-1914. Gorizia: CaRiGo.
