= Andrej Budal =

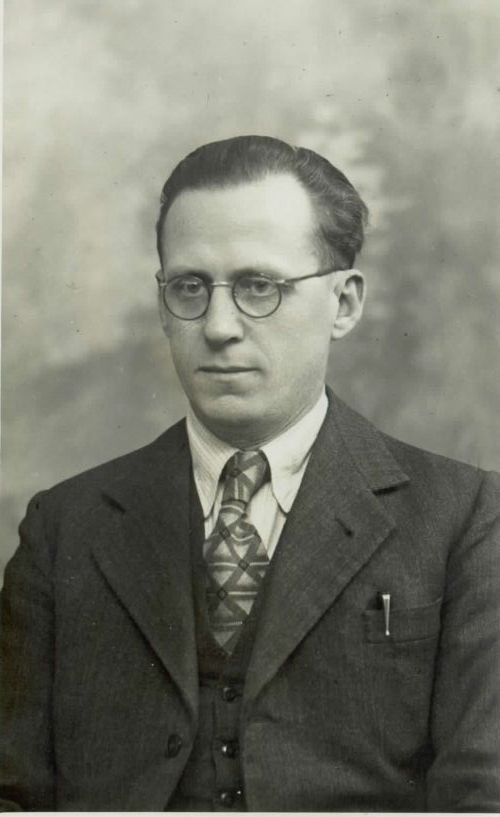
Andrej Budal in 1940

Andrej Budal (31 October 1889 – 7 June 1972) was a Slovene-language writer, poet, journalist, and translator from Italy.

He was born in Gorizia, in the Slovene-inhabited suburban district of Sant'Andrea (Slovene: Štandrež), in what was then the Austro-Hungarian Empire (now in Italy). He studied Romance languages at the University of Vienna, obtaining his PhD in 1913. After World War I, he moved back to his native Slovene Littoral, which had been annexed to Italy, and was administered as part of the Julian March (Venezia Giulia) region. He worked as professor of French in high schools in Gorizia, Idrija, Tolmin, Udine, Perugia and Venice.

Together with France Bevk, Budal was one of the very few Slovene authors which remained in Italy after the Fascist takeover in 1922. Due to the policies of Fascist Italianization, he was forced to publish most of his works under various pseudonyms in Slovene journals in the neighbouring Kingdom of Yugoslavia. In the late 1920s, Budal emerged as a prolific author of short stories, mostly published in the literary magazine Ljubljanski zvon from Ljubljana.

After World War II, he was included in the Yugoslav diplomatic delegation at the Paris Peace Conference which decided the new border between Italy and Yugoslavia. After the establishment of the Free Territory of Trieste in 1947, Budal moved to Trieste, where he became the director of the Slovene-language theatre.

He was also famous for his translations of French Italian authors to Slovene. Among others, he translated Alessandro Manzoni's The Betrothed, Boccaccio's Decameron, and short stories by Grazia Deledda and Guy de Maupassant.

He died in Trieste.
