= Carlo Tavagnutti =

Italian photographer (born 1929)

- Born: 1929 (age 96–97); Gorizia, Italy
- Occupation: Photographer

Carlo Tavagnutti (born 1929 in Gorizia, Italy) is an Italian photographer who, for over 50 years, has taken pictures of landscapes and architecture. He specialises in black-and-white mountain landscapes.

== Selected works ==
- Julische Alpen (1978)
- Tricorno 1778–1978 (1978)
- Ostliche Dolomiten (1979)
- Alpi Giulie Occidentali (1983)
- Il Carso Isontino (1984)
- Dalla vita di un alpinista (1985)
- Le arti a Gorizia nel secondo '900 (1987)
- Il mito del paesaggio nella fotografia del Novecentro in Friuli (1988)
- Isonzo (1991)
- Giovanni Paolo II in F.V.G. (1992)
- Collio (1993)
- Sui sentieri del F.V.G. (1997)
- II F.V.G e i suoi grandi vini (1997)
- Volo con L'aquila (1998)

== General references ==
- Volo con l'aquila (book), written by Celso Macor with photography by Carlo Tavagnutti (1998)
