= Srpenica =

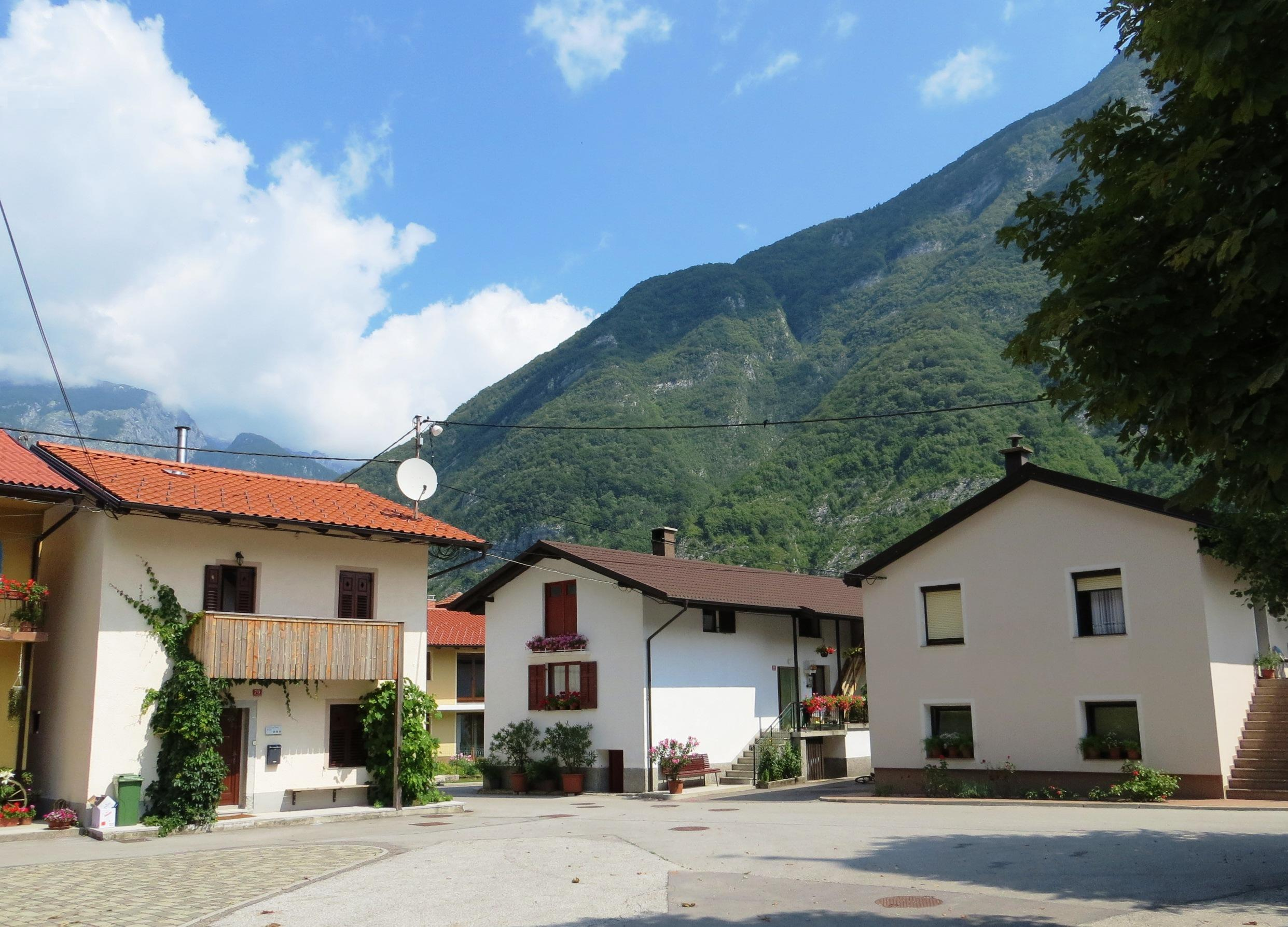

- Location in Slovenia
- Coordinates: 46°17′28.42″N 13°29′57.24″E
- Country: Slovenia
- Traditional region: Slovenian Littoral
- Statistical region: Gorizia
- Municipality: Bovec

Area
  - Total: 13.23 km^{2} (5.11 sq mi)
- Elevation: 363.9 m (1,194 ft)

Population (2020)
  - Total: 175
  - Density: 13.2/km^{2} (34.3/sq mi)

Srpenica (pronounced [səɾpɛˈniːtsa]; Italian: Serpenizza) is a village on the right bank of the Soča River in the Municipality of Bovec in the Littoral region of Slovenia. It includes the hamlet of Brezovo, which was abandoned after the Second World War.

== Name ==
Srpenica was attested in written records in 1496 as Sterpeniza. The name is probably derived from a Romance reflex of the Latin word stirps 'tree, bush, root', which is preserved in Italian sterpo 'bushes, roots that have died off' and in Ladin šterp 'brambles, brush litter'. A less likely theory derives the name from the Ladin common noun stirpe 'sterile cow'.

== History ==
From the mid-18th century onward, many residents of the village made a living by peddling. Others traditionally worked outside the village as seasonal labor. Nearly the entire village was destroyed by a fire in 1905, after which 10 houses were not rebuilt. Before the First World War, there were nine inns in the village. The village was not destroyed like others in the area during the First World War, although houses in poor condition were razed by the military and the narrowest streets were widened. During the war, the entire population was evacuated to Piedmont, from which they returned in 1919. After the Second World War, many of the residents emigrated, resulting in several abandoned and decaying houses in the village.

== Church ==
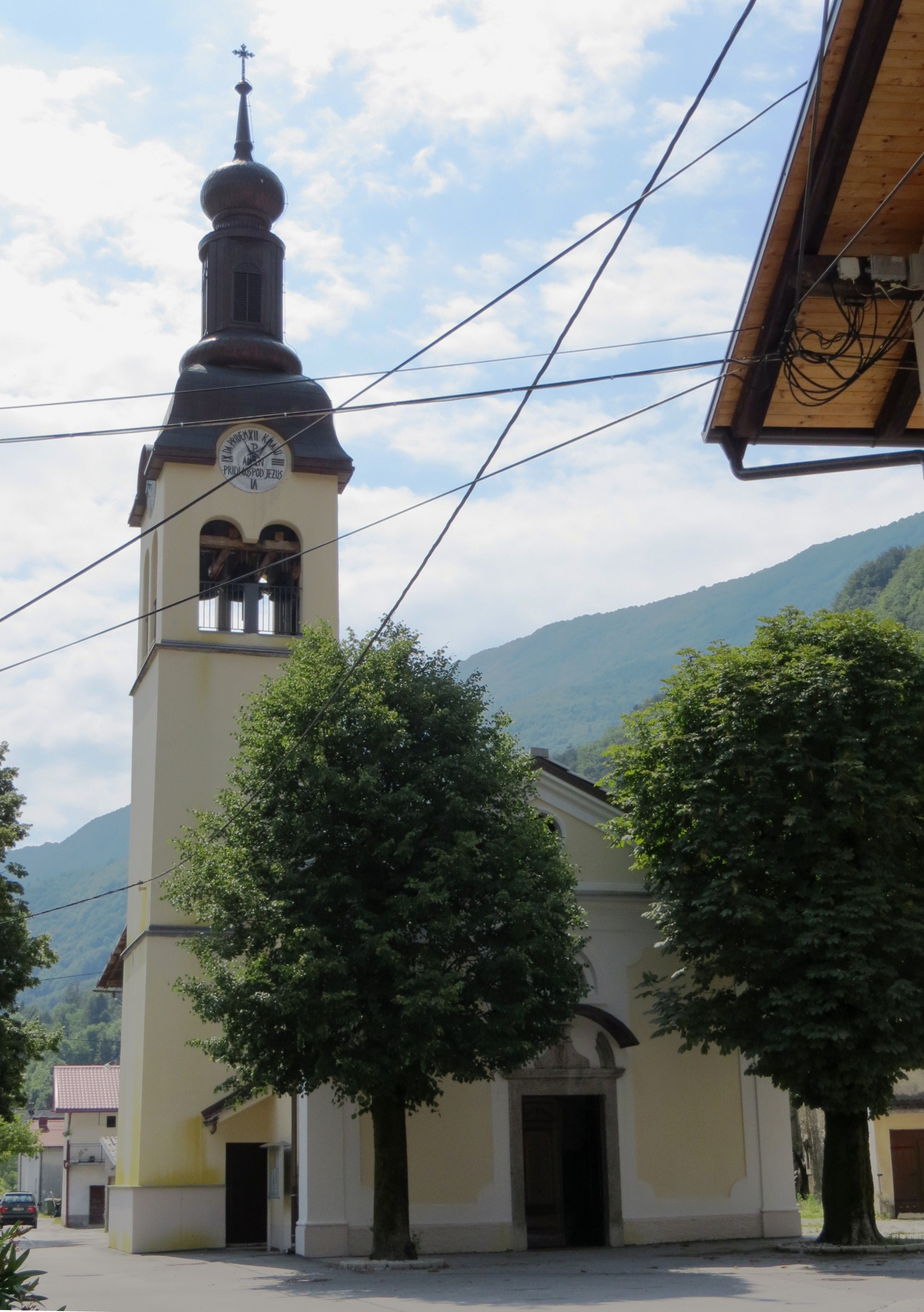
View from northwest

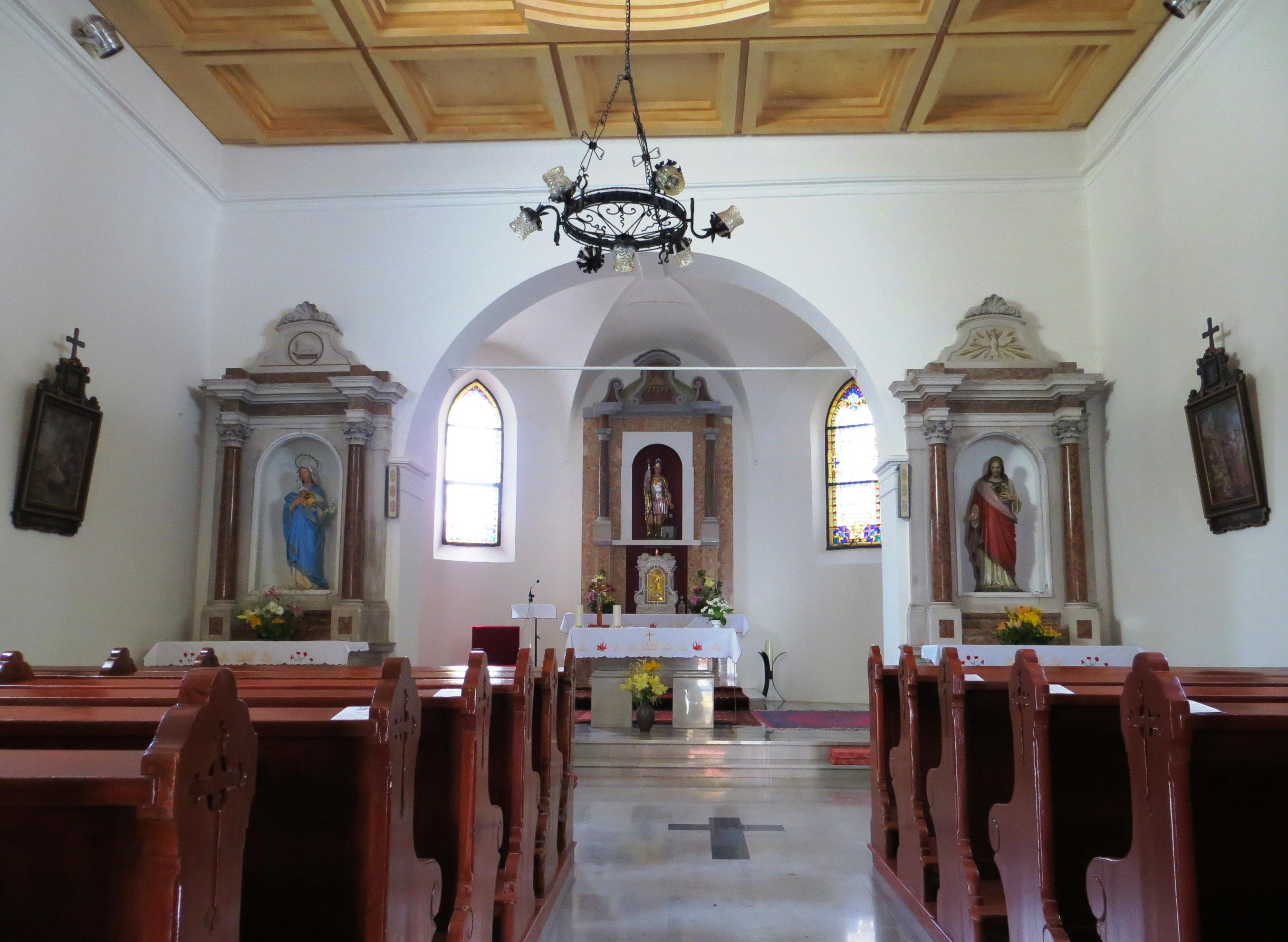
Church interior

Saint Florian's Church

The parish church in the settlement is dedicated to Saint Florian. The church stands in the center of the village and was built in 1755 following plans by the architect Janez Valentinčič. An earlier structure at the site was built after 1474. The church has a polygonal chancel walled on three sides, a rectangular nave, and a bell tower on the north wall of the nave.

== Cultural heritage ==
In addition to Saint Florian's Church, other sites in Srpenica are registered as cultural heritage:

- The Ograjenica archaeological site is a flat urnfield burial site from the Hallstatt culture.
- A monument to Countess Lucy Christalnigg was installed in 1914. The countess was the first victim of the First World War on Slovenian soil, and was shot on 10 August 1914. The monument is a stone cross on a stone base, and it stands southeast of the village, along the road to Trnovo ob Soči. Her husband had the monument erected before the Battles of the Isonzo began.
- A World War II monument in the village was designed by Nataša Štupar Šumi and Jože Plečnik. It consists of a pillar on a stone block with a cone-shaped top. The names of fallen Partisan soldiers are carved into it, topped by four stone wreaths. The monument was unveiled on 21 September 1951.
- A pillar shrine stands northwest of the village, along the road to Žaga. It is square and covered by a metal square hip roof. Its niche contains a statue of Saint Florian. The shrine dates from circa 1900.

== Notable people ==
Notable people that were born or lived in Srpenica include:

- Danilo Fajgelj (1840–1908), organist and composer (school principal in Srpenica, 1888–1898)
- Anton Melihen (1892–1918), leader of a mutiny in Bad Radkersburg against the Austrian authorities

== Gallery ==
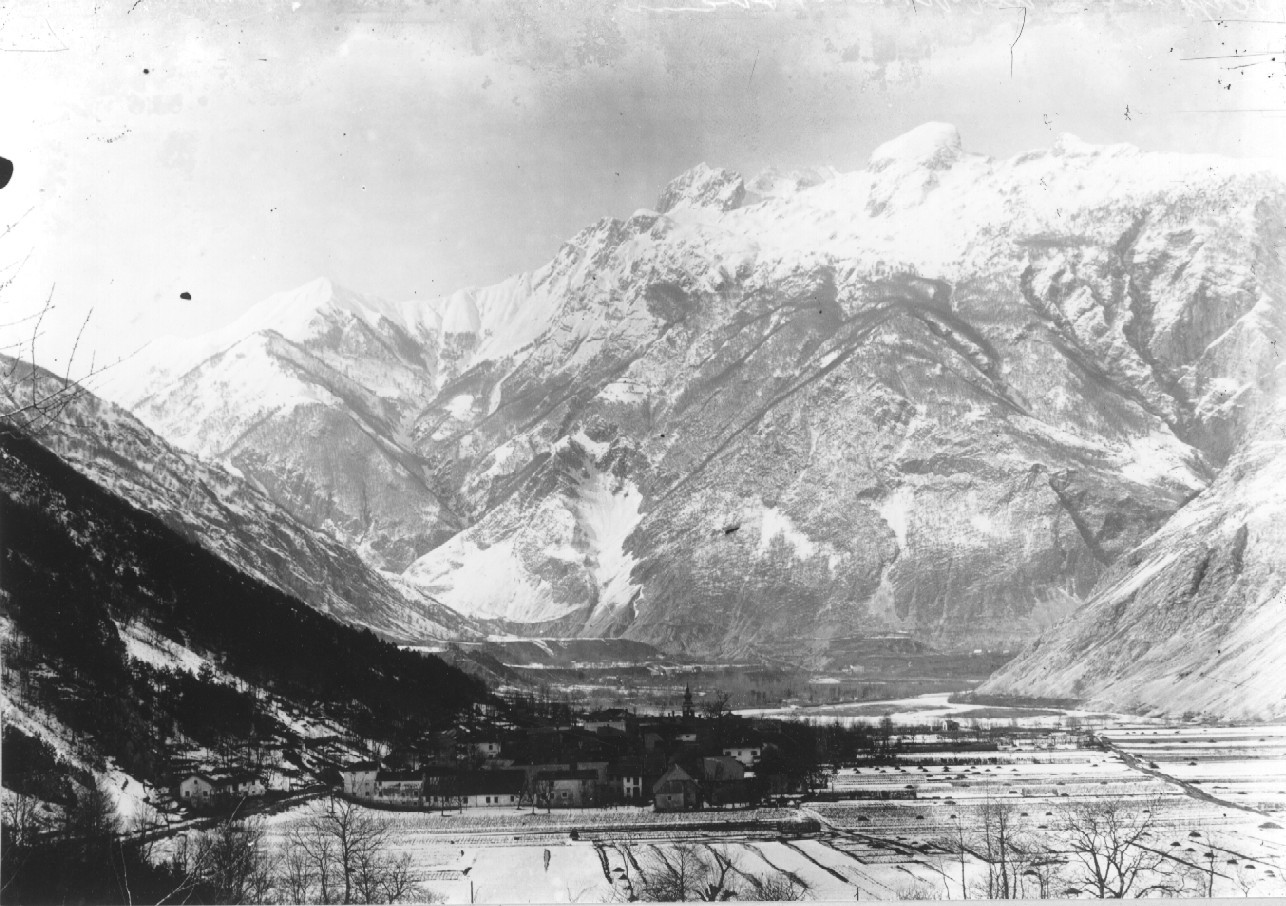
Srpenica with Mount Kanin
