= Pristava, Nova Gorica =

Pristava Rafut
- Location in Slovenia
- Coordinates: 45°56′53.55″N 13°38′6.9″E
- Country: Slovenia
- Traditional region: Slovenian Littoral
- Statistical region: Gorizia
- Municipality: Nova Gorica

Area
  - Total: 0.47 km^{2} (0.18 sq mi)
- Elevation: 105.3 m (345 ft)

Population (2002)
  - Total: 361

Pristava (pronounced [pɾiˈstaːʋa]; Italian: Prestava, Friulian: Rafût, German: Prestau), also known locally as Rafut (pronounced [ɾaˈfuːt]), is one of the four suburbs of the town of Nova Gorica in the Gorizia region of western Slovenia (the other three are Solkan, Rožna Dolina, and Kromberk).

== History ==
Between the late 18th century and 1947, it used to be a suburb of the town of Gorizia (now in Italy). When the city was partitioned in 1947, most of the city center remained in Italy, while its eastern suburbs were annexed to Yugoslavia. Part of Pristava (Rafut) remained in Italy, and while part of it became part of Slovenia. In some cases, the border was drawn literally between individual houses. Until Slovenia's entry into the Schengen zone in 2007, a local border crossing operated in Pristava.

== Monastery ==
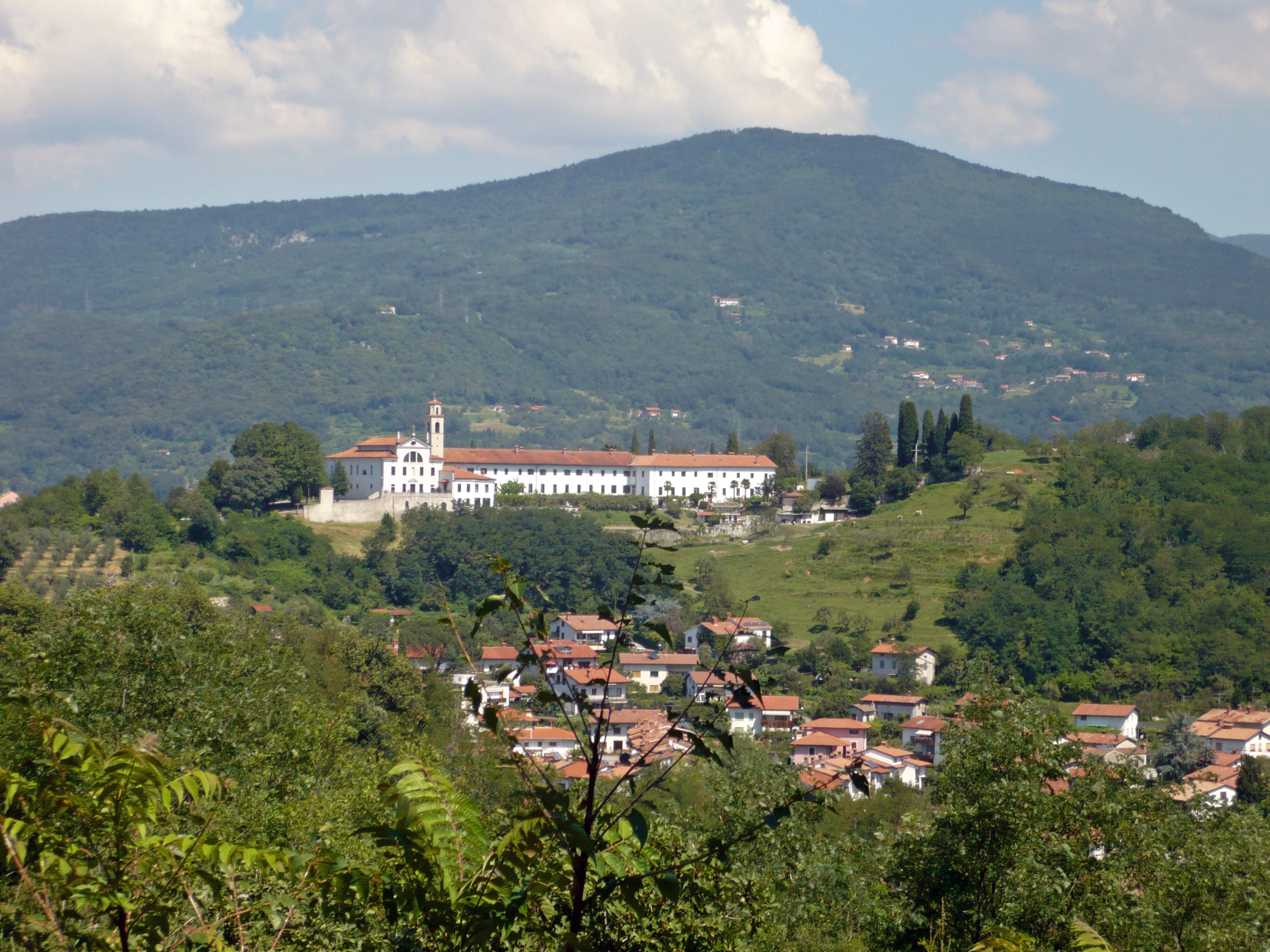
The Kostanjevica Monastery seen from Gorizia Castle

The Kostanjevica Monastery, in which Charles X of France is buried, is located on a hill above the settlement.
