= Lucy Christalnigg =

Countess Lucy Christalnigg von und zu Gillitzstein (née Bellegarde; 24 June 1872 in Klingenstein (Note: Then in the Kingdom of Württemberg, now part of Blaustein, Baden-Württemberg, Germany.) – 10 August 1914 in Srpenica) (Note: Then in the County of Gorizia and Gradisca, now in Slovenia.) was the wife of Count Oskar Christalnigg, a Carinthian aristocrat and Slovene patriot.

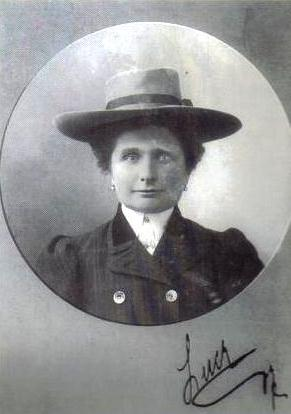
Lucy Christalnigg (1872-1914)

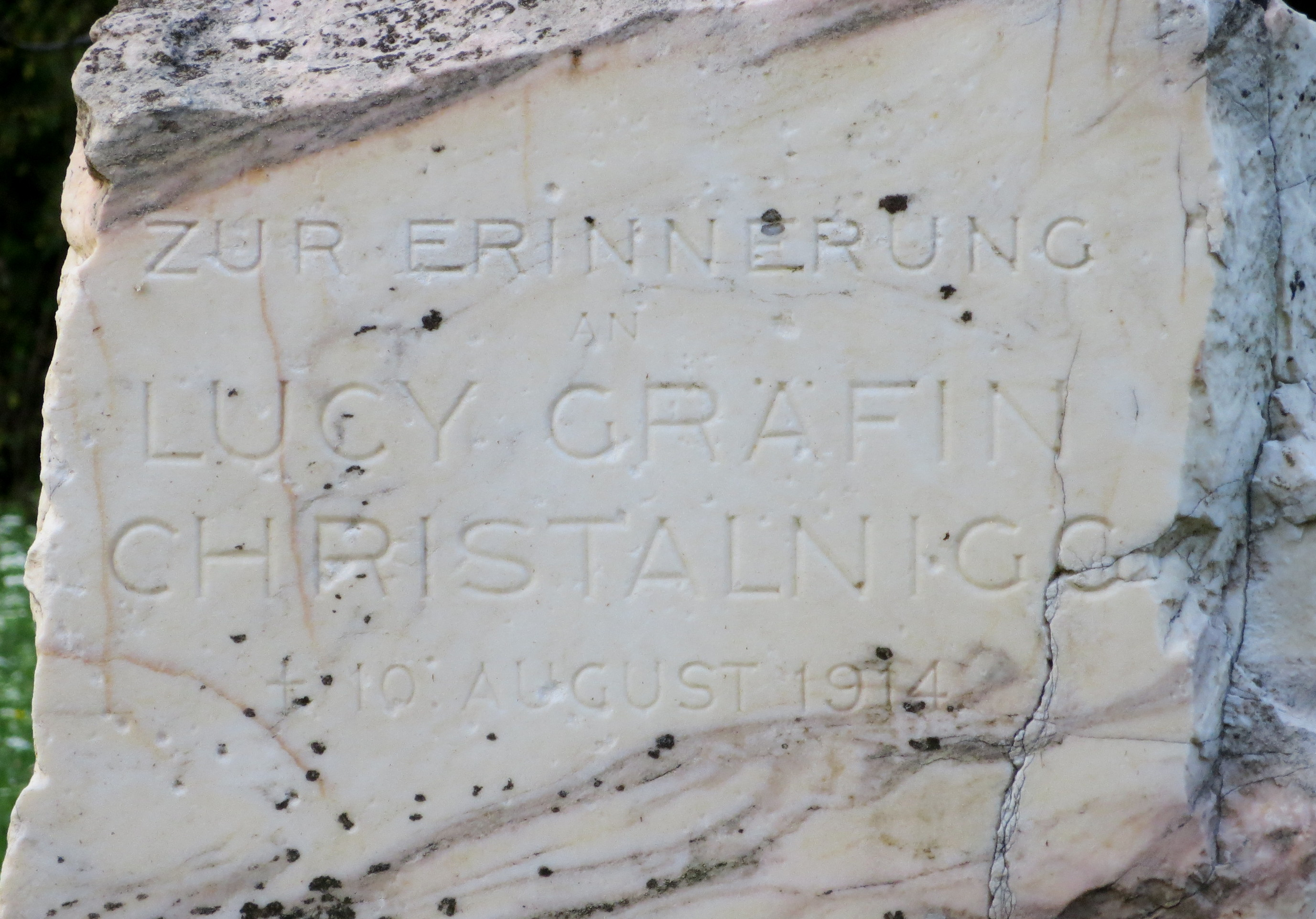
Inscription in Srpenica commemorating Lucy Christalnigg

She was one of the first female drivers in the Austro-Hungarian Monarchy, living sometimes in Klagenfurt (now in Austria) and sometimes in Gorizia (now in Italy). She was also a racing driver, winning the 1907 Wanderpreis of the Carinthian Automobile Club in an Itala car. She became the first victim on the World War I Isonzo Front when she was shot (possibly by mistake) by Landsturmer guards on 10 August 1914 at a checkpoint in Srpenica (near Bovec) while on a mission for the Red Cross.

Her story was largely forgotten, and was reconstructed in 2014 from primary sources by Nello Cristianini in the book The Last Summer. Since then, her story has been covered by television and newspapers, and in 2015 she was second in a contest organised by the Kleine Zeitung of Klagenfurt to choose the name of a new street in the town of St. Veit.

She is buried in St. Michael am Zollfeld, Austria. A monument stands on the place of her death, in Srpenica, and a documentary by TV Capodistria tells her story.
