= Loke, Nova Gorica =

Loke
- Location in Slovenia
- Coordinates: 45°57′31.76″N 13°42′38.32″E
- Country: Slovenia
- Traditional region: Slovenian Littoral
- Statistical region: Gorizia
- Municipality: Nova Gorica

Area
  - Total: 3.52 km^{2} (1.36 sq mi)
- Elevation: 168 m (551 ft)

Population (2002)
  - Total: 256

Loke (pronounced [ˈloːkɛ]; Italian: Locca) is a dispersed settlement in the Municipality of Nova Gorica in western Slovenia. It is located on the lowest edge of the Vipava Valley, just beneath the high Trnovo Forest Plateau (Slovene: Trnovski gozd). It is a satellite settlement of Kromberk, one of the four suburbs of Nova Gorica.

The local church is dedicated to Mary Magdalene and belongs to the Parish of Kromberk.
