= Rožna Dolina =

- Location in Slovenia
- Coordinates: 45°56′32.93″N 13°38′22.92″E
- Country: Slovenia
- Traditional region: Slovenian Littoral
- Statistical region: Gorizia
- Municipality: Nova Gorica

Area
  - Total: 7.63 km^{2} (2.95 sq mi)
- Elevation: 87.6 m (287 ft)

Population (2002)
  - Total: 1,091

Rožna Dolina (pronounced [ˈɾoːʒna dɔˈliːna]; Italian: Valdirose, German: Rosenthal) is one of the four suburbs of the town of Nova Gorica in western Slovenia (the others being Solkan, Kromberk, and Pristava). It is on the border with Italy. Before 1947, it used to be a suburb of the town of Gorizia, which was left to Italy in the Paris Peace Conference of February 1947.

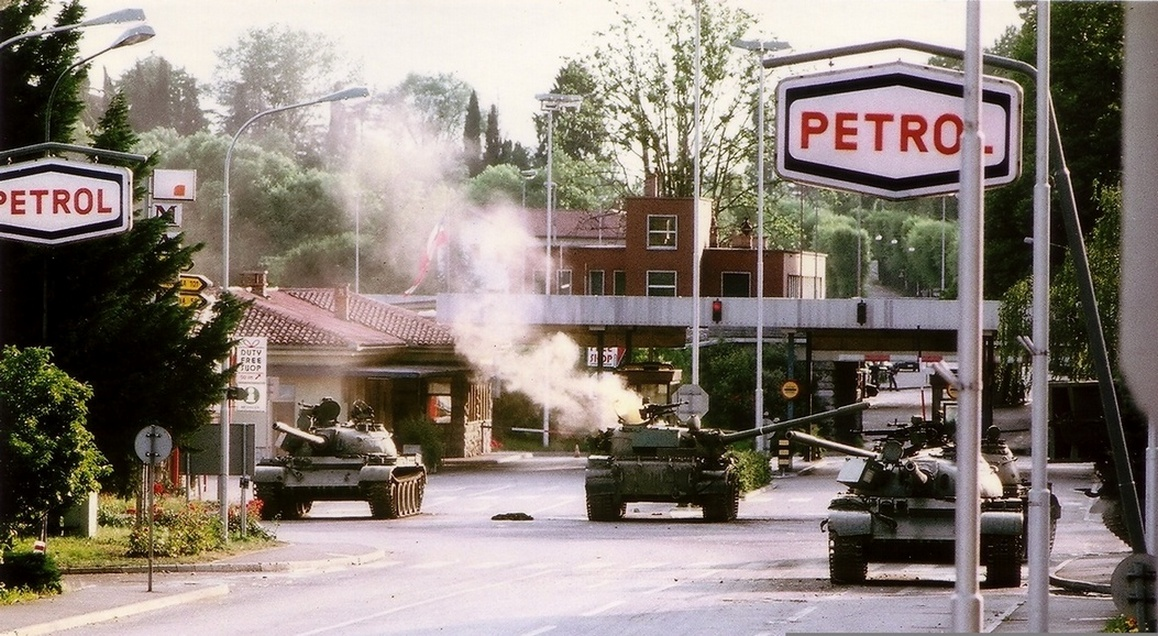
Slovenian forces attacking a tank near the Rožna Dolina international border crossing, 1991

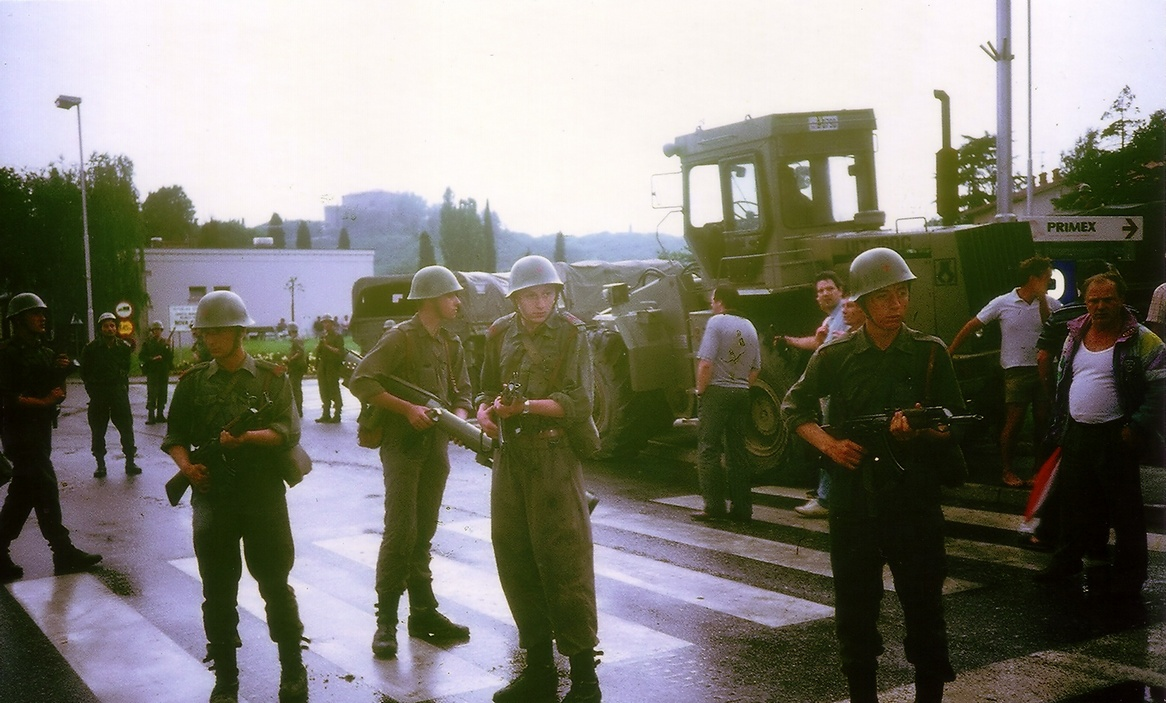
Soldiers of the Yugoslav People's Army and civilians before clash of arms in Rožna Dolina in 1991

It was the site of one of the major engagements in the Ten-Day War for the independence of Slovenia in June 1991.

The University of Nova Gorica is located in Rožna Dolina.

The largest Jewish cemetery in Slovenia and one of the largest in the Alpe-Adria region is located in Rožna Dolina. Among other graves, it contains the tomb of the Italian philosopher Carlo Michelstaedter.

Lucy Christalnigg, first victim on the Isonzo Front, was a resident of Rožna Dolina. She was on her way back to Rožna Dolina in August 1914, when she was shot by two Landsturm guards at a roadblock.
