= Kromberk =

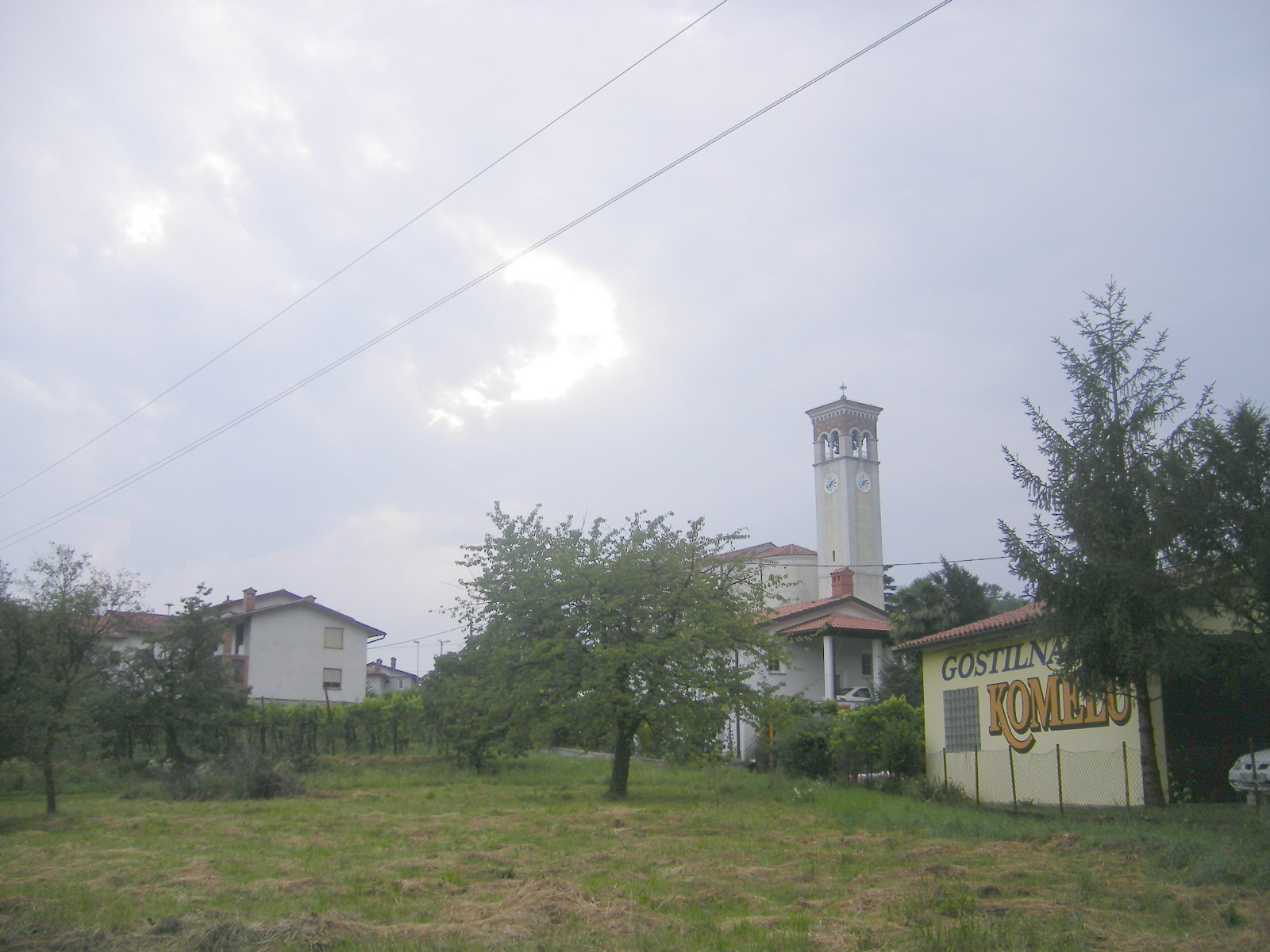
- Virgin Mary Comforter of the Afflicted Parish Church

- Location in Slovenia
- Coordinates: 45°57′32.94″N 13°40′6.88″E
- Country: Slovenia
- Traditional region: Slovenian Littoral
- Statistical region: Gorizia
- Municipality: Nova Gorica

Area
  - Total: 8.94 km^{2} (3.45 sq mi)
- Elevation: 135.4 m (444 ft)

Population (2002)
  - Total: 1,820

Kromberk (pronounced [ˈkɾoːmbɛɾk]; Italian: Moncorona, German: Cronberg bei Görz) is a settlement in the Municipality of Nova Gorica in western Slovenia. Together with its two satellite settlements of Ajševica and Loke, it forms one of the four major suburbs of Nova Gorica (the others being Solkan, Rožna Dolina, and Pristava).

== Name ==
Kromberk was attested in written sources circa 1200 as In Lite and circa 1370 as in Strania. During the Middle Ages, the settlement was known as Stran or Stranje 'side (of a hill), ridge', reflected in the medieval attestations (Middle High German lite 'ridge, (mountain) side', Slovene stran). The current Slovene name is derived from the noble surname Kronberg, which is the German version of the Italian surname Coronini. The Italian surname was interpreted as derived from corona 'crown' and then translated as Middle High German krôn(e), to which the suffix -berc, -berg 'mountain' was added, which is frequent in names of castles and the settlements surrounding them.

== History ==
In the 19th century, a Friulian minority lived in Kromberk, but have almost all been assimilated since. According to the last Austrian census of 1910, 99.8% of the population spoke Slovene as their native language. The historical Friulian presence has left traces in the local dialect of Slovene, as well as in the local toponomy, customs, and cuisine.

== Main sights ==
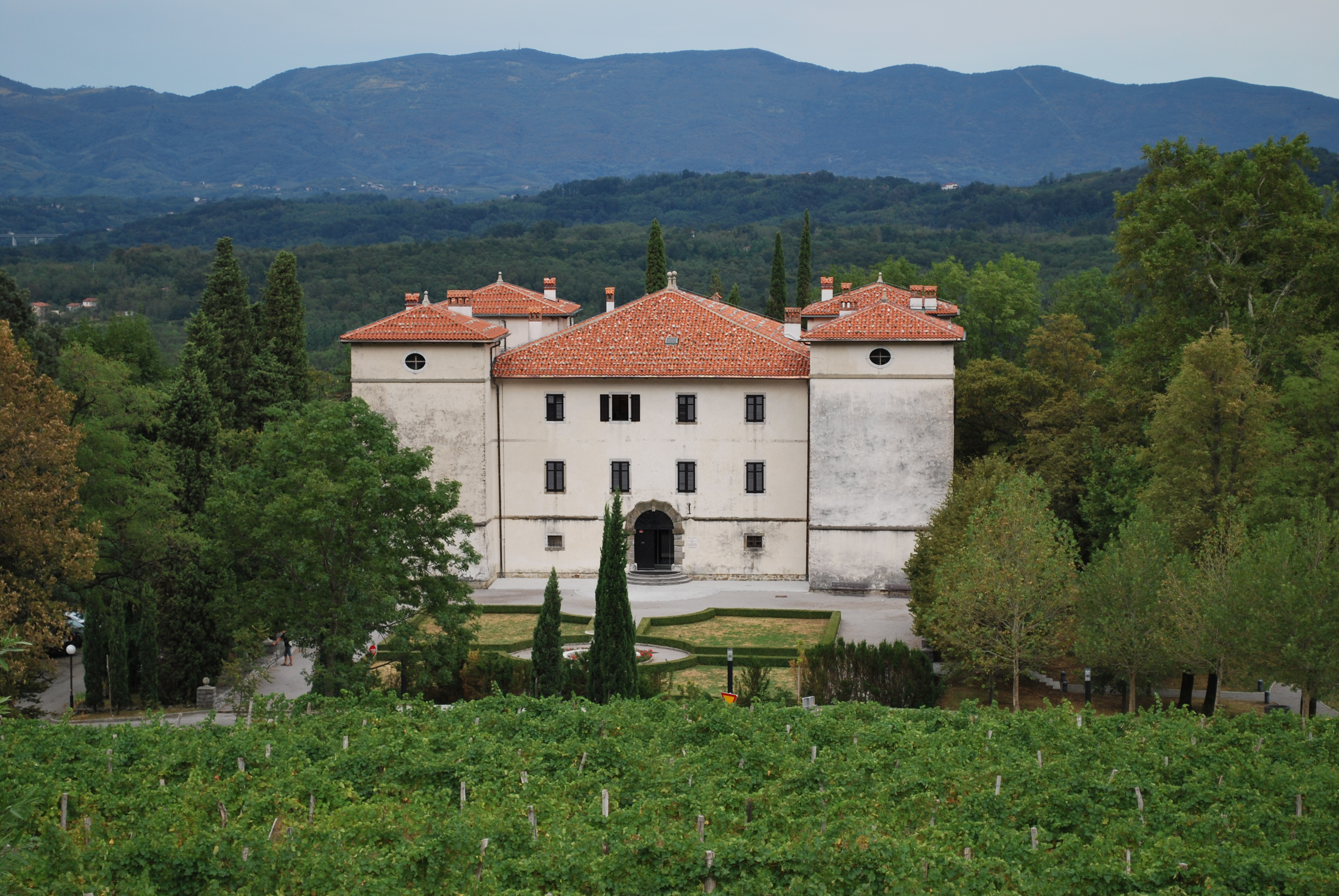
Kromberk Castle

Kromberk Castle is located near the settlement. The Renaissance castle from the 17th century is named after the noble family Coronini Cronberg of Gorizia and Gradisca.

The parish church in the settlement is dedicated to the Virgin Mary Comforter of the Afflicted and belongs to the Diocese of Koper.
