= Stara Gora, Nova Gorica =

Stara Gora
- Location in Slovenia
- Coordinates: 45°55′48.39″N 13°40′41.41″E
- Country: Slovenia
- Traditional region: Slovenian Littoral
- Statistical region: Gorizia
- Municipality: Nova Gorica

Area
  - Total: 2.3 km^{2} (0.89 sq mi)
- Elevation: 174.4 m (572 ft)

Population (2002)
  - Total: 142

Stara Gora (pronounced [ˈstaːɾa ˈɡɔːɾa]; Italian: Montevecchio) is a dispersed settlement southeast of Rožna Dolina in the Municipality of Nova Gorica in western Slovenia. One of the two town cemeteries of Nova Gorica is located in Stara Gora.
