= Julius Evola =

Italian political philosopher and esotericist (1898–1974)

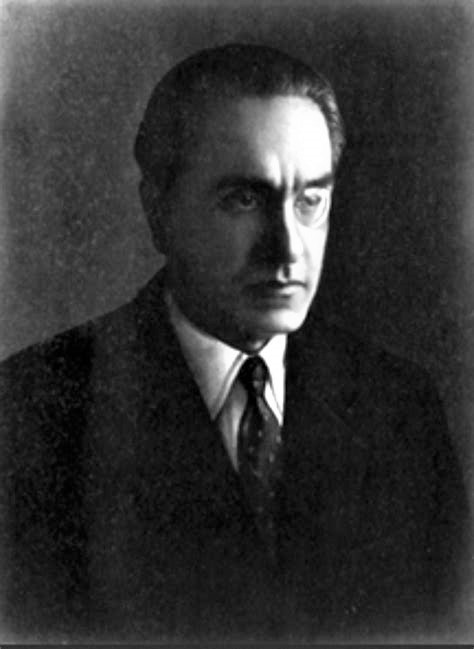
- Evola in the early 1940s
- Born: Giulio Cesare Andrea Evola; 19 May 1898; Rome, Kingdom of Italy
- Died: 11 June 1974 (aged 76); Rome, Italy

Education
- Education: Istituto Tecnico Industriale Leonardo da Vinci
- Academic advisor: Arturo Reghini

Philosophical work
- Era: 20th-century philosophy
- Region: Western philosophy
- School: Perennialism; Traditionalism; Conservative Revolution
- Main interests: Comparative religion; Western esotericism; Hermeticism; Metaphysics; History; Political philosophy; Symbology; Mythology
- Notable ideas: Transcendental realism; magical idealism
- Military service
- Branch: Italian Army
- Service years: 1917–1918
- Rank: Artillery officer
- Conflicts: World War I

Giulio Cesare Andrea Evola (Italian: [ˈɛːvola]; 19 May 1898 – 11 June 1974), better known as Julius Evola, was an Italian philosopher and writer, who espoused traditionalist, aristocratic, martial and imperialist values. An esoteric thinker in Fascist Italy, he also had ties to Nazi Germany. In the post-war era, he was an ideological mentor of Italian militant neo-fascist movements.

Evola was born in Rome and served as an artillery officer in the First World War. He became an artist within the Dada movement but gave up painting in his twenties; he said he considered suicide until he had a revelation while reading a Buddhist text. In the 1920s he delved into the occult; he wrote on Western esotericism and Eastern mysticism, developing his doctrine of "magical idealism". His writings blend various ideas of German idealism, Eastern doctrines, traditionalism and the Conservative Revolution of the interwar period. Evola believed that mankind is living in the Kali Yuga, a Dark Age of unleashed materialistic appetites. To counter this, Evola invoked a rebirth of the "world of Tradition". Tradition for Evola was not Christian—he did not believe in God—but rather an eternal supernatural knowledge with values of authority, hierarchy, order, discipline and obedience.

Evola advocated for the Italian racial laws, and became the leading Italian "racial philosopher". He mentioned having worked for the Sicherheitsdienst (SD), the intelligence agency of the Nazi Schutzstaffel (SS). He fled to Nazi Germany in 1943 when the Italian Fascist regime fell, but returned to Rome under the Italian Social Republic, a Nazi German puppet state, to organise a radical-right group. In 1945 in Vienna, a Soviet shell fragment permanently paralysed him from the waist down. On trial for glorifying fascism in 1951, Evola denied being a fascist, instead declaring himself "superfascista" (superfascist). The historian Elisabetta Cassina Wolff wrote that "It is unclear whether this meant that Evola was placing himself above or beyond Fascism". Evola was acquitted in his first trial, but convicted a few years later in the second.

Evola has been called the "chief ideologue" of the post-war Italian radical right, and his philosophy has been characterised as one of the most "antiegalitarian, antiliberal, antidemocratic, and antipopular systems in the twentieth century". His writings contain misogyny, racism, antisemitism and attacks on Christianity and the Catholic Church. He continues to influence contemporary traditionalist and neo-fascist movements.

== Early life ==
Giulio Cesare Andrea Evola was born in Rome to Sicilian parents on 19 May 1898. His family were members of the Sicilian aristocracy and devout Roman Catholics; he is sometimes described as a baron. Evola considered details about his early life irrelevant, and is noted for hiding some details of his personal life. He adopted the name Julius in homage to Ancient Rome in his mid twenties.

Evola rebelled against his Catholic upbringing. He studied engineering at the Istituto Tecnico Industriale Leonardo da Vinci in Rome, but did not complete his course, later claiming this was because he did not want to be associated with "bourgeois academic recognition" and titles such as "doctor and engineer". In his teenage years, he immersed himself in painting—which he considered one of his natural talents—and literature, including Oscar Wilde and Gabriele d'Annunzio. He was introduced to philosophers such as Friedrich Nietzsche and Otto Weininger. Other early philosophical influences included the Italian man of letters Carlo Michelstaedter and the German post-Hegelian thinker Max Stirner.

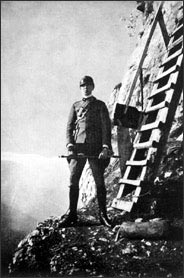
Evola serving as an artillery officer on Monte Cimone di Tonezza, 1917

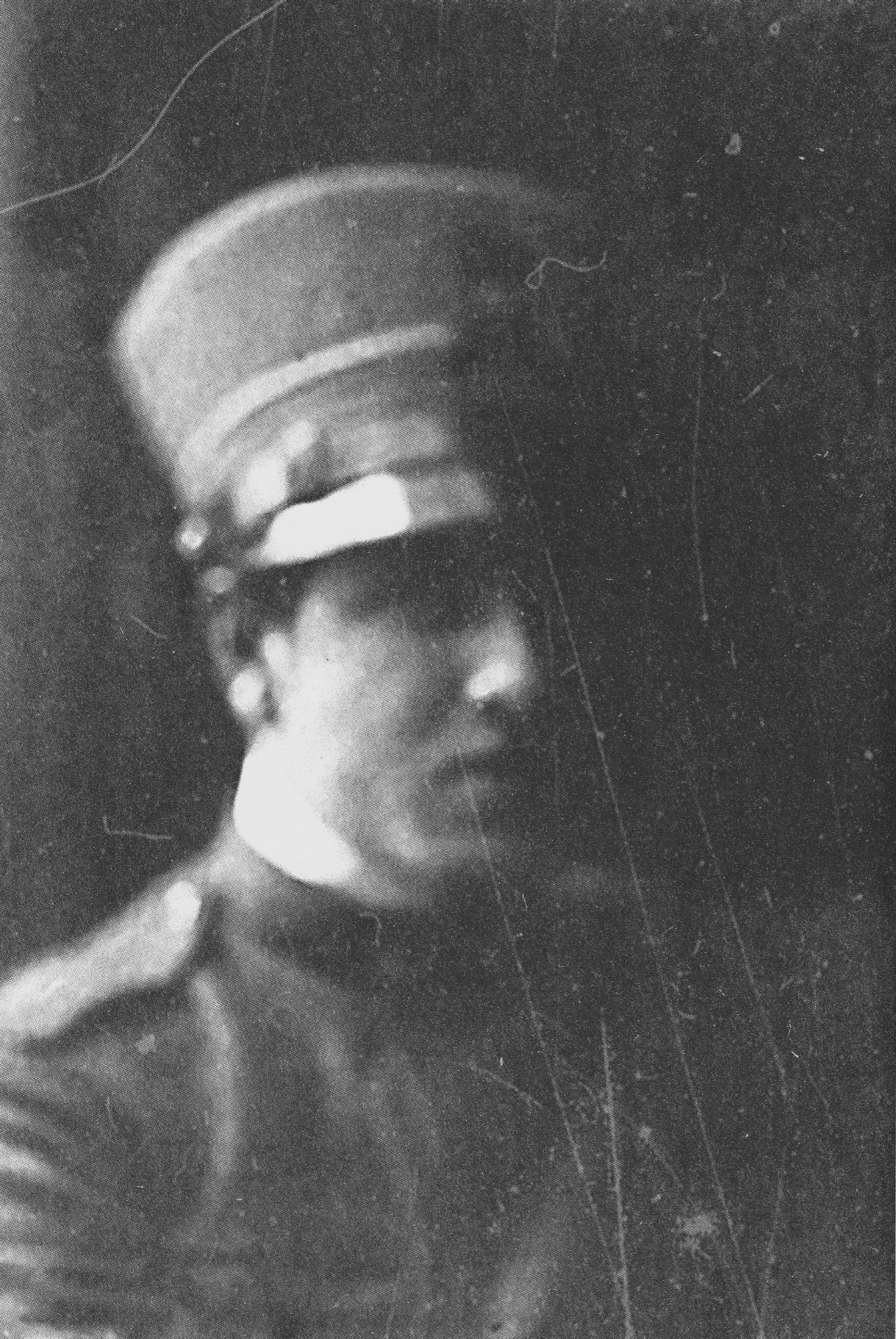
Evola before leaving the army in 1918

He was attracted to the avant-garde, and briefly associated with the Italian poet Filippo Tommaso Marinetti's Futurist movement during his time at university. He broke with Marinetti in 1916 as Evola disagreed with his extreme nationalism and advocacy of industry. In the First World War, Evola served as an artillery officer in the Italian Army on the Asiago plateau. Despite reservations that Italy was fighting against Germany, which Evola admired for its discipline and hierarchy, Evola volunteered in 1917 and briefly saw frontline service the following year. Evola returned to civilian life after the war and became a painter in the Italian Dadaist movement; he described his paintings as "inner landscapes". He wrote his poetry in French and recited it in cabarets accompanied by classical music. Through his painting and poetry, and his work on the short-lived journal Revue Bleue, he became a prominent representative of Dadaism in Italy. In his autobiography, he described his Dadaism as an attack on rationalist cultural values. In 1922, lamenting that avant-garde art was becoming commercialised and stiffened by academic conventions, he gave up painting and renounced poetry. Evola was a keen mountaineer, describing it as a source of revelatory spiritual experience.

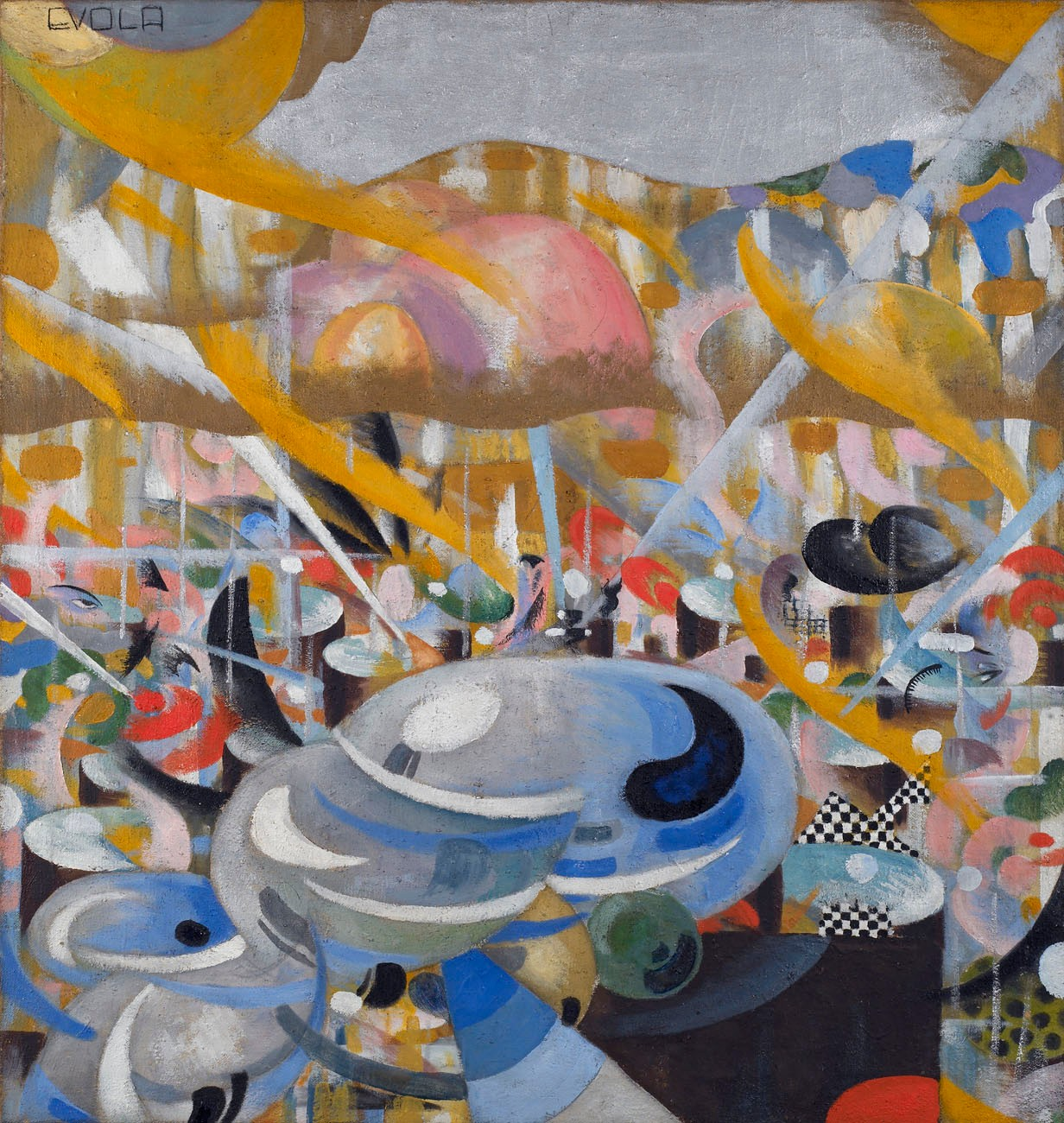
Five o'clock tea, by Evola, 1917

Evola reportedly went through a "spiritual crisis" through the banality of civilian life and his need to "transcend the emptiness" of normal human activity. He experimented with hallucinogenics and magic, which, he wrote, almost brought him to madness. In 1922, at 23 years old, he considered suicide, he wrote in The Cinnabar Path, but was saved by a revelation while reading an early Buddhist text on shedding all specific identity and embracing absolute transcendence.

Evola would later publish The Doctrine of Awakening as a repayment of his debt to Buddhism. His interests gradually led him further into spiritual, transcendental, and "supra-rational" studies: esoteric texts, the occult, alchemy, magic, and Oriental studies, particularly Tibetan Tantric yoga. The historian Richard H. Drake wrote that Evola's alienation from contemporary values resembled that of other young Lost Generation intellectuals after the First World War, but his took an uncompromising, eccentric and reactionary form.

== Philosophy ==
Evola's writings blended ideas from German idealism, Eastern doctrines, traditionalist conservatism, and especially the interwar Conservative Revolution, "with which Evola had a deep personal involvement". He viewed himself as part of an aristocratic caste that had been dominant in an almost-forgotten archaic Golden Age, which had been destroyed by the contemporary Dark Age (Kali Yuga), meaning the whole of historical times. In his writing, Evola addressed others in that caste whom he called l'uomo differenziato (the man who has become different), those who through heredity and initiation were able to transcend the ages.

Evola considered human history to be, in general, decadent; he viewed modernity as the temporary success of the forces of disorder over tradition. Tradition, in Evola's definition, was an eternal supernatural knowledge, with absolute values of authority, hierarchy, order, discipline and obedience. Matthew Rose wrote that "Evola claimed to show how basic human activities—from eating and sex, commerce and games, to war and social intercourse—were elevated by Tradition into something ritualistic, becoming activities whose very repetitiveness offered a glimpse of an unchanging eternal realm". Only the re-establishment of aristocratic authority could ensure the triumph of Tradition over the present chaos. Rose wrote that Evola "aspired to be the most right-wing thinker possible in the modern world".

Evola's philosophical work started in 1924 with Teoria dell'individuo assoluto (Theory of the Absolute Individual) and Fenomenologia dell'individuo assoluto (Phenomenology of the Absolute Individual), originally a single work, which for editorial reasons was divided into separate volumes published in 1927 and 1930 in Turin by Bocca publishers. These attacked the Hegelianism dominant in Italy, especially in the works of Benedetto Croce. Croce may have helped Evola to find a publisher for his Absolute Individual opus.

Evola wrote prodigiously on mysticism, Tantra, Hermeticism, the myth of the Holy Grail and Western esotericism. German Egyptologist and scholar of esotericism Florian Ebeling noted that Evola's The Hermetic Tradition is viewed as an "extremely important work" among esotericists. Evola gave particular focus to Cesare della Riviera's Il Mondo Magico degli Heroi, which he translated into modern Italian. He held that Riviera's text was consonant with the goals of "high magic" – the reshaping of the earthly human into a transcendental 'god man'. According to Evola, the timeless Traditional science attained lucid expression through this text, though lightly veiled to prevent accusations from the church. Though Evola rejected Carl Jung's interpretation of alchemy, Jung described Evola's The Hermetic Tradition as a "magisterial account of Hermetic philosophy". In Hegel and the Hermetic Tradition, the philosopher Glenn Alexander Magee favoured Evola's interpretation over that of Jung's. In 1988 a journal of Hermetic thought published a section of Evola's book, describing it as "Luciferian."

Evola later clarified that he was not a Buddhist, and that his text on Buddhism was meant to balance out his earlier work on the Hindu tantras. Evola's interest in tantra was spurred on by correspondence with John Woodroffe. Evola was attracted to the active aspect of tantra as a practical means to spiritual experience, over the more passive approaches in other forms of Eastern spirituality. In Tantric Buddhism in East Asia, the scholar Richard K. Payne argued that Evola manipulated Tantra in the service of right-wing violence, and that the emphasis on "power" in The Yoga of Power gave insight into his mentality. Evola often relied on European sources about Asian creeds while evoking them for racist ends, Peter Staudenmaier wrote. Rose described Evola as an "unreliable scholar of Eastern religions."

Evola advocated for "differentiated individuals" following the left-hand path to use dark, violent sexual powers to disrupt the modern world. For Evola, these "virile heroes" are both generous and cruel, and their commanding "Dionysian" acts may transgress timid conventional morality.

According to A. James Gregor, Evola's definition of spirituality can be found in Meditations on the Peaks: "what has been successfully actualized and translated into a sense of superiority which is experienced inside by the soul, and a noble demeanor, which is expressed in the body." Evola attempted to construct, Ferraresi wrote, "a model of man striving to reach the 'absolute' within his inner self". For Evola, Furlong wrote, transcendence "rested on the freeing of one's spiritual self through the purity of physical and mental discipline." Evola wrote that the tension between a detached "impulse toward transcendence" and an engaged "warrior spirit" defined his life and work.

Nicholas Goodrick-Clarke wrote that Evola's "rigorous New Age spirituality speaks directly to those who reject absolutely the leveling world of democracy, capitalism, multi-racialism and technology at the outset of the twenty-first century. Their acute sense of cultural chaos can find powerful relief in his ideal of total renewal." Stephen Atkins summarised Evola's philosophy as "a complete rejection of modern society and its mores". Evola loathed liberalism, because, as Rose wrote, "Everything he revered—social castes, natural inequalities, and sacred privileges—was targeted by liberalism for reform or abolition." Goodrick-Clarke wrote that Evola invoked Indo-European tradition to advance "a radical doctrine of anti-egalitarianism, anti-democracy, anti-liberalism and anti-Semitism". Rose described Evola as "one of the strangest intellectual figures of his century".

=== Magical idealism ===
Thomas Sheehan wrote that "Evola's first philosophical works from the 'twenties were dedicated to reshaping neo-idealism from a philosophy of Absolute Spirit and Mind into a philosophy of the "absolute individual" and action." Accordingly, Evola developed his doctrine of "magical idealism", which held that "the Ego must understand that everything that seems to have a reality independent of it is nothing but an illusion, caused by its own deficiency." For Evola, this ever-increasing unity with the "absolute individual" was consistent with unconstrained liberty, and therefore unconditional power. In his 1925 work Essays on Magical Idealism, Evola declared that "God does not exist. The Ego must create him by making itself divine."

According to Sheehan, Evola discovered the power of metaphysical mythology while developing his theories. This led to his advocacy of supra-rational intellectual intuition over discursive knowledge. In Evola's view, discursive knowledge separates man from Being. Sheehan stated that this position is a theme in certain interpretations of Western philosophers such as Plato, Thomas Aquinas, and Martin Heidegger that was exaggerated by Evola. Evola would later write:

The truths that allow us to understand the world of Tradition are not those that can be "learned" or "discussed." They either are or are not. We can only remember them, and that happens when we are freed from the obstacles represented by various human constructions (chief among these are the results and methods of the authorized "researchers") and have awakened the capacity to see from the nonhuman viewpoint, which is the same as the Traditional viewpoint ... Traditional truths have always been held to be essentially non-human.

Evola developed a doctrine of the "two natures": the natural world and the primordial "world of 'Being'". He believed that these "two natures" impose form and quality on lower matter and create a hierarchical "great chain of Being." He understood "spiritual virility" as signifying orientation towards this postulated transcendent principle. He held that the State should reflect this "ordering from above" and the consequent hierarchical differentiation of individuals according to their "organic preformation". By "organic preformation" he meant that which "gathers, preserves, and refines one's talents and qualifications for determinate functions."

=== Ur Group ===
Among Evola's chief contacts was Arturo Reghini, a critic of Christianity and democracy and advocate for the ancient Roman aristocracy. Reghini welcomed the rise of Fascist Italy and sought to return to pre-Christian spirituality through the promotion of a "cultured magic". Through Reghini, Evola was introduced to René Guénon, a French Orientalist and a leading figure of traditionalism at the time who shared an interest in the occult. Guénon's 1927 text Crisis of the Modern World inspired Evola to organise his thoughts around the critique of modernity, and Guénon, whom Evola called his "master", would be one of the few writers Evola found worthy to debate with. In 1927 Reghini and Evola, along with other Italian esotericists, founded the Gruppo di Ur ("Ur Group"). The purpose of this group was to attempt to bring the members' individual identities into such a superhuman state of power and awareness that they would be able to exert a magical influence on the world. The group employed techniques from Buddhist, Tantric, and rare Hermetic texts. They aimed to provide a "soul" to the burgeoning fascist movement of the time through the revival of ancient Roman religion, and to influence the fascist regime through esotericism.

Articles on occultism from the Ur Group were later published in Introduction to Magic. Reghini's support of Freemasonry would however prove contentious for Evola; accordingly, Reghini broke himself from Evola and left the Ur Group in 1928. Reghini accused him of plagiarising his thoughts in the book Pagan Imperialism; Evola, in turn, blamed him for its premature publication. Evola's later work owed a considerable debt to Guénon's Crisis of the Modern World, though he diverged from Guénon by valuing action over contemplation, and the empire over the church.

=== Sexuality and gender ===
Evola held that "just relations between the sexes" involved women acknowledging their "inequality" with men. He quoted Joseph de Maistre's statement that "Woman cannot be superior except as woman, but from the moment in which she desires to emulate man she is nothing but a monkey." Coogan wrote, "It goes almost without saying that Evola's views on women were saturated with misogyny." Evola believed that the alleged higher qualities expected of a man of a particular race were not those expected of a woman of the same race. Evola believed that women's liberation was "the renunciation by woman of her right to be a woman". "A woman", Evola wrote, "could traditionally participate in the sacred hierarchical order only in a mediated fashion through her relationship with a man." He held, as a feature of his idealised gender relations, the archaic Hindu sati (suicide), which for him was a form of sacrifice indicating women's respect for patriarchal traditions. For the "pure, feminine" woman, "man is not perceived by her as a mere husband or lover, but as her lord." Women would find their true identity in total subjugation to men.

Evola regarded matriarchy and goddess religions as a symptom of decadence, and preferred a hypermasculine warrior ethos. He was influenced by Hans Blüher, a proponent of the Männerbund ('alliance of men') concept as a model for his "warrior-band" or "warrior-society". Goodrick-Clarke noted the fundamental influence of Otto Weininger's book Sex and Character on Evola's dualism of male-female spirituality. According to Goodrick-Clarke, "Evola's celebration of virile spirituality was rooted in Weininger's work, which was widely translated by the end of the First World War." Evola denounced homosexuality as "useless" for his purposes. He did not neglect sadomasochism, so long as sadism and masochism "are magnifications of an element potentially present in the deepest essence of eros." Then, it would be possible to "extend, in a transcendental and perhaps ecstatic way, the possibilities of sex."

Evola held that women "played" with men, threatened their masculinity, and lured them into a "constrictive" grasp with their sexuality. He wrote that "It should not be expected of women that they return to what they really are ... when men themselves retain only the semblance of true virility", and lamented that "men instead of being in control of sex are controlled by it and wander about like drunkards". He believed that in Tantra and sex magic, in which he saw a strategy for aggression, he found the means to counter the "emasculated" West. Evola also said that the "ritual violation of virgins", and "whipping women" were a means of "consciousness raising", so long as these practices were done to the intensity required to produce the proper "liminal psychic climate".

Evola translated Weininger's Sex and Character into Italian. Dissatisfied with simply translating Weininger's work, he wrote the text Eros and the Mysteries of Love: The Metaphysics of Sex (1958), where his views on sexuality were dealt with at length. Arthur Versluis described this text as Evola's "most interesting" work aside from Revolt Against the Modern World (1934). This book remains popular among many 'New Age' adherents.

=== Race ===
Evola's views on race had roots in his aristocratic elitism. According to the European studies professor Paul Furlong, Evola developed what he called "the law of the regression of castes" in Revolt Against the Modern World and other writings on racism from the 1930s and the Second World War. In Evola's view "power and civilization have progressed from one to another of the four castes—sacred leaders, warrior nobility, bourgeoisie (economy, 'merchants') and slaves". Furlong explains: "for Evola, the core of racial superiority lay in the spiritual qualities of the higher castes, which expressed themselves in physical as well as in cultural features, but were not determined by them. The law of the regression of castes places racism at the core of Evola's philosophy, since he sees an increasing predominance of lower races as directly expressed through modern mass democracies." Evola used "a man of race" to mean "a man of breeding". "Only of an elite may one say that 'it is of a race': the people are only people, mass," Evola wrote in 1969.

In Synthesis of the Doctrine of Race (1941) (Italian: Sintesi di Dottrina della Razza), Evola provides an overview of his ideas concerning race and eugenics, introducing the concept of "spiritual racism", and "esoteric-traditionalist racism". The book was endorsed by Benito Mussolini.

Prior to the end of the Second World War, Evola frequently used the term "Aryan" to refer to the nobility, who in his view were imbued with traditional spirituality. Feinstein writes that this interpretation made the term "Aryan" more plausible in an Italian context and thereby furthered antisemitism in Fascist Italy. Evola's interpretation was adopted by Mussolini, who declared in 1938 that "Italy's civilization is Aryan". Wolff notes that Evola seems to have stopped writing about race in 1945, but adds that the intellectual themes of Evola's writings were otherwise unchanged. Evola continued to write about elitism and his contempt for the weak. His "doctrine of the Aryan-Roman super-race was simply restated as a doctrine of the 'leaders of men' ... no longer with reference to the SS, but to the mediaeval Teutonic knights or the Knights Templar, already mentioned in [his book] Rivolta."

Evola wrote of "inferior, non-European races". He believed that military aggressions such as Fascist Italy's 1935 invasion of Ethiopia were justified by Italy's dominance, outweighing concerns he had about the possibility of race-mixing. Richard H. Drake wrote, "Evola was never prepared to discount the value of blood altogether". Evola wrote: "a certain balanced consciousness and dignity of race can be considered healthy" in a time when "the exaltation of the negro and all the rest, anticolonialist psychosis and integrationist fanaticism [are] all parallel phenomena in the decline of Europe and the West." Furlong wrote that a 1957 article by Evola about America "leaves no doubt as to his deep prejudice against black people".

==== "Spiritual racism" ====
Evola's racism included racism of the body, soul, and spirit, giving primacy to the latter factor, writing that "races only declined when their spirit failed." For his spiritual interpretation of different racial psychologies, Evola was influenced by the German race theorist Ludwig Ferdinand Clauss. Like Evola, Clauss believed that physical race and spiritual race could diverge as a consequence of miscegenation. Peter Staudenmaier notes that many other racists of the time found Evola's "spiritual racism" perplexing.

Like René Guénon, Evola believed that mankind is living in the Kali Yuga of Hinduism—the Dark Age of unleashed materialistic appetites. He argued that both Italian fascism and Nazism represented hope that the "celestial" Aryan race would be reconstituted. He drew on mythological accounts of super-races and their decline, particularly the Hyperboreans, and maintained that traces of Hyperborean influence could be felt in Aryan men. He felt that Aryan men had devolved from these higher mythological races. Gregor noted that several contemporary criticisms of Evola's theory were published: "In one of Fascism's most important theoretical journals, Evola's critic pointed out that many Nordic-Aryans, not to speak of Mediterranean Aryans, fail to demonstrate any Hyperborean properties. Instead, they make obvious their materialism, their sensuality, their indifference to loyalty and sacrifice, together with their consuming greed. How do they differ from 'inferior' races, and why should anyone wish, in any way, to favor them?"

Concerning the relationship between "spiritual racism" and biological racism, Evola put forth the following viewpoint, which Furlong described as pseudo-scientific: "The factor of 'blood' or 'race' has its importance, because it is not psychologically—in the brain or the opinions of the individual—but in the very deepest forces of life that traditions live and act as typical formative energies. Blood registers the effects of this action, and indeed offers through heredity, a matter that is already refined and pre-formed ..."

=== Antisemitism ===
Writings by Evola in the late 1930s contributed arguments for Fascist Italy's repression of its Jews. Evola encouraged and applauded Mussolini's antisemitic racial laws in 1938, and called for a "supreme Aryan elite" to oppose the Jews. In some writings, Evola called Jews a virus. He said Fascism and Nazism's final victory over Jews would end "the spiritual decadence of the West" and thereby "re-establish genuine contact between man and a transcendent, supersensible reality".

Evola wrote the foreword and an essay in the second Italian edition of the infamous antisemitic fabrication The Protocols of the Elders of Zion published in 1938 by the Catholic fascist Giovanni Preziosi. In it, Evola argued that the Protocols—whether or not a forgery—"contain the plan for an occult war, whose objective is the utter destruction, in the non-Jewish peoples, of all tradition, class, aristocracy, and hierarchy, and of all moral, religious, and spiritual values." He was an admirer of Corneliu Zelea Codreanu, the antisemitic leader of the fascist Romanian Iron Guard. After Codreanu was assassinated in 1938 on orders from King Carol II, Evola railed against "the Judaic horde" that he accused of planning "Talmudic, Israelite tyranny."

Evola's antisemitism did not emphasise the Nazi conception of Jews as "representatives of a biological race", but rather as "the carriers of a world view, a way of being and thinking—simply put, a spirit—that corresponded to the 'worst' and 'most decadent' features of modernity: democracy, egalitarianism and materialism", Wolff writes. According to Wolff, "Evola's 'totalitarian' or 'spiritual' racism was no milder than Nazi biological racism", and Evola was trying to promote an "Italian version of racism and antisemitism, one that could be integrated into the Fascist project to create a New Man". Evola dismissed the biological racism of chief Nazi theorist Alfred Rosenberg and others as reductionist and materialistic. He also argued that one could be "Aryan" but have a "Jewish" soul, and could be "Jewish" but have an "Aryan" soul. In Evola's view, Otto Weininger and Carlo Michelstaedter were Jews of "sufficiently heroic, ascetic, and sacral" character to fit the latter category. In 1970, Evola described Adolf Hitler's antisemitism as a paranoid idée fixe that damaged the reputation of the Third Reich. But Evola never clearly acknowledged the Holocaust committed by the regimes he associated with, perpetrated in the name of racism—Furlong called this a "fatal lapse that by itself ought to be enough to destroy his authority".

== Written works ==
Evola wrote more than 36 books and 1,100 articles. In some of his 1930s writings, and in works about magic, Evola used pseudonyms, including Ea (after a Babylonian god), Carlo d'Altavilla, and Arthos (from Arthurian legend).

=== Christianity ===
In 1928, Evola wrote an attack on Christianity titled Pagan Imperialism, which proposed transforming fascism into a system consistent with ancient Roman values and Western esotericism. Evola proposed that fascism should be a vehicle for reinstating the caste system and aristocracy of antiquity. Although he invoked the term "fascism" in this text, his diatribe against the Catholic Church was criticised by both Benito Mussolini's fascist regime and the Vatican itself. A. James Gregor argued that the text was an attack on fascism as it stood at the time of writing, but noted that Mussolini made use of it to threaten the Vatican with the possibility of an "anti-clerical fascism". Richard Drake wrote that Evola "rarely missed an opportunity to attack the Catholic Church". On account of Evola's anti-Christian proposals, in April 1928 the Vatican-backed right wing Catholic journal Revue Internationale des Sociétés Secrètes published an article entitled "Un Sataniste Italien: Julius Evola", accusing him of satanism.

In his The Mystery of the Grail (1937), Evola discarded Christian interpretations of the Holy Grail and wrote that it "symbolizes the principle of an immortalizing and transcendent force connected to the primordial state ... The mystery of the Grail is a mystery of a warrior initiation." He held that the Ghibellines, who had fought the Guelph for control of Northern and Central Italy in the thirteenth century, had within them the residual influences of pre-Christian Celtic and Nordic traditions that represented his conception of the Grail myth. He also held that the Guelph victory against the Ghibellines represented a regression of the castes, since the merchant caste took over from the warrior caste. In the epilogue to the book, Evola argued that the fictitious The Protocols of the Elders of Zion, regardless of whether it was authentic or not, was a cogent representation of modernity. The historian Richard Barber said, "Evola mixes rhetoric, prejudice, scholarship, and politics into a strange version of the present and future, but in the process he brings together for the first time interest in the esoteric and in conspiracy theory which characterize much of the later Grail literature."

Goodrick-Clarke wrote that Evola "regarded the advent of Christianity as an era of unprecedented decline", because Christianity's egalitarianism and accessibility undermined the Roman ideals of "duty, honor and command" that Evola believed in.

=== Buddhism ===
In his The Doctrine of Awakening (1943), Evola argued that the Pāli Canon could be held to represent true Buddhism. His interpretation of Buddhism is intended to be anti-democratic. He believed that Buddhism revealed the essence of an "Aryan" tradition that had become corrupted and lost in the West. He believed it could be interpreted to reveal the superiority of a warrior caste. Harry Oldmeadow described Evola's work on Buddhism as exhibiting a Nietzschean influence, but Evola criticised Nietzsche's purported anti-ascetic prejudice. Evola claimed that the book "received the official approbation of the Pāli [Text] Society", and was published by a reputable Orientalist publisher. Evola's interpretation of Buddhism, as put forth in his article "Spiritual Virility in Buddhism", is in conflict with the post-World War II scholarship of the Orientalist Giuseppe Tucci, who argues the viewpoint that Buddhism advocates universal benevolence. Arthur Versluis stated that Evola's writing on Buddhism was a vehicle for his own theories, but was a far from accurate rendition of the subject, and he held that much the same could be said of Evola's writings on Hermeticism. Ñāṇavīra Thera was inspired to become a bhikkhu from reading Evola's text The Doctrine of Awakening in 1945 while hospitalised in Sorrento.

=== Islam ===
Evola appears to have appreciated Islam from several perspectives. In Revolt Against the Modern World (1934), he regarded Islam as a comprehensive religious tradition, describing it as a religion of pure monotheism that requires no priesthood to mediate between the believer and Allah. He also emphasized its strength and warrior-like vitality, as well as the effective coexistence of an exoteric dimension, represented by the Sharia, and an esoteric dimension, represented by Sufism. Furthermore, Evola noted that Islam does not subscribe to the doctrine of original sin. On these grounds, he regarded Islam as superior to both Judaism and Christianity. Furthermore, in the same work, Evola employs the concepts of the "greater" and "lesser holy war," using these terms as the title of an entire chapter. These notions derive from Islamic terminology concerning jihad, and Evola values Islam for what he regards as its heroic doctrine, which he considers analogous to that found in the Bhagavad Gita. Evola also published an article on Islam in 1957, entitled The emancipation of Islam is a path towards communism. In this article, he argues that Muslim peoples would never achieve genuine emancipation from the West if they were to accept Western spiritual and cultural influence in the name of progress. In his view, such an orientation would be dangerous, as it could ultimately render Muslim societies vulnerable to the spread of communism.

=== Modernity ===
Evola's Revolt Against the Modern World (1934) promotes the mythology of an ancient Golden Age which gradually declined into modern decadence. In this work, Evola described the features of his idealised traditional society in which religious and temporal power were created and united not by priests, but by warriors expressing spiritual power. In mythology, he saw evidence of the West's superiority over the East. Moreover, he claimed that the traditional elite had the ability to access power and knowledge through a hierarchical magic which differed from the lower "superstitious and fraudulent" forms of magic. He asserted that history's intellectuals starting as early as ancient Greece had undermined traditional values through their questioning. He insisted that only "nonmodern forms, institutions, and knowledge" could produce a "real renewal ... in those who are still capable of receiving it." The text was "immediately recognized by Mircea Eliade and other intellectuals who allegedly advanced ideas associated with Tradition." Eliade was one of the most influential twentieth-century historians of religion, a fascist sympathiser associated with the Romanian Christian right wing movement Iron Guard. Evola was aware of the importance of myth from his readings of Georges Sorel, one of the key intellectual influences on fascism. Hermann Hesse described Revolt Against the Modern World as "really dangerous." Richard Drake wrote that the book was not widely influential in the 1930s but eventually received a cult following on the extreme right and is now considered Evola's most important work.

Ride the Tiger (1961), Evola's last major work, saw him examining dissolution and subversion in a world in which God was dead, and rejected the possibility of any political or collective revival of Tradition due to his belief that the modern world had fallen too far into the Kali Yuga for any such thing to be possible. Instead of this and rather than advocating a return to religion as René Guénon had, he conceptualised what he considered an apolitical manual for surviving and ultimately transcending the Kali Yuga. This idea was summarised in the title of the book, the Tantric metaphor of "Riding the Tiger" which in general practice, consisted of turning things that were considered inhibitory to spiritual progress by mainstream Brahmanical society (for example, meat, alcohol and in very rare circumstances, sex, were all employed by Tantric practitioners) into a means of spiritual transcendence. The process that Evola described involved potentially making use of everything from modern music, hallucinogenic drugs, relationships with the opposite sex and even substituting the atmosphere of an urban existence for the theophany that Traditionalists had identified in virgin nature.

During the 1960s Evola thought right-wing entities could no longer reverse the corruption of modern civilisation. E. C. Wolff noted this is why Evola wrote Ride the Tiger, choosing to distance himself completely from active political engagement, without excluding the possibility of action in the future. He argued that one should stay firm and ready to intervene when the tiger of modernity "is tired of running." Goodrick-Clarke notes that, "Evola sets up the ideal of the 'active nihilist' who is prepared to act with violence against modern decadence."

=== Other writings ===
Evola contributed to Giuseppe Bottai's magazine Critica Fascista for a time. From 1934 to 1943 Evola was responsible for 'Diorama Filosofico', the cultural page of Il Regime Fascista, an influential radical fascist daily newspaper owned by Roberto Farinacci, the pro-Nazi mayor of Cremona. Evola used the page to publish international right-wing thinkers. Evola's writings on the page argued for imperialism; leading up to Mussolini's invasion of Ethiopia, Evola praised "the sacred valor of war". During the same period he contributed to the antisemite Giovanni Preziosi's magazine La vita italiana.

Nicholas Goodrick-Clarke has written that Evola's 1945 essay "American 'Civilization'" described the United States as "the final stage of European decline into the 'interior formlessness' of vacuous individualism, conformity and vulgarity under the universal aegis of money-making." According to Goodrick-Clarke, Evola argued that the U.S. "mechanistic and rational philosophy of progress combined with a mundane horizon of prosperity to transform the world into an enormous suburban shopping mall."

In the posthumously published collection of writings, Metaphysics of War, Evola, in line with the conservative revolutionary Ernst Jünger, explored the viewpoint that war could be a spiritually fulfilling experience. He proposed the necessity of a transcendental orientation in a warrior.

Evola translated some works of Oswald Spengler and Ortega y Gasset to Italian.

== Politics ==
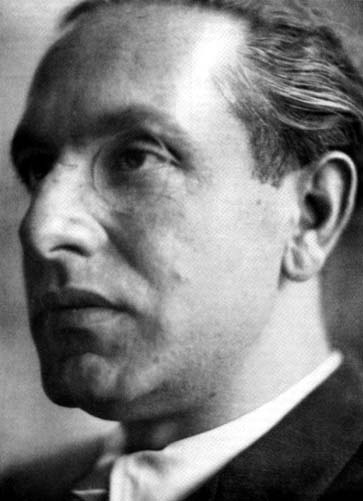
Evola in 1940

In Evola's view, a state ruled by a spiritual elite must reign with unquestionable supremacy over its populace. He cited two models of such an elite as the Schutzstaffel and the Romanian Iron Guard, known for their violence. Evola's philosophy, over his long career, adapted the spiritual orientation of Traditionalist writers such as René Guénon and the political concerns of the European authoritarian right, Furlong wrote. Sheehan described Evola as "perhaps the most original and creative – and, intellectually, the most nonconformist, of the Italian Fascist philosophers".

Evola had access to Benito Mussolini in the last years of the Fascist regime, and advised him on racial policies, but "without much effect", Ferraresi wrote; Evola "was kept (or stayed) on the sidelines of officialty, as some sort of eccentric". Evola was in charge of the cultural page of the influential fascist newspaper Il Regime Fascista for the regime's last decade. Evola declined to join Italy's National Fascist Party or any other party of the time; Ferraresi wrote that Evola's "lofty nonconformism" and "imperial paganism" did not fit well in a party that would make the Catholic Church a regime pillar. Evola's lack of party membership was later emphasised by admirers to distance him from the regime.

Autobiographical remarks by Evola allude to his having worked for the Sicherheitsdienst, the intelligence agency of the SS and the Nazi Party. With its help, he fled to Berlin in Nazi Germany when the Italian Fascist regime fell in 1943. In May 1951 Evola was arrested in Italy and charged with promoting the revival of the Fascist Party, and of glorifying fascism. Evola declared that he was not a Fascist but was instead "superfascista" (lit. 'superfascist'). He was acquitted of all charges.

=== Fascist Italy ===
Evola experienced Mussolini's March on Rome in 1922 and was intrigued by fascism. He would praise fascism for "its attempt to refashion the Italian people into a severe, military mold", in Ferraresi's words, but would criticise any concessions to "democratic" pressures. Atkins wrote that "Evola was critical of the Fascist regime because it was not fascist enough."

Evola applauded Mussolini's anti-bourgeois orientation and his goal of making Italian citizens into hardened warriors, but criticised Fascist populism, party politics, and elements of leftism that he saw in the fascist regime. Evola saw Mussolini's Fascist Party as possessing no cultural or spiritual foundation. He was passionate about infusing it with these elements in order to make it suitable for his ideal conception of Übermensch culture which, in Evola's view, characterised the imperial grandeur of pre-Christian Europe.

Evola applauded the fascist motto "Everything in the State, nothing outside the State, nothing against the State". Sheehan described Evola as "an ardent supporter of Mussolini". But his Traditionalist ethos rejected nationalism, which he viewed as a conception of the modern West and not of a Traditional hierarchical social arrangement. He stated that to become "truly human", one would have to "overcome brotherly contamination" and "purge oneself" of the feeling that one is united with others "because of blood, affections, country or human destiny".

Evola argued that the regime should dictate to the Catholic Church, not negotiate with it, and warned in Critica fascista in 1927 that allowing the church independent power would make fascism a "laughable revolution". In 1928, he wrote that fascists had made "the most absurd of all errors" through entente with Christianity and the church. He also opposed the futurism that Italian society was aligned with, along with the "plebeian" nature of the movement. He opined that Mussolini should have disbanded his party after 1922 and become a loyal advisor to King Victor Emmanuel III instead. Accordingly, Evola launched the journal La Torre (The Tower) in 1930, to advocate for a more elitist social order. He wrote in La Torre, "We would like a fascism more radical, more intrepid, a truly absolute fascism, made of pure force, inaccessible to any compromise." Evola's ideas were poorly received by the contemporary fascist mainstream. Evola wrote that Mussolini's censors had repressed La Torre, which lasted five months and ten issues; in Drake's words, Italian fascism "had as little tolerance for opposition on the right as on the left". Regardless, a few years later in 1934, Evola was put in charge of the cultural page of the influential radical fascist newspaper Il Regime Fascista, a position he held until 1943.

Scholars disagree about why Benito Mussolini embraced racist ideology in 1938—some have written that Mussolini was more motivated by political considerations than ideology when he introduced antisemitic legislation in Italy. Other scholars have rejected the argument that the racial ideology of Italian fascism could be attributed solely to Nazi influence. A more recent interpretation is that Mussolini was frustrated by the slow pace of fascist transformation and, by 1938, had adopted increasingly radical measures including a racial ideology. Aaron Gillette has written that "Racism would become the key driving force behind the creation of the new fascist man, the uomo fascista." With the passage of the Italian racial laws in 1938 and Italy's campaign against Jews, Evola demanded measures to counter "the Jewish menace", through "discrimination and selection". Echoing Evola's writings, Mussolini declared in 1938 that "The population of Italy today is of Aryan origin and Italy's civilization is Aryan."

Mussolini read Evola's Synthesis of the Doctrine of Race in August 1941, and met with Evola to offer him his praise. Evola later recounted that Mussolini had found in his work a uniquely Roman form of Fascist racism distinct from that found in Nazi Germany. With Mussolini's backing, Evola started preparing the launch of a minor journal Sangue e Spirito (Blood and Spirit) which never appeared. While not always in agreement with German racial theorists, Evola travelled to Germany in February 1942 and obtained support for German collaboration on Sangue e Spirito from "key figures in the German racial hierarchy." Fascists appreciated the palingenetic value of Evola's "proof" "that the true representatives of the state and the culture of ancient Rome were people of the Nordic race." Evola eventually became Italy's leading racial philosopher. Mussolini directed the Ministry of Popular Culture to be guided by "Evola's racist thought".

Evola blended Sorelianism with Mussolini's eugenics agenda. Evola has written that "The theory of the Aryo-Roman race and its corresponding myth could integrate the Roman idea proposed, in general, by fascism, as well as give a foundation to Mussolini's plan to use his state as a means to elevate the average Italian and to enucleate in him a new man."

=== Third Reich ===
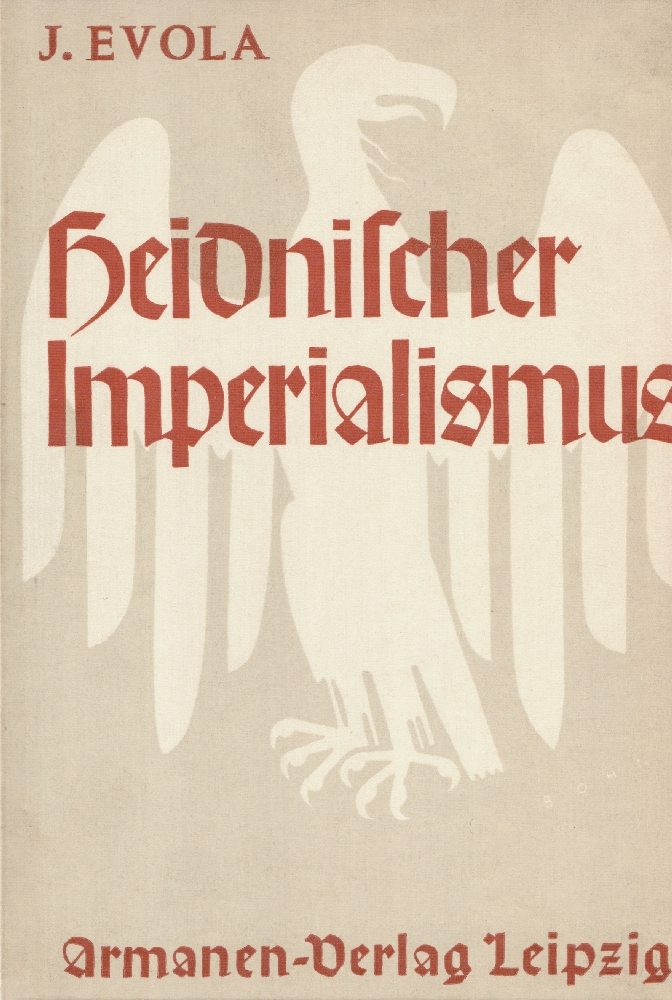
Title page of Heidnischer Imperialismus (1933), the German translation of Evola's book Imperialismo pagano (1928)

Finding Italian fascism "too compromising" (in Goodrick-Clarke's words), Evola sought more recognition in Nazi Germany. He began lecturing there in 1934. He described Berlin's Herrenklub, associated with the Conservative Revolution aristocracy, as his "natural habitat". His considerable amount of time in Germany in 1937 and 1938 included a series of lectures to the German–Italian Society in 1938. Evola appreciated what he called Nazism's "attempt to create a kind of new political-military Order with precise qualifictions of race", and believed that the Nazis' brand of fascism had taken its traditionalist thinkers seriously. Evola thought far more highly of Adolf Hitler than Mussolini, although he had reservations about Hitler's völkisch nationalism. Evola wanted a spiritual unity between Italy and Germany and an Axis victory in Europe. (Martin A. Lee calls Evola an "Italian Nazi philosopher" in The Beast Reawakens.)

Evola admired Heinrich Himmler, whom he knew personally. Evola took issue with Nazi populism and biological materialism. SS authorities initially rejected Evola's ideas as supranational and aristocratic, though he was better received by members of the conservative revolutionary movement. The Nazi Ahnenerbe reported that many considered his ideas to be pure "fantasy" which ignored "historical facts". Himmler's Schutzstaffel (SS) kept a dossier on Evola—dossier document AR-126 described his plans for a "Roman-Germanic Imperium" as "utopian" and described him as a "reactionary Roman," whose goal was an "insurrection of the old aristocracy against the modern world." The document recommended that the SS "stop his effectiveness in Germany" and provide him with no support, particularly because of his desire to create a "secret international order".

Despite this opposition, Evola was able to establish political connections with pan-Europeanist elements inside the Reich Security Main Office. He subsequently ascended to the inner circles of Nazism as the influence of pan-European advocates overtook that of Völkisch proponents, due to military contingencies. Evola wrote the article Reich and Imperium as Elements in the New European Order for the Nazi-backed journal European Review. He spent World War II working for the Sicherheitsdienst. The Sicherheitsdienst bureau Amt VII, a Reich Security Main Office research library, supplied Evola with arcane occult and Masonic texts.

Mussolini was deposed and imprisoned in 1943, and Italy surrendered to the Allies. At this point, Evola fled to Berlin in Nazi Germany with the help of the Sicherheitsdienst. Evola was one of the first people to greet Mussolini when Mussolini was broken out of prison by Otto Skorzeny in September 1943. According to Sheehan, Adolf Hitler also met Evola and other fascist intellectuals. After the meeting with Mussolini, at Hitler's Wolf's Lair, Evola involved himself in Mussolini's Italian Social Republic (the Republic of Salò, a Nazi puppet regime). Evola returned to Rome in 1943 to organise a radical-right group called the Movimento per la Rinascita dell'Italia. He fled to Vienna in 1944, barely avoiding capture by the Americans when the Allies took Rome.

In Vienna, Evola studied Masonic and Jewish documents confiscated by the Nazis, and worked with the SS and fascist leaders on recruiting an army to resist the Allies' advances. It was Evola's custom to walk around the city during bombing raids in order to better "ponder his destiny". During one such aerial bombardment in 1945, a shell fragment damaged his spinal cord. He was left paralysed below the waist for the rest of his life.

About the alliance during World War II between Allies and the Soviet Union, Evola wrote: "The democratic powers repeated the error of those who think they can use the forces of subversion for their own ends without cost. They do not know that, by a fatal logic, when exponents of two different grades of subversion meet or cross paths, the one representing the more developed grade will take over in the end."

=== Postwar and later years ===
Evola, partially paralysed after the Soviet bombing raid in Vienna in 1945, returned to postwar Italy in 1948, after being treated for his injuries in Austria.

Ferraresi wrote that Evola was "the guru" for generations of radical right Italian militants, through his writings and youth groups. "The political model Evola selected after 1945 was neither Mussolini nor Hitler," Wolff writes; instead, in post-World War II conversations with neo-fascists, Evola would reference the Nazi SS, the Spanish Falange, Codreanu's Legionary Movement, Knut Hamsun, Vidkun Quisling, Léon Degrelle, Drieu La Rochelle, Robert Brasillach, Maurice Bardèche, Charles Maurras, Plato (particularly The Republic), Dante (particularly De Monarchia), Joseph de Maistre, Donoso Cortés, Otto von Bismarck, Klemens von Metternich, Gaetano Mosca, Vilfredo Pareto, and Robert Michels. He wrote for publications of the neo-fascist Italian Social Movement (MSI) but never joined the party. Adkins wrote that the MSI "claimed him as their philosopher-king, but he barely tolerated their attention". Wolff described him as a "freelance political commentator".

Evola continued his work in the domain of esotericism, writing a number of books and articles on sex magic and various other esoteric studies, including The Yoga of Power: Tantra, Shakti, and the Secret Way (1949), Eros and the Mysteries of Love: The Metaphysics of Sex (1958), and Meditations on the Peaks: Mountain Climbing as Metaphor for the Spiritual Quest (1974). He also wrote his two explicitly political books Men Among the Ruins: Post-War Reflections of a Radical Traditionalist (1953), Ride the Tiger: A Survival Manual for the Aristocrats of the Soul (1961), and his autobiography, The Path of Cinnabar (1963). He also expanded upon critiques of American civilisation and materialism, as well as increasing American influence in Europe, collected in the posthumous anthology Civiltà Americana.

Evola was arrested along with thirty-six others in April 1951 by the Political Office of the Rome Police Headquarters and charged on suspicion that he was an ideologue of the militant neofascist organisation Fasci di Azione Rivoluzionaria (FAR), after attempted bombings in 1949–50 were linked to Evola's circle. Evola's charges were glorifying fascism and promoting the revival of the Fascist Party. His lawyer was Francesco Carnelutti. He was carried into the courtroom on a stretcher. Defending himself at trial, Evola said that his work belonged to a long tradition of anti-democratic writers who could be linked to fascism—at least fascism interpreted according to certain Evolian criteria—but who could not be identified with the Fascist regime under Mussolini. Evola then denied being a fascist and instead referred to himself as "superfascista" (lit. 'superfascist'). Concerning this statement, the historian Elisabetta Cassina Wolff wrote that it is unclear whether this meant he was placing himself "above or beyond Fascism". The judges, who themselves had served during the fascist era, ruled that Evola could not be held responsible for the crimes. Evola was acquitted of all charges on 20 November 1951. Of the 36 other defendants, 13 received prison sentences.

While trying to distance himself from Nazism, Evola wrote in 1955 that the Nuremberg trials were a farce. Evola also made an effort to differentiate his caste based aristocratic state from totalitarianism, preferring the concept of the "organic" state, which he put forth in his text Men Among the Ruins, as well as in his autodifesa. Evola sought to develop a strategy for the implementation of a "conservative revolution" in post-World War II Europe. He rejected nationalism, advocating instead for a European Imperium, which could take various forms according to local conditions, but should be "organic, hierarchical, anti-democratic, and anti-individual". Evola endorsed Francis Parker Yockey's neo-fascist manifesto Imperium, but said Yockey had a "superficial" understanding of what was immediately possible. Evola believed that his conception of neo-fascist Europe could best be implemented by an elite of "superior" men who operated outside normal politics. He dreamt that such a "New Order" of aristocracy might seize power from above during a democratic crisis.

Evola's occult ontology exerted influence over post-war neo-fascism. After 1945, Evola was considered the most important Italian theoretician of the conservative revolutionary movement and the "chief ideologue" of Italy's post-war radical right. Ferraresi wrote that "Evola's thought was the 'essential mortar' that held together generations of militants". According to Jacob Christiansen Senholt, Evola's most significant post-war political texts are Orientamenti and Men Among the Ruins. In the opening phrase in the first edition of Men Among the Ruins, Evola said: "Our adversaries would undoubtedly want us, in a Christian spirit, under the banner of progress or reform, having been struck on one cheek to turn the other. Our principle is different: "Do to others what they would like to do to you: but do it to them first."

In Men Among the Ruins, Evola defines the Fourth Estate as being the last stage in the cyclical development of the social elite, the first beginning with a spiritual elite of divine right. Expanding the concept in an essay in 1950, the Fourth State according to Evola would be characterised by "the collectivist civilization... the communist society of the faceless-massman".

Orientamenti was a text against "national fascism"—instead, it advocated for a European Community modelled on the principles of the Waffen-SS, which had mustered international forces. The Italian neo-fascist group Ordine Nuovo adopted Orientamenti as a guide for action in postwar Italy. Evola praised Ordine Nouvo as the only Italian group that had "doctrinally had held firm without descending to compromise". The European Liberation Front of Francis Parker Yockey called Evola "Italy's greatest living authoritarian philosopher" in the April 1951 issue of its publication Frontfighter. Giuliano Salierni, who was an activist in the neo-Fascist Italian Social Movement during the early 1950s, later recalled Evola's calls to violence, along with Evola's reminiscences about Nazis such as Joseph Goebbels.

== Personal life ==
Evola was childless and never married, but as a young man he had a relationship with the writer Sibilla Aleramo. He spent his postwar years in his apartment in Rome. He died on 11 June 1974 in Rome of congestive heart failure. His ashes, per his will, were deposited in a hole cut in a glacier on Monte Rosa in the Pennine Alps.

== Legacy ==
At one time Italian Fascist leader Benito Mussolini, the Nazi Grail-seeker Otto Rahn, and the Romanian fascist sympathiser and religious historian Mircea Eliade admired Evola. After World War II, Evola's writings continued to influence many European far-right political, racist and neo-fascist movements. He is widely translated in French, Spanish, partly in German, and mostly in Hungarian (the largest number of his translated works). Franco Ferraresi described Evola in 1987 as "possibly the most important intellectual figure for the Radical Right in contemporary Europe" but "virtually unknown outside the Right". He is described by Stanley Payne (in 1996) and Stephen Atkins (2004) as the leading neo-fascist intellectual in Europe until his death in 1974. Giorgio Almirante referred to him as "our Marcuse—only better." But outside Italy, France and Germany, Evola was not well known until around 1990 when he received wider English-language publication, according to Furlong.

Richard Drake wrote that Evola advocated terrorism. Peter Merkl noted that Evola's advocacy of force was part of his appeal to the radical right. Wolff wrote: "The debate around his 'moral and political' responsibility for terrorist actions perpetrated by right-wing extremist groups in Italy between 1969 and 1980 began as soon as Evola died in 1974 and have not yet come to an end."

According to one leader of the neo-fascist organization Ordine Nuovo, "Our work since 1953 has been to transpose Evola's teachings into direct political action." The neo-fascist terrorists Franco Freda and Mario Tuti reprinted Evola's most militant texts. Radicals of the Nuclei Armati Rivoluzionari (NAR) helped spread Evola's philosophy in far-right circles abroad after fleeing Italy in the wake of the terrorist bombing of the Bologna railway station in 1980; some influenced Britain's National Front. Roberto Fiore and his colleagues in the early 1980s helped the National Front's "Political Soldiers" forge a militant elitist philosophy based on Evola's "most militant tract", The Aryan Doctrine of Battle and Victory. The Aryan Doctrine called for a "Great Holy War" that would be fought for spiritual renewal and fought in parallel to the physical "Little Holy War" against perceived enemies.

Umberto Eco mocked Evola; his 1995 essay "Ur-Fascism" referred to Evola as the "most influential theoretical source of the theories of the new Italian right", and as "one of the most respected fascist gurus".

The English political activist and orator Jonathan Bowden gave lectures on Evola's philosophy. Political philosopher Alain de Benoist of the Nouvelle Droite has cited Evola as an influence.

Goodrick-Clarke noted Evola's pessimistic invocation of the Kali Yuga as an influence on esoteric Nazism and Aryan cults.

Evola's Heidnischer Imperialismus (1933) was translated by the Russian Eurasianist Aleksandr Dugin in 1981. Dugin has said that in his youth he was "deeply inspired" by Guénon's and Evola's Traditionalism.

The Greek neo-Nazi party Golden Dawn includes his works on its suggested reading list, and the leader of the Hungarian nationalist party Jobbik admires Evola and wrote an introduction to his works.

References to Evola are widespread in the 21st-century alt-right movement. Media executive and political strategist Steve Bannon has called him an influence. A former worker of Praxis, a company backed by Sam Altman and Peter Thiel, was reported to have said that recruitment of new members and prospective residents for enclaves of the proposed "Network Empire" should be guided by Evola's "four castes."

== Works ==
Books

- L'individuo e il divenire del mondo (1926; The Individual and the Becoming of the World).
- L'uomo come potenza (1925; Man as Potency).
- Teoria dell'individuo assoluto (1927; The Theory of the Absolute Individual).
- Imperialismo pagano (1928; second edition 1978) – English translation: Pagan Imperialism. Arktos. 2024. ISBN 978-1-915755-77-3.
- Fenomenologia dell'individuo assoluto (1930; The Phenomenology of the Absolute Individual).
- La tradizione ermetica (1931; third edition 1971) – English translation: The Hermetic Tradition: Symbols and Teachings of the Royal Art. Inner Traditions. 1995. ISBN 978-0-89281-451-0.
- Maschera e volto dello spiritualismo contemporaneo: Analisi critica delle principali correnti moderne verso il sovrasensibile (1932) – English translation: The Mask and Face of Contemporary Spiritualism. Arktos. 2018. ISBN 978-1-912079-34-6. And: The Fall of Spirituality: The Corruption of Tradition in the Modern World. Inner Traditions/Bear. 2021. ISBN 978-1-62055-978-9.
- Heidnischer Imperialismus (1933) – English translations: Heathen Imperialism. Cariou Publishing. 2007. ISBN 9782493842008. And: Pagan Imperialism. Gornahoor Press. 2017. ISBN 978-0-9990860-0-1.
- Rivolta contro il mondo moderno (1934; second edition 1951; third edition 1970) – English translation: Revolt Against the Modern World: Politics, Religion, and Social Order in the Kali Yuga. Inner Traditions/Bear. 1995. ISBN 978-0-89281-506-7.
- Il Mistero del Graal e la Tradizione Ghibellina dell'Impero (1937) – English translation: The Mystery of the Grail: Initiation and Magic in the Quest for the Spirit. Inner Traditions/Bear. 1996. ISBN 978-0-89281-573-9.
- Il mito del sangue. Genesi del Razzismo (1937; second edition 1942) – English translation: The Myth of the Blood: The Genesis of Racialism. Arktos. 2018. ISBN 978-1-912079-42-1.
- Sintesi di dottrina della razza (1941) – English translation: Synthesis of the Doctrine of Race. Cariou Publishing. 2020. ISBN 9782954741642.
- Indirizzi per una educazione razziale (1941) – English translations: The Elements of Racial Education. Cariou Publishing. 2022. ISBN 9782954741635.
- La dottrina del risveglio (1943) – English translation: The Doctrine of Awakening: The Attainment of Self-Mastery According to the Earliest Buddhist Texts. Inner Traditions/Bear. 1996. ISBN 978-0-89281-553-1.
- Lo Yoga della potenza (1949; second edition 1968) – English translation: The Yoga of Power: Tantra, Shakti, and the Secret Way. Inner Traditions/Bear. 1993. ISBN 978-0-89281-368-1.
- Gli uomini e le rovine (1953; second edition 1972) – English translation: Men Among the Ruins: Post-War Reflections of a Radical Traditionalist. Inner Traditions/Bear. 2002. ISBN 978-0-89281-905-8.
- Metafisica del sesso (1958; second edition 1969) – English translations: 1983–1991: Eros and the Mysteries of Love: The Metaphysics of Sex. Inner Traditions/Bear. 1991. ISBN 978-0-89281-315-5.
- L'operaio nel pensiero di Ernst Jünger (1960; The Worker in the Thought of Ernst Jünger). Excerpts in English
- Cavalcare la tigre (1961) – English translation: Ride the Tiger: A Survival Manual for the Aristocrats of the Soul. Inner Traditions/Bear. 2003. ISBN 978-0-89281-125-0.
- Il cammino del cinabro (1963; second edition 1972) – English translation: The Path of Cinnabar. Arktos. 2009. ISBN 978-1-907166-02-0.
- Il Fascismo. Saggio di una analisi critica dal punto di vista della Destra (1964; second edition 1970) – English translation: Fascism Viewed from the Right. Arktos. 2013. ISBN 978-1-907166-85-3. And: Notes on the Third Reich. Arktos. 2013. ISBN 978-1-907166-86-0.

Collections

- Saggi sull'idealismo magico (1925; Essays on Magical Idealism).
- Introduzione alla magia (1927–1929; 1971) – English translation: Introduction to Magic: Rituals and Practical Techniques for the Magus. Inner Traditions/Bear. 2001. ISBN 978-0-89281-624-8. And: Introduction to Magic, Volume II: The Path of Initiatic Wisdom. Inner Traditions/Bear. 2019. ISBN 978-1-62055-718-1. And: Introduction to Magic, Volume III: Realizations of the Absolute Individual. Inner Traditions/Bear. 2021. ISBN 978-1-62055-719-8.
- L'arco e la clava (1968) – English translation: The Bow and the Club. Arktos. 2018. ISBN 978-1-912079-08-7.
- Ricognizioni. Uomini e problemi (1974) – English translation: Recognitions: Studies on Men and Problems from the Perspective of the Right. Arktos. 2017. ISBN 978-1-912079-17-9.
- Meditazioni delle vette (1974) – English translation: Meditations on the Peaks: Mountain Climbing as Metaphor for the Spiritual Quest. Inner Traditions/Bear. 1998. ISBN 978-1-62055-038-0.
- Metafisica della Guerra (1996) – English translation: Metaphysics of War: Battle, Victory and Death in the World of Tradition. Arktos. 2011. ISBN 978-1-907166-36-5.
- Jobboldali fiatalok kézikönyve (2012, collection of Hungarian translations of periodicals by Evola, published by Kvintesszencia Kiadó) – English translation: A Handbook for Right-Wing Youth. Arktos. 2017. ISBN 978-1-62055-978-9.
- A Traditionalist Confronts Fascism. Arktos. 2015. ISBN 978-1-910524-02-2.
- East & West: Comparative Studies in Pursuit of Tradition. Counter-Currents. 2018. ISBN 978-1-935965-66-4.
- Metaphysics of Power. Arktos. 2021. ISBN 978-1-914208-09-6.

Articles and pamphlets

- L'Homme et son devenir selon le Vedânta. (1925; Review of Guenon's work published in 1925 in L'Idealismo Realistico).
- Il superamento dello spiritismo (1928) Il Lavoro d'Italia,11 April.
- Tre aspetti del problema ebraico (1936) – Originally published by Edizioni Mediterranee in 1936, this was also published in Italian by Edizioni di Ar, in 1978. English translation: Three Aspects of the Jewish Problem. Cariou Publishing. 2014. ISBN 9782493842022.
- La tragedia della 'Guardia di Ferro - (1938) English translation: The Tragedy of the Iron Guard. Originally published in La vita italiana 309, Dec 1938.
- On the Secret of Decay (1938) – Originally written in German and published by the Deutsches Volkstum magazine n. 14.
- Le Napolas (1941) – English translation: "The Naples" published in the italian fascist periodical "Il Regime Fascista".
- Una vittima d'Israele (1939). Published in January 1939 in La vita Italiana.
- Orientamenti, undici punti (1950) – English translation: "Orientations: Eleven Points", in A Traditionalist Confronts Fascism. Arktos. 2015. ISBN 978-1-910524-02-2.
- L'emancipazione dell'islam è una strada verso il comunismo (1957) – English translation: The emancipation of Islam is a path towards communism. Published on Meridiano d'Italia newspaper. It appears this article was reprinted in the journal Roma in 1958.
- Il vampirismo ed i vampiri (1973) – English: Vampirism and Vampires. Written for journal Roma in September 1973.

Works edited and/or translated by Evola

- Tao Tê Ching: Il libro della via e della virtù (1923; The Book of the Way and Virtue). Second edition: Il libro del principio e della sua azione (1959; The Book of the Primary Principle and of Its Action).
- La guerra occulta: armi e fasi dell'attacco ebraico-massonico alla tradizione europea by Emmanuel Malynski and Léon de Poncins (1939) – English translation: The Occult War: The Judeo-Masonic Plot to Conquer the World. Logik Förlag. 2015. ISBN 9789187339356.

== See also ==
- Mysticism
- Traditionalist School
- Western esotericism
- Western philosophy
