= Revolt Against the Modern World =

1934 book by Julius Evola

- First edition English hardcover, published by Inner Traditions in 1995
- Author: Julius Evola
- Original title: Rivolta contro il mondo moderno
- Language: Italian
- Subject: Traditionalism, Western esotericism
- Genre: Philosophy
- Publisher: Inner Traditions
- Publication date: 1934
- Publication place: Italy
- English publication date: 1995
- Media type: Print
- Pages: 375 (Inner Traditions)
- ISBN: 0-89281506-X
- OCLC: 5930915

Revolt Against the Modern World (Italian: Rivolta contro il mondo moderno) is a book by Julius Evola, first published in Italy in 1934. Described as Evola's most influential work, it is an elucidation of his Traditionalist world view. The first part of the book deals with the concepts of the Traditional world; its knowledge of the bridge between the earthly and the transcendent worlds. The second part deals with the modern world, contrasting its characteristics with those of traditional societies: from politics and institutions to views on life and death. Evola denounces the regressive aspects of modern civilisation, and instead argues for a traditionalist society.

== Publication history ==
Rivolta contro il mondo moderno was published in Milan by Hoepli in 1934. A revised and augmented edition was published in 1969. Translated into English by Guido Stucco (from the 1969 edition), it was published by Inner Traditions. It has also been translated into German, Spanish, French, Serbian, Hungarian and Romanian. The book influenced Mircea Eliade and other thinkers in the Traditionalist school, as well as the European Nouvelle Droite.

== Contents ==
Revolt Against the Modern World is divided into two parts: "The World of Tradition" and "Genesis and the Face of the Modern World".

The first part, "The World of Tradition", is a comparative study of the doctrines of traditional civilizations where Evola indicates that the fundamental principles of the life of traditional man are manifested in the doctrine of two natures, the existence of a physical order and a metaphysical one. It follows the indication of the way in which the man of the tradition conceives law, war, property, relations between the sexes, immortality, and race. The second part instead contains an interpretation of history on a traditional basis: it starts from the origins of man to arrive at the modern concept of evolution in the Darwinian sense which, according to tradition, is considered a regress, an involution.

Evola begins the second chapter of Revolt Against the Modern World stating that the traditional world is never perfectly realized in history. According to Evola, the key to tradition and what he supposes was the defining feature of the traditional world, was the experiential knowledge of the two natures: high and low, being and becoming, supernatural and natural. Then, Evola leads to promote the beneficial qualities of historical societies that embodied tradition: "The traditional world knew divine kingship. It knew the bridge between the two worlds, namely, initiation; it knew the two great ways of approaching the transcendent, namely, heroic action and contemplation. It knew the moral foundation, namely, the traditional law and the caste system; and it knew the political earthly symbol, namely, the empire."

From this, Evola concludes that the traditional world had no defining ethics so therefore, it had no theory of any kind. Without theory, there was no learning of such theory and without learning, no progress. Evola explains how any progress or change from these traditional societies is involution rather than evolution, the study of history is only the study of decay. Evola appreciates how due to this, in traditional societies there was only adherence to the primordialism, a single ethnic identity, which he believes has been lost due to modernity.

Once Evola characterizes traditional societies, he proceeds to dive into his metaphysical views of gender roles. As Evola divides the universe between above and below, he relates this to the supernatural and the natural. According to Evola, women are natural and men are supernatural. The male is self-subsistent while the female is dependent. Evola grounds these views on gender roles by relating them to Hinduism and Taoism in particular.
