= Miljenko Jergović =

Bosnian and Croatian writer

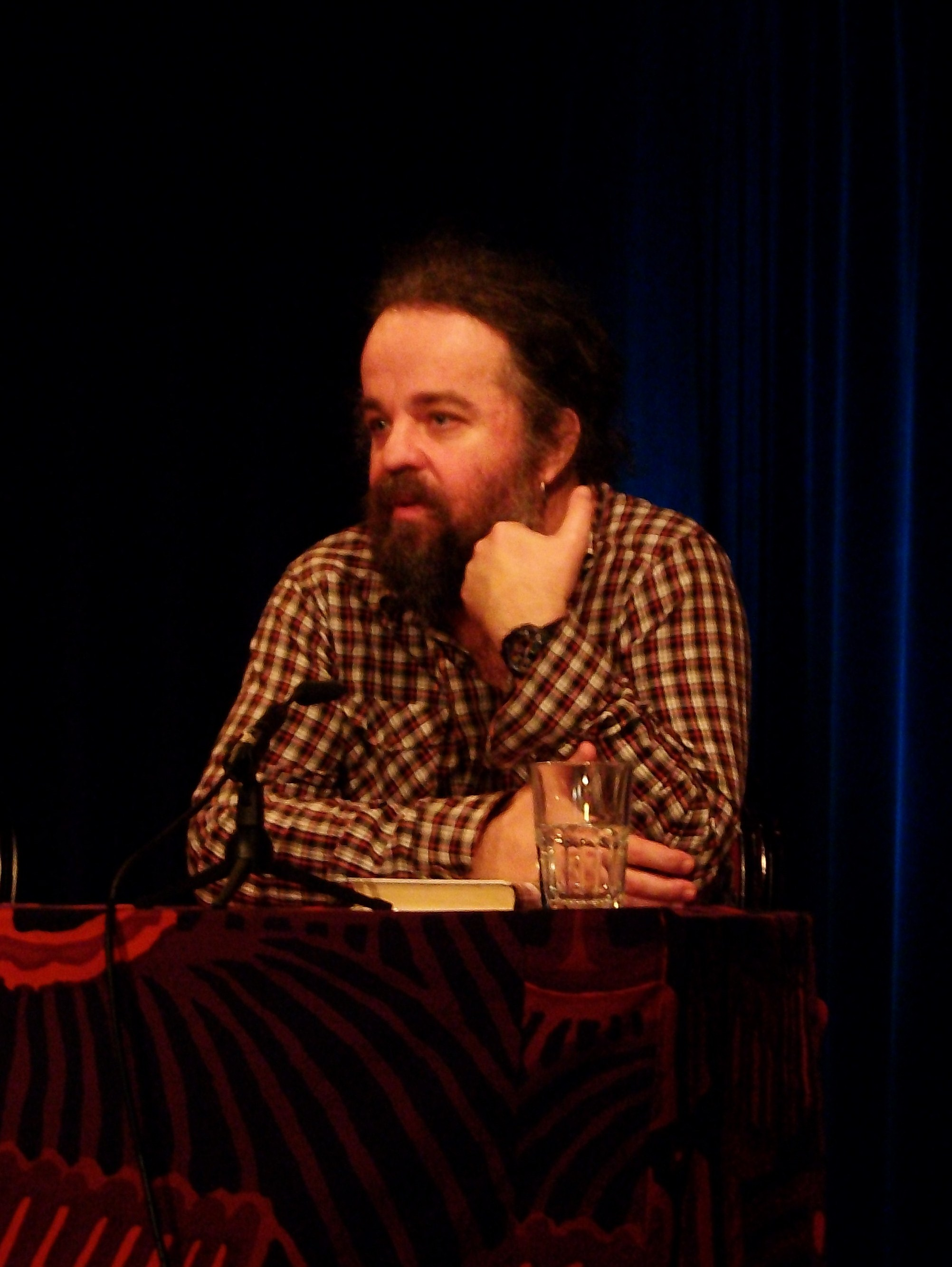
- Jergović in Graz, Austria, November 2012
- Born: 28 May 1966 (age 60); Sarajevo, SFR Yugoslavia
- Education: University of Sarajevo
- Occupations: Short story writer, novelist and columnist
- Writing career
- Period: 1988–present
- Genres: short story, novel, poetry, essay, social commentary
- Subject: life in post-Yugoslav society
- Notable works: Sarajevski Marlboro, Dvori od Oraha, Ruta Tannenbaum
- Literary movement: Postmodernism

Miljenko Jergović (born 28 May 1966) is a Bosnian writer.

== Biography ==
Born in Sarajevo, SR Bosnia and Herzegovina, SFR Yugoslavia to Croatian parents, Jergović received his M.A. in literature from the Sarajevo University. While at high-school, he started working as a journalist in printed and electronic media, as a contributor to literary and youth magazines, and was soon recognized as Croatia's media correspondent from Sarajevo.

== Writing ==
Jergović's novels treat his family members and their histories. He is also a journalist and has published a collection of his articles in Historijska čitanka (A Reader in History, 1996).

Jergović writes a column in the Serbian daily Politika, for Vreme magazine and a regular column in the Croatian daily Jutarnji list entitled Sumnjivo lice (trans. "suspicious character", lit. "suspicious face").

== Works ==
His novel Buick Riviera was made into a movie in 2008 by filmmaker Goran Rušinović, and the two were in turn awarded the Golden Arena for Best Screenplay. According to the author himself, it is a "novella" set in North American countryside, dealing with the conflict of a Serbian refugee from Bosnia, probably a war criminal, and a Muslim refugee who had spent twenty years in the United States. Its heroes, who always carry with them their native lore, their religion and their mentality, though they have numerous reasons for feelings of love and understanding of others, become victims of their own inability to rise above their national background, above their old hatreds and the burden of historical conflicts.

Miljenko Jergovic wrote another novel or "documented diary" – "Volga, Volga", a book about a car and his driver. This is a complicated story about guilt and death, the Yugoslav war and internal conflicts. As Jergovic is a great storyteller, he starts with the outside: Volga is not only black but glossy black like a piano. The reader realizes a main effect of storytelling: that war destroys, while stories nurture and continue life. Focal characteristics of the book are desire and strangeness, sadness and anger. Jergović’s car is a "documentary fantasy" and the story is about a generation living a lie. Jergović’s Yugoslavia lost in dreams of acting, the desire for truth is opposed illusions and dreams, lies and legends. Jergovic the master of melancholy presents driving as a journey into the past, awakens memories of companions, times of sadness and loneliness. A central figure in the novel is Jalal Pljevljak, who is the experienced driver and a Muslim believer, whose faith prohibits the consumption of alcohol, drunk, and so risked disaster. Although the reader gets the key to a mysterious accident, the second impression prevails: the uncertainty about where the boundaries between fact, facts, legends, dreams and lies are. The truth about things, it shows the contrasting perspectives of game storytelling, not just a matter of personal integrity and identity. Thus, the author briefly illuminates the history of the former Yugoslavia. As the scene of religious, ethnic and political relations and conflict within the former multinational federation determines the flow and actions, so, for example, accused Pljevljak, both Croat and Muslim. At the end of the wars in the nineties it was very popular among intellectuals and yellow press to relativize the guilt of the pre-war crime and surrender it to forgetfulness. So, the case Pljevljak for a reader is a metaphor of the fate of the whole country.

== Literary circles ==
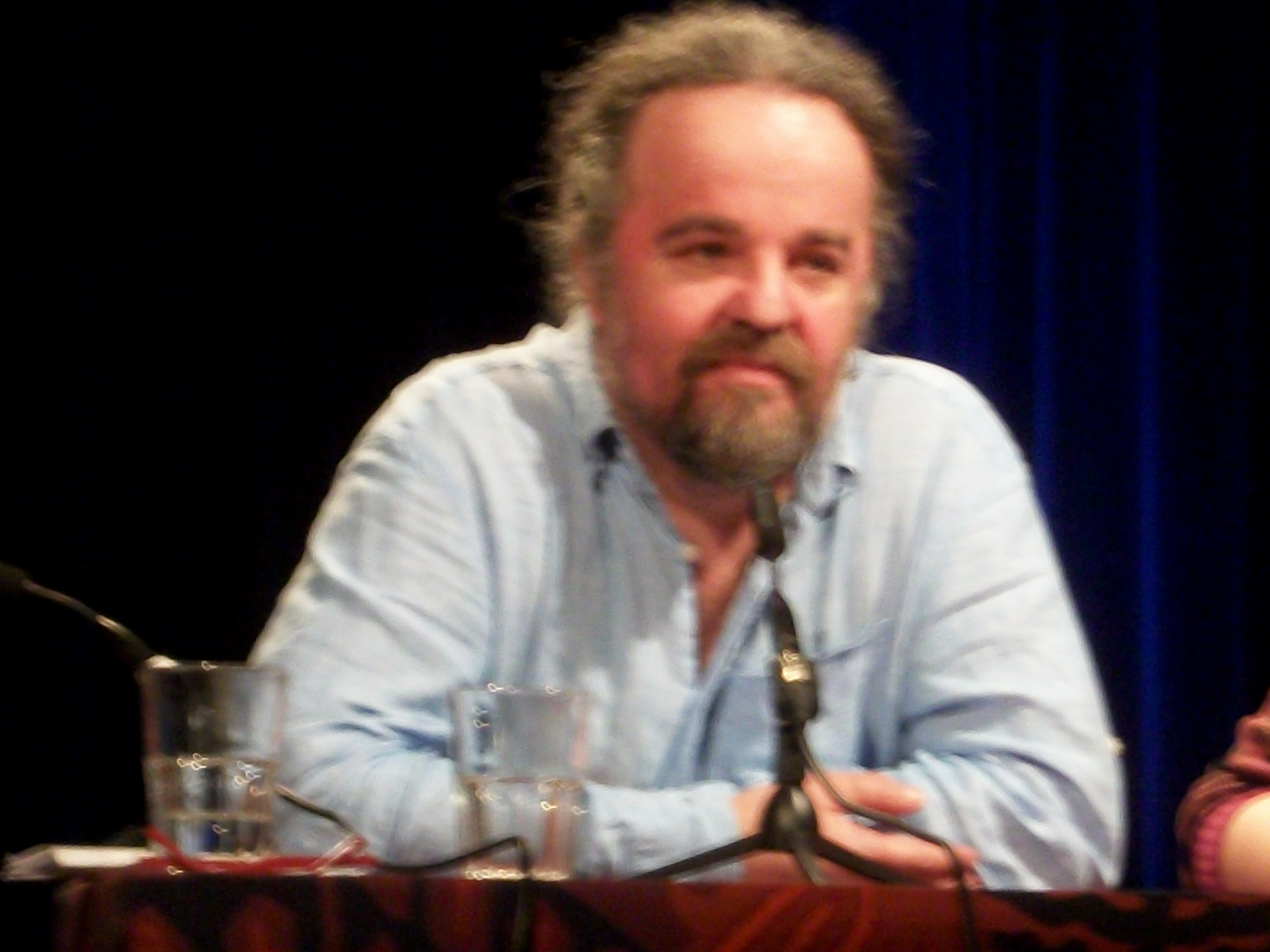
Jergović at the Kulturhaus in Graz, Austria, 23 March 2015

A number of private conflicts in literary circles drew public attention to disagreement among famous writers. Namely, issues in the Croatian Writers' Society created fragmentation and an alleged unjust disqualification of writers on political grounds. Over the course of his career, Jergović was involved in these issues, as were many other noteworthy writers. In October 2002, Jergović was elected to the Croatian Writers' Society board of directors. In 2003, there was criticism that one of CWS founders, Velimir Visković, was judging CWS members on political grounds. This was revealed when Drago Štambuk pointed out Visković's former association with the HDZ government. In April 2006, Jergović became involved in a literary dispute with Dražen Katunarić over Jergović's text on Houellebecq, which Jergović's considered charlatan for being based on the Qur'an. Katunarić said that such texts with a Sarajevan and Islamic basis are not accepted in Zagreb. To which Jergović responded for him to put a gun to his head. This controversy encouraged Zdravko Zima to resign his membership in the Croatian Writers' Society because he felt the leadership wasn't distancing themselves from the attacks on Katunarić. In April 2007, Jergović himself withdrew from CWS. Jergović said that the society contrasted his attitude to Croatian literature and literature in general. A number of other writers cut ties with the association in a similar fashion, including Ivan Lovrenović who resigned because he felt Velimir Visković's disqualification called for the real and symbolic dismissal of Jergović in 2011.

In 2009, Visković made public claims about Jergović reaffirming Chetniks in Serbia and setting out to market books for a Serbian market. Visković made these claims in response to an interview Jergović gave. Some questioned whether the reason for the conflict with Jergović was Visković's life project – the Encyclopedia of Croatian Literature. When CWS members asked Visković to apologize, he refused, citing years of insults to him, his family and other prominent writers.

== Personal life ==
Born in Sarajevo in 1966, Jergović spent half of his life in his hometown. He also spent the first year of the Bosnian War, more precisely the Siege of Sarajevo there, before moving to Zagreb in 1993.

Jergović has been known as an avid supporter of Sarajevo football club FK Željezničar, whose fan he has been since he was a kid, having a membership card of the club as well, renewing it in July 2019.

== Awards ==
In 2012, he received the Angelus Central European Literature Award for his book Srda pjeva, u sumrak, na Duhove ("Srda Sings at Dusk On Pentecost") and in 2018 he won the Georg Dehio Book Prize. In 2024 he received the Vilenica Prize, and for 2026 he is awarded the Leipzig Book Award for European Understanding for his book Trojica za Kartal. Sarajevski Marlboro remastered.

In 2023, his work Kin won the Best Prose Translation into English prize by AATSEEL with translator Russell Scott Valentino.

== Bibliography ==
- Opservatorija Varšava, poem collection, 1988
- Uči li noćas neko u ovom gradu japanski?, poem collection, 1992
- Himmel Comando, 1992
- Sarajevski Marlboro, short stories, 1994
  - English-language edition, Sarajevo Marlboro, translated by Stela Tomasevic. New York: Archipelago Books, 2004.
- Karivani, short stories, 1995
- Preko zaleđenog mosta, 1996
- Naci bonton, 1998
- Mama Leone, short stories, 1999, Zoro Sarajevo ISBN 978-9958-589-43-0
- Sarajevski Marlboro, Karivani i druge priče, short stories, 1999, Durieux Zagreb, ISBN 978-953-188-104-3
- Historijska čitanka, short stories, 2000, ISBN 978-953-201-602-4
- Kažeš anđeo, 2000
- Hauzmajstor Šulc, short stories, 2001
- Buick Riviera, novel, 2002, ISBN 978-86-83897-49-0
- Dvori od oraha, novel, 2003, ISBN 978-9958-717-64-2
  - English-language edition, The Walnut Mansion, translated by Stephen M. Dickey and Janja Pavetic Dickey. New Haven: Yale University Press. 2017.
- Rabija i sedam meleka, short stories, 2004, ISBN 978-9958-717-11-6
- Historijska čitanka 2, 2004, ISBN 978-953-201-892-9
- Inšallah Madona, inšallah, novel, 2004, ISBN 978-9958-717-33-8
- Glorija in excelsis, novel, 2005, Durieux Zagreb, ISBN 978-953-188-244-6
- Žrtve sanjaju veliku ratnu pobjedu, newspaper chronicles, 2006, Durieux Zagreb, ISBN 978-953-188-233-0
- Ruta Tannenbaum, novel, 2006, Durieux Zagreb, ISBN 978-953-188-237-8
- Drugi poljubac Gite Danon, selected stories, 2007, VBZ, Zagreb, ISBN 978-953-201-662-8
- Freelander, novel, 2007, Ajfelov most, Sarajevo/Zagreb ISBN 978-9958-591-01-3
- Srda pjeva, u sumrak, na Duhove, novel, 2009, Rende, Beograd, ISBN 978-86-83897-71-1
- Krađa, 2009
- Transantlantic mail, mail exchange with Semezdin Mehmedinović 2008–09, VBZ, Zagreb, 2009 ISBN 978-953-304-078-3
- Volga, Volga, novel, 2009, Naklada Ljevak, Zagreb ISBN 978-953-303-086-9
- Psi na jezeru, novel, 2010, Naklada Ljevak, Zagreb ISBN 978-953-303-305-1
- Otac, novel, 2010
- Rod, novel, 2013
  - English-language edition: Kin, translated by Russell Scott Valentino. New York: Archipelago Books, 2021.
- Tušt i tma, correspondence with Svetislav Basara, Laguna, Beograd, 2014
- Levijeva Tkaonica Svile, 2014
- Sarajevo, plan grada, 2015
- Drugi krug, correspondence with Svetislav Basara, Laguna, Beograd, 2015
- Imenik lijepih vještina, 2018
- Selidba, 2018
- Herkul, 2019
- Bajakovo-Batrovci, correspondence with Svetislav Basara, 2020
- Imenik lijepih vještina II, 2020

== Annotations ==
1. Miljenko Jergović, from the interview for 24sata.info:
  - Q (24sata.info): "Jesu li Vam dosadila pitanja da li ste više bh. ili hrvatski pisac i ako jesu, je li pametnije da Vas ništa ne pitamo u vezi s tim?
  - A (Miljenko Jergović): Normalno da su mi dosadila. Ja sam pisac onih koji me žele, onih koji čitaju moje knjige, razumiju ih iskustvom maternjeg jezika, a njihovu priču doživljavaju kao priču iz vlastitoga svijeta. Mislim da sam u jednome šampion među bosanskim piscima svih generacija: šampion sam u tome što sam se najviše puta izjasnio kao bosanski pisac.
