= The Doctrine of Awakening =

1943 book by Julius Evola

La dottrina del risveglio
- The Doctrine of Awakening: The Attainment of Self-Mastery According to the Earliest Buddhist Texts
- Author: Julius Evola
- Pages: 272 (Inner Traditions)

The Doctrine of Awakening is a book by Julius Evola, first published as La dottrina del risveglio in 1943, and translated into English by H. E. Musson in 1951. The book was based on translations from the Buddhist Pali Canon by Karl Eugen Neumann and Giuseppe De Lorenzo. Evola was not a practicing Buddhist, but the topic had personal significance to him, since a passage from the Majjhima Nikaya had dissuaded him from committing suicide in 1922. It was the first of Evola's works to be translated into English.

== Contents ==
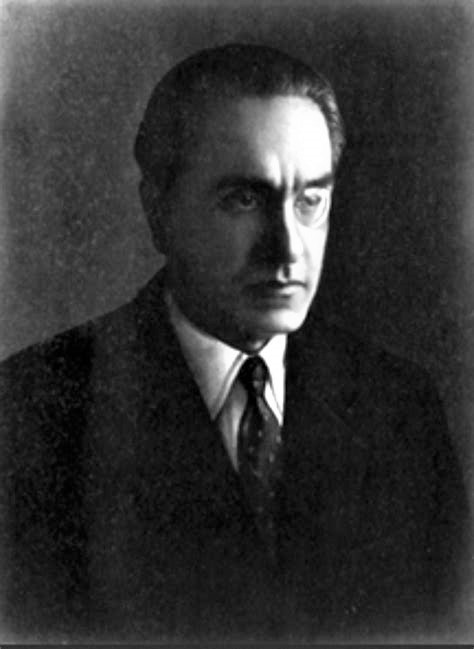
Julius Evola

The Doctrine of Awakening is divided into two main parts. The first part covers the principles of Buddhism, while the second part follows successive stages of Buddhist monastic practice, and takes up the majority of the book's length. Both parts combine summaries of doctrines taken from the Pali Canon with Evola's own analysis.

=== Part I ===
Evola begins the book with a discussion of the notion of ascesis, (Note: Italian: ascesi) noting that its meaning has diverged from its etymology in the Ancient Greek άσκέω lit. 'training' or 'discipline.' In the West, ascesis has instead become associated with mortification of the flesh under the influence of Christianity. Evola compares the original meaning of ascesis with the Indian practice of tapas. He argues that eastern forms of ascesis should not be seen with the negative connotations of Christian asceticism. Setting out to discuss an alternative to the prevailing Western view of ascesis, he selects Buddhism, particularly early Buddhism, as an example of an ascetic system that is "in tune with the spirit of Aryan man and yet prevailing in the modern age." (Note: Italian: conformi allo spirito di un uomo ario, eppure aventi riguardo per le condizioni stabilizzatesi nei tempi più recenti) He translates "Buddhism" as the "Doctrine of Awakening," (Note: Italian: dottrina del risveglio) stressing that Buddha is a title referring to an "Awakened One," not merely the name of the founder of Buddhism.

Having set out his intention to discuss Buddhist ascesis in the first chapter, Evola dedicates the second chapter to arguing that Buddhism is Aryan in nature. He notes the appearance of ariya in Pali Buddhist terms including ariya magga and ariya saccāni. Evola believes that this term has "spiritual, aristocratic, and racial significance" in Buddhism that cannot be translated. Evola further argues that Buddhism shares a common origin with other "Aryan" (Note: Italian: ario) and "Olympian" (Note: Italian: olimpico) forms of spirituality such as Platonism, Stoicism and Meister Eckhart's mysticism. According to Evola, the Ārya for whom Buddhism was intended were an aristocratic caste opposed both to the native "demoniacal" (Note: Italian: demoniche) races conquered by the Indo-Europeans, and to the "plebeian masses" (Note: Italian: massa [...] plebea) within Indo-European societies. As further evidence, Evola takes the Prince Siddhattha's birth as a Khattiya of the Sakya clan, the 32 attributes of a superior man, comparisons between Buddhist practice and physical battle in Pali texts, and the royal funeral rites performed after the Buddha's death.

The third chapter considers the historical context in which Buddhism arose. Evola begins by expressing his view that "objective" and valuable elements appear in all worthwhile spiritual traditions. He explains that no one tradition can be called original, but each arise from a combination of historical context and elements "rooted in a superindividual reality." (Note: Italian: radicato in una realtà superindividuale) Evola divides "pre-Buddhist Indo-Aryan traditions" between the Vedas and the later Brahmana and Upanishads. He argues that the Vedas represent neither a religion nor a philosophy, but a "sacred science." (Note: Italian: scienza sacra) They correspond to the "Olympian-Homeric phase" in Greek culture, when humanity saw itself as being in close contact with the Gods. The Vedas describe humanity entering communion with divinity through sacrificial rites. According to Evola, the Brahmana texts and Upanishads from around the 10th century BC represent developments in the tradition, the Brahmana demonstrating a turn from ritual as direct form of interaction with supersensible forces, to a theological and formalised rite performed by members of a priestly Brahmin caste; while the Upanishads philosophised the concept of the ātmā. By the time of the Buddha in the 6th century BC, speculative theology, pantheism, and belief in reincarnation had become prominent, trends Evola identifies as "decedent." Evola states that a distinction did not originally exist between a sacerdotal Brahmin caste, and the warrior and royal castes, and that it was the warrior nobility of the Kshatriya caste who were responsible for reactions against speculative and sacerdotal Brahmanism, through Jainism, Samkhya, and Buddhism. Evola considers Buddhism a revolt against the contemporary Brahamin caste, whose "representatives no longer preserved its dignity and had lost their qualifications." (Note: Italian: rappresentante ne conservasse sempre la dignità e la qualificazione) Regarding the problem of caste, Evola stresses that the Buddha recognised the value of the caste system for the majority of society; only the "spiritual apex of the Aryan hierarchy" (Note: Italian: l’àpice spirituale della gerarchia aria) needed to be revised on the merits of individual cases, so that the true ascetics could be found among the various castes. This is explained through a metaphor from the Assalāyana Sutta: "as one who desires fire does not ask the type of wood that in fact produces it, so from any caste may arise an ascetic or an Awakened One." Evola believes that Buddhism remains applicable in the modern day.

The remaining chapters of Part I comment on key doctrines contained in the Pali Canon. Evola describes the doctrine of the acinteyya or "unanswerable questions" as a means against speculative thought and the "demon of dialectics" (Note: Italian: dèmone della dialettica) in favour of a "superior type or criterion of certainty" (Note: Italian: superiore tipo o criterio di certezza) acquired through "immediate vision." (Note: Italian: ad un vedere) He likens the acinteyya to Kant's antinomies in Western philosophy. He contrasts the Brahmanical doctrine of ātma-samsāra with the Buddhist doctrines of anattā and impermanence, and likens the Buddhist understanding of samsāra to the Hellenic ideas of the cycle of generation (Note: Ancient Greek: κύκλος της γενέσεως) and the wheel of necessity. He then explains the ideas of khandha, santāna, nāmarūpa, dukkah, taṇhā, and upādāna with reference to the Pali Canon. According to Evola, Buddhism rejects belief in reincarnation, but teaches the existence of an impersonal samsaric continuity in the form of craving. He distinguishes two degrees of "samsāric consciousness," (Note: Italian: coscienza samsàrica) one that is bound to belief in an individual "I," and another wherein awareness stretches out in time and space. He accuses Western commentators of confusing the second kind of samsaric consciousness with "what is really unconditioned and extra-samsaric." (Note: Italian: ciò che è veramente incondizionato ed extrasamsàrico) Next he explains paṭiccasamuppāda, and each of the 12 nidanas, considering them as forming both a "samsaric, temporal, and horizontal chain", (Note: Italian: concatenazione samsàrica, temporale, orizzontale) and at the same time a "transcendental, vertical, and descending series". (Note: Italian: serie trascendentale verticale e discendente) He describes the conjoined role of samatha and vipassana–serenity and clear perception–in the Buddhist path. Since arousing vipassana is the beginning of the process of ascesis, Evola argues that original Buddhism is not universal, but aristocratic in nature. He justifies this view with reference to the Ayacana Sutta, in which the Buddha is reluctant to share his knowledge until he is shown the existence of "beings of a nobler kind" who have the capacity to understand it. In the last chapter of Part I, he reiterates the difference between Christian asceticism and Buddhist forms of renunciation, saying that the former is a painful practice born from resentment, while the latter is detachment brought about by awareness of the contingency of the world. One who follows this "Aryan" kind of renunciation rejects life not through self-mortification, but on the basis that life and death are "inadequate to his real nature." (Note: Italian: inadeguata alla sua vera natura)

=== Part II ===
In Part II, starting from Chapter 8, Evola sets out to provide a practical guide to Buddhist ascesis. He first considers the necessary conditions for practice, the first of which is birth as a human being. According to Evola, another condition is being of male sex. He cites the Bahudhātuka Sutta: "It is impossible, it cannot be that a woman should arrive at the full enlightenment of a Buddha, or become a universal sovereign." He then explains the five qualities of the "combatant," taken from the Kaṇṇakatthala Sutta. It is also necessary to remove "vain imaginings" of the past and future and cultivate simplicity in the mind. The first stage of in the ascetic path is pabbajja, "departure" in the literal sense, in which one abandons one's home and becomes a wandering ascetic. However, Evola argues that the core point is to abandon society, companions, and family in favour of solitude and freedom, and that in an internal and symbolical sense, departure might even be more easily achieved in the isolation of modern-day cities than in traditional civilisation.

Chapter 9 concerns harmful mental processes and the means to defend against them. Evola describes modern civilisation as one in which control over the mind is overlooked, and the focus is on control over external things. Uncontrolled, thought "walks by itself," switching focus from object to object without purpose. This leads to a state of passivity both in idleness and when a person becomes agitated or emotional. This pattern of thought corresponds to samsāric consciousness and must be brought under control, which is only possible through earnestness and interior calm. Following the Evola likens this process to a battle. Evola then lists the methods described in the Vitakka-Santhana Sutta for the removal of distracting thoughts. One must actively attack distractions that appear in the mind: "renounce a tendency or a thought, drive it away, root it out, suffocate it before it grows." Through this effort one gradually attains the four iddhipada.

Chapter 10 covers sīla, or "rightness." Evola distinguishes sila from mere morality, arguing that it represents a virile "uprightness," that the virtues of sīla are to be understood as "duties to oneself," and that ethical precepts have purely instrumental value in Buddhism. He then comments in detail on each of the five precepts, the five hindrances, and the elements of the Noble Eightfold Path.

Chapter 11 covers satipatthāna, whose purpose is "to begin to disengage the central principle of one's own being by means of an objective and detached consideration." (Note: Italian: cominciar già a disimpegnare il principio centrale del proprio essere per mezzo di una considerazione oggettiva, distaccata) Evola discusses the 4 groups of the satipatthāna and their substages in succession: the contemplation of breath, of the parts of the body, of the elements which form the body, and of the decay of the body after death; the contemplation of feelings; the contemplation of the mind; and the contemplation of Dhamma. Evola stresses that the habits of awareness developed through satipatthana should spread to encompass all elements of everyday life. Combined with sila, satipatthana leads to "intimate, unalloyed joy."

"Through love the ascetic feels himself in all beings, noble or common, happy and unhappy, both of this world and of every other world; he feels their destiny as though it were his own, he takes upon himself the contingency of their life, he feels with their feeling or suffering (compassion)—but he then irradiates joy, as if the darkness in each being had dissolved, as if the feeling he irradiates were beneficial to the beings and were sustaining, clarifying, and liberating them" (Note: Italian: Attraverso l’amore l’asceta si sente in tutti gli esseri, nobili e volgari, felici ed infelici, di questo mondo come d’ogni altro mondo, fa cone se il loro destino fosse il suo stesso destino, assume la contingenza della loro vita, si sente nel loro sentire o patire (com-passione) - ma successivamente irradia gioia, come se l’oscurità di ogni essere dovesse risolversi, come se il sentimento che s’irradia fosse propizio agli esseri, li sostenesse, li schiarisse, li liberasse.)

Chapter 12 concerns jhāna. Evola states that, if the Buddhist ascesis stopped at samadhi, it might be comparable to Western stoicism, but due to the jhana it goes beyond apatheia, (Note: Ancient Greek: ἀπάθεια) which is the final goal and limit of Stoical practice. Even samatha, the equivalent of apatheia, becomes a bond than must be transcended in the path of awakening. Evola comments on each of the four Jhāna. He then stresses the importance of a concentrated will and avoiding inclinations and distractions in the development of the jhana. Even feelings of satisfaction arising from the attainment of each jhana must be ignored. Evola says that, though Each of the Jhanas can vary in the intensity of its realisation, they are not mere psychological states and must be understood as having ontological significance. Evola indicates that is an alternative "wet" counterpart to the "dry" path of the jhana with equivalent effects, in the form of the four brahmavihara-bhavana, these being the irradiences of "love," "compassion," "sympathetic joy," and finally "immutability." Evola spends the rest of the chapter discussing love, distinguishing between natural and supernatural forms thereof.

Chapter 13 concerns the arupa-jhāna, which correspond to the jhana, but within the realm of formlessness, and which lead to nirvana. Before listing these jhana, Evola describes several auxiliary techniques that may be used in preparation for the arupa-jhana, particularly focussing on a meditative method known as kasina. He then exposits the five arupa-jhāna, as well as separate path that, similarly to the brahmavihara-bhavana of the previous stage, leads to the same end through a series of visions.

Chapter 14 describes iddhi, psychic powers believed to be produced through advanced Buddhist practice. The iddhi are divided hierarchically between magical powers, powers of manifestation, and "powers that work in the miracle of the doctrine and of right discernment." Evola explains various iddhi in relation to Buddhist doctrines and stages of spiritual development.

Chapter 15 argues that Buddhism is "anti-evolutionist" and "vertical" in nature, having no place for "becoming." Evola also argues that Buddhism does not condemn suicide in the case of those who have already attained liberation, and gives the metaphore of burning chips to explain the four stages of awakening

Chapter 16 concerns nibbāna. Evola lists several possible interpretations of the etymology of the term, defining it as the extinction of mania and craving. In this respect he compares it to the "negation of the negation" in the Hegelian dialectic. Evola argues that Buddhism developed a kind of negative theology, in that it is seen as absurd to describe nibbana in terms of what it is. But it also goes beyond negative theology in that "it has refused to use the category of nonbeing and has understood that even to define the unconditioned by negation would, in fact, make it conditioned." Evola recalls the acinteyya from Part I: "When it is asked if the Awakened One exists after death, the answer is: No. Does not he, then, exist after death? The same answer." Evola critiques those who compare nibbana to the pre-Buddhist ātmā, saying that the latter characterised by its connection to Brahman, "the root of cosmic life," while nibbana is characterised by its overcoming of this relation.

In Chapter 17, Evola describes the trio of sunnatā "void," animitta "the signless," and appanihita "that without inclination or tendency" that characterise the "perfection of knowledge" or prajnāpāramitā. On this basis, Evola introduces the core ideas of Mahayana Buddhism, particularly Madhyamika and the Two truths doctrine. After early Buddhism became divided into the Hinayana and Mahayana schools, Evola considers these doctrines to have degraded in two unique ways: the ascesis of the Hinayana schools lost ground to rigid monastic ethics; Mahayana attempted to philosophise experiential ascetic states on an intellectual basis. Evola then discusses the Mahayana ideas of the Tathāgata and Bodhisattva, and of non-duality between samsara and nirvana.

Chapter 18 concerns Zen, a particular form of Mahayana Buddhism found today in Japan. Evola explains that, as Mahayana Buddhism lost its exclusively aristocratic status, it absorbed more local religious elements, leading Buddhas and Boddhisattvas to be deified and worshiped, and to an intensified belief in reincarnation. On the other hand, Mahayana became increasingly philosophical and speculative, leading to systems of thought, such as that of Nagarjuna, that resemble Western Idealist philosophies that would emerge centuries later. Zen, Evola claims, was able to renew the "exigency" with which Buddhism originally opposed itself to "Brahmanic speculation and ritualism." Zen rejects "speculations, canonical writings, rites," and "religious aberrations." Evola repeats several Zen allegories and tales to illustrate this attitude. Zen insists on sudden spiritual awakening or satori (悟り), which appears without any origin or "becoming". According to Evola, the preparatory methods of Zen are not essentially different from the original Aryan ascesis. After listing these methods, Evola describes the symbols of the Five Ranks and Ten Bulls in Zen practice. Decades after the publication of The Doctrine of Awakening, Evola would go on to write three more short works on Zen: Che cosa è lo Zen "What is Zen?" in 1956, and La via del samurai "The Way of the Samurai" and Senso e clima dello Zen "The Meaning and Context of Zen" in the 1970s. A modified version of Senso e clima dello Zen was used as an introduction to the Italian translation of D. T. Suzuki's Essays in Zen Buddhism.

Chapter 19 concludes the work by asking how the elements of ascesis gathered in the book might be applied in the modern day. Evola states that modern world stands at the opposite spiritual extreme from an ascetic view of life. According to Evola this is typified by Activism and its attendant philosophies, which exalt "force, impetus, becoming, struggle, transformation, perennial research, or ceaseless movement." "Being" is disregarded in favour of "becoming, life, movement, development, or history." Evola describes the modern world as one of "tumult," "agitation," "fever for speed," and "mechanization devoted to the shortening of all intervals of space and time," in which "the demon of collectivism" rules over restless beings. Evola sees this situation as a whole as unrectifiable, but hopes that a small elite of "qualified individuals" might be able to embrace strict ascetic values. Evola once again stresses that this refers to the Aryan form ascesis, as opposed to "renunciation, flight from the world, inaction, quiet-ism, or mortification." He also reminds us that this form of ascesis is not exclusive to Buddhism or Eastern traditions in general, also being present in authors such as Plotinus and Aristotle, and in Roman Stoicism. Evola returns to Zen as an example of how Buddhist ascesis complements an "Olympian" "heroic" worldview among the Samurai nobility. Evola concludes the book by warning against erroneous forms of "spiritualism," and calling for return to the origins and reintegration of ancient traditions.

== Reception ==
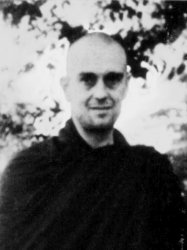
Ñāṇavīra Thera

The translator of the work, H. E. Musson stated that "the author has, it seems to me, recaptured the spirit of Buddhism in its original form, and his schematic and uncompromising approach will have rendered an inestimable service even if it does no more than clear away some of the woolly ideas that have gathered round the central figure, Prince Siddhattha, and round the doctrine that he disclosed." Musson was inspired to become a bhikkhu from reading The Doctrine of Awakening in 1945 while hospitalised in Sorrento, and was later given the monastic name Ñāṇavīra Thera. In Il Cammino del Cinabro "The Path of Cinnabar" (1963) Evola refers to Musson's conversion: "The person who translated the work, a certain Mutton [sic], found in it an incitant to leave Europe and withdraw to the Orient in the hope of finding there a centre where one still cultivated the disciplines that I recommended; unfortunately, I have had no further news of him." Harry Oldmeadow described Evola's work on Buddhism as exhibiting a Nietzschean influence, but Evola criticised Nietzsche's purported anti-ascetic prejudice. Arthur Versluis described Evola's book as "far from accurate, being more a vehicle for his own theory of personal immortality." Sandro Consolato has written a sympathetic overview of Evola's approach to Buddhism Evola wrote that his book "had the chrism of the Pali Society." Luciano Pirrotta believes that this claim is a fabrication; however, according to Gianfranco De Turris, it merely refers to the fact that the English edition of the book was originally published by Luzac & Company, for whom the Pali Text Society acted as an editorial consultant on Buddhist topics.

== Translations ==
- The Doctrine of Awakening, H. E. Musson, 1951, English
- La doctrine de l'Éveil, Pierre Pascal, 1956, French
- A felébredés doktrínája, Dávid Andrea, 2003, Hungarian
