= Russell Scott Valentino =

American translator

Russell Scott Valentino is a literary scholar, translator, author, editor, and professor of Slavic and comparative literature at Indiana University. His work has been published by the New York Times, Reaktion Books, The Harvard Review, Yale University Press, and a dozen other literary magazines and book publishers. The former editor of The Iowa Review and publisher of Autumn Hill Books, Valentino served on the 2022 jury for the National Book Awards. His translation of Miljenko Jergovic’s Kin (Archipelago Books 2021) received AATSEEL’s 2023 Best Prose Translation award.

== Biography ==
Valentino grew up on a small farm in Clovis, California. He received a B.A. (in Russian and English) from California State University, Fresno and M.A. and Ph.D. in Slavic Languages and Literatures from the University of California, Los Angeles in 1993. A student of Michael Henry Heim, he has published eight book-length literary translations from Italian, Russian, and Croatian and been awarded three National Endowment for the Arts Fellowships for literary translation. His two scholarly monographs focus on Russian literary works of the nineteenth and twentieth centuries. He has also co-edited three collections of essays, including, with Sean Cotter and Esther Allen, the 2014 retrospective The Man Between: Michael Henry Heim & a Life in Translation (Open Letter Books). He served as Editor-in-Chief at The Iowa Review from 2009 to 2013, as President of the American Literary Translators Association from 2013 to 2016, and as chair of the Department of Slavic and East European Languages and Cultures at Indiana University from 2013 to 2016 and from 2021 to 2025.

== Books ==
- Vicissitudes of Genre in the Russian Novel (2001) explores genre mixing in works by Ivan Turgenev, Fyodor Dostoevsky, Nikolai Chernyshevsky, and Maksim Gorky.
- The Woman in the Window: Commerce, Consensual Fantasy, and the Quest for Masculine Virtue in the Russian Novel (2014) examines the historical construction of virtue and its relation to the rapidly shifting economic context in modern Russia.
- Materada, by Fulvio Tomizza (translated from the Italian)
- Persuasion and Rhetoric, by Carlo Michelstaedter (translated from the Italian, with David Depew, and Cinzia Sartini Blum)
- Between Exile and Asylum: An Eastern Epistolary, by Predrag Matvejević (translated from the Croatian)
- A Castle in Romagna, by Igor Štiks (translated from the Croatian, with Tomislav Kuzmanović)
- The Silence of the Sufi, by Sabit Madaliev (translated from the Russian)
- Anima Mundi, by Susanna Tamaro (translated from the Italian, with Cinzia Sartini Blum)
- The Other Venice: Secrets of the City, by Predrag Matvejević (translated from the Croatian)
- Kin, by Miljenko Jergović (translated from the Croatian). New York: Archipelago Books, 2021.
- Discoveries: New Writing from the Iowa Review, edited with Erica Mena
- The Man Between: Michael Henry Heim & A Life in Translation, edited with Esther Allen and Sean Cotter
- Project on the Rhetoric of Inquiry (POROI) Special Issue on Rhetoric and Translation, with Jacob Emery, Sibelan Forrestor, and Tomislav Kuzmanović
- Historical Roots of the Wondertale, by Vladimir Yakovlevich Propp (translated from the Russian, with Miriam Shrager and Sibelan Forrester)

== Honors ==
- Fulbright-Hays Faculty Research Award (1999-2000)
- National Endowment for the Arts Literary Translation Award (2002)
- Long-list Nominee for the International Dublin Literary Award (2005)
- Howard Foundation Award for Literary Translation (2005)
- National Endowment for the Arts Literary Translation Award (2010)
- National Endowment for the Arts Literary Translation Award (2016)
- PEN/Heim Translation Award (2016)
- Best Prose Translation, American Association of Teachers of Slavic and East European Languages (2023)
- Fulbright U.S. Scholar (2024-2025)
