= Carolina Luzzatto =

Italian journalist and politician (1837–1919)

- Born: Carolina Sabbadini; 29 November 1837; Trieste
- Died: 24 January 1919 (aged 81); Gorizia
- Occupations: Writer; Journalist
- Spouse: Girolamo Luzzatto Coen
- Relatives: Carlo Michelstaedter (nephew)

Carolina Luzzatto (née: Sabbadini; 1837–1919) was a journalist and writer from Austria-Hungary. She was one of the early female newspaper directors in Italy and was part of the irredentist liberal-national journalists of the period.

== Biography ==
She was born in Trieste on 29 November 1837 to the Sabbadini family of Jewish religion and of Sephardic origin. She was the eldest daughter of Isach Sabbadini and Stellina Estella Norsa, originally from Mantua. Philosopher Carlo Michelstaedter was her nephew. She was educated by Marco Tedeschi who was her relative and the chief rabbi of the Jewish community in Trieste.

She married Girolamo Luzzatto Coen in 1856 and moved to Gorizia. She started her literary career in 1868 by publishing children's books and continued her activity until 1875. She directed the newspaper L’Isonzo from 1878 to 1880 and became the director of the newspapers Il Raccoglitore and L’Imparziale in 1880. She was the director of the newspaper Il Corriere di Gorizia between 1883 and 1889 and of the newspaper Il Corriere Friulano between 1901 and 1914. She also worked for different publication as their correspondent in Gorizia, including Il Piccolo, Patria del Friuli and Le Pagine Friulane. From 30 January 1870 she contributed to a women's magazine entitled La Donna.

In 1915 Luzzatto was arrested at age 78 due to her commitment to the irredentist cause. She jailed in the Göllersdorf and then in Ober Hollabrunn. She died on 24 January 1919 in Gorizia shortly after she was released from the prison. She was buried at the Valdirose cemetery in the Nova Gorica suburb of Rožna Dolina.
