= Carlo Michelstaedter =

Italian philosopher and artist (1887–1910)

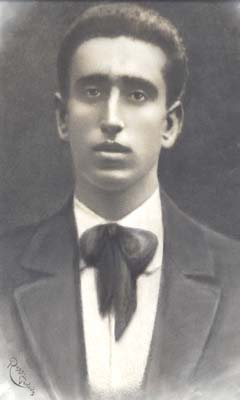
- Born: 3 June 1887; Gorizia, Princely County of Gorizia and Gradisca, Austria-Hungary
- Died: 17 October 1910 (aged 23); Gorizia, Princely County of Gorizia and Gradisca, Austria-Hungary

Philosophical work
- Era: 20th-century philosophy
- Region: Italian philosophy
- School: Continental philosophy Philosophical pessimism
- Notable works: Persuasion and Rhetoric

Carlo Raimondo Michelstaedter or Michelstädter (German pronunciation: [ˈmɪçl̩ˌʃtɛtɐ]; 3 June 1887 – 17 October 1910) was an Italian philosopher, artist, and man of letters.

== Life ==
Carlo Michelstaedter was born in Gorizia, the capital of the Austro-Hungarian County of Gorizia and Gradisca, the youngest of four children of Albert and Emma Michelstaedter (née Luzzatto). His full name was Carlo Raimondo (Gedaliah Ram). His father was the director of the local branch of the Trieste-based Assicurazioni Generali insurance company. The Michelstaedters were an Italian-speaking upper middle class Jewish family of Ashkenazi origin.

His sister Paula remembered him as a child fearful of the dark and heights, stubborn and not at all prepared to apologize for any misbehavior. In school, he was judged "not very suitable" for having intentionally and frequently disturbed the lessons during the year.

His father was also the chairman of the Gabinetto di Lettura Goriziano, a local cultural association for the fostering of literary culture, and he pushed his son towards literary study. His mother Emma Luzzatto came from an old and renowned Jewish family of Italian irredentist leanings. His aunt was Carolina Luzzatto, who was also a supporter of Italian irredentism. Carlo was considered an introverted boy, but by the end of high school (completed in Gorizia), he developed into a brilliant, athletic, intelligent youth. He enrolled in the department of mathematics at the University of Vienna, but soon moved to Florence, a city he savored for its arts and language. There he formed friendships with other students, and in the end, enrolled in the department of letters of the local Istituto di Studi Superiori (1905). He majored in Greek and Latin, and selected for his laurea thesis a philosophical study of persuasion and rhetoric in ancient philosophy. In 1909 he returned to Gorizia and set himself to work on the thesis.

Around the fall of 1910, he completed his work, finishing the appendices by 17 October. He was very tired, and that day he had a fight with his mother, who complained he had not wished her a happy birthday. Left alone, Carlo took a loaded pistol he kept in the house and killed himself with two shots. The reasoning behind his suicide has been a subject of much debate; some see it as the natural conclusion to his philosophy, others see it as a result of some kind of mental illness. One of his friends from Florence, a Russian woman, had also killed herself, as had a brother who lived in America. He is buried in the Jewish cemetery in Rožna Dolina near Nova Gorica, Slovenia. As his family was Jewish, they were sent to Auschwitz; only one sister escaped to Switzerland.

Friends and relatives published his works and collected his writings, now in the Biblioteca Civica di Gorizia.

Not only did he write Persuasion and Rhetoric, but many stories, plays and dialogues; thousands of unfinished pages, most of which have been only translated to Spanish.

== Thought ==
For Michelstaedter, common life is an absence of life, narrow and deluded as it is by the god of pleasure, which deceives man, promising pleasures and results that are not real, although man thinks they are. Rhetoric—that is, the conventions of the individual, the weak, and society—comprises social life, in which man overpowers nature and himself for his own pleasure. Only by living in the present as if every moment were the last can man free himself from the fear of death, and thus achieve Persuasion; that is, self-possession. Resignation and adapting oneself to the world, for Michelstaedter, is the true death.

His thought has been recognized as a precursor of Heidegger in philosophy, of Wittgenstein in the critique of language, of Derrida in hermeneutics.

There are three phases in the development of his philosophy.

Between 1905 and 1907 – his university years – Michelstaedter's thought was characterized by a decadent, "Dannunzian" influence, albeit with constant attention to the relationship between the individual and society, to everything social that impedes the individual's expression of singularity.

From late 1907 through 1908, Michelstaedter made a key contribution in Europe to the study of the tragic as a possible means of salvaging an immanent meaning, a resistant centre to the "crisis of the foundations" that had transformed existence. In 1908 Michelstaedter added his voice to those of Henrik Ibsen, Otto Weininger, Scipio Slataper, and Giovanni Amendola in Italy, who would turn to "tragic thought" as a response to the abyss opened by nihilism.

In 1909, catalysed by the task of writing a university thesis on the concepts of persuasion and rhetoric in the works of Plato and Aristotle, Michelstaedter's thought underwent a shift – one that would continue after he returned to Gorizia. His analysis now sought to provide the possibility of resisting the abstracting force that social consensus exercised on both philosophical and quotidian forms of thought. It is clear in his later writings that he understood that all philosophical approaches must be analysed in terms of how they are abstracted (alienated) from themselves within the structures of societal consensus. Building on this foundation, he came to understand culture as societal behavior rather than as something created by the subject; this paved the way for a series of reflections on the relationship between epistemology and ideological consensus that would have more in common with Lukács's ideas in History and Class Consciousness (1922).

== Philosophy ==
His thesis deals with many themes including language, existence, justice, salvation and the institutionalized.

''Their degeneration is called civil education, their hunger is the activity of progress, their fear is morality, their violence and egoistic hatred—the sword of justice.''

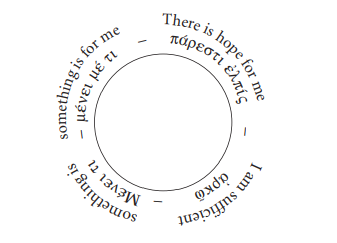
This is the exit-less circle of illusory individuality, which affirms a persona, an end, a reason: inadequate persuasion, in that it is adequate only to the world it creates for itself

Making use of Hegel, Marx and Schopenhauer he develops a thesis to show the violence in organized society, and how man is kept slave, by making use of Hegel's master-slave dialectic (a similar reading of Hegel would be later done by Kojeve), the master gives the slave a right to exist, and thus a right to life for his violence, and that he should want, going after never ending pleasure and needs. Violence against nature which becomes violence against man in organized society with property, this is how Rhetoric is maintained in society, with the atomizing of life starting with laws, humans rights, the exploitation of past labor and money.

Rhetoric is illusory individuality opposite of which is Persuasion, organized society affirms "philopsychia" for every individual, that he should love his life, his security guaranteed and his fear of death is rational.

For Michelstaedter, the will is not metaphysical or exists in idealistic sense, the will is strictly material. It is shaped by the subject's material reality, the society one lives in.

Michelstaedter's will extends beyond the will of the subject to include the subject's state of need. Will is the phenomenological manner in which the subject interprets the world propelled by his state of need; it is a state of dissatisfaction that leads him to situate his momentary will/need as the basis of his entire interpretation of reality. In the moment of need, the subject reads all of reality according to the characteristics of his own needs.

When this mechanism is extended from the individual to the whole of society, the result is what Michelstaedter describes as "correlativity", that is, a system of contrasting wills that leads individuals to see everything contained in the real (including other subjects) in relation to their own needs, and thus as objects to be annexed for their "usefulness".

== Poetry ==
Michelstaedter ventured into poetry as well as art. The topics can range to different things, but all have to do with either rhetoric or persuasion. Heavily influenced by Giacomo Leopardi, he felt a lack in his poetry seeing the similarity. However, the work should be regarded equally as important; in the poem "I Figli del Mare", Michelstaedter profoundly writes about persuasion and rhetoric in a poetic way.

The poem in question can be understood as it follows that the struggle in the fury of the sea is never-ending, it never-achieves its goal, and thus necessarily and unavoidably implies a degree of error. But what differentiates this erring from the mistakes of the land is that it is, so to speak, an erring in the right direction. Michelstaedter outlines the "way to persuasion", as "research with negative data" (46), and does so in ways which are coherent with Itti's and Senia's call.

This implied will is channeled inside a hyperbolic (rhetorically and mathematically) (41) path of emancipation from and resistance to rhetoric that only ad infinitum would come to join the asymptotic line ("retta", both "line" and "righteous", "correct") of Justice, absolute persuasion and self-possession. In this context, the way to persuasion is an infinite path through and in error, and moving in the right direction implies awareness of one's own inadequacy and a consistent self-reflexive negation of any rhetorically affirmed value.

"By making his life more and more rich in negations, creating the world for himself" (La Persuasione 45) and, on the other, "since he has the honesty to always feel insufficient in front of the infinite potestas, he becomes more and more sufficient to things, more and more deeply enough to the eternal deficiency of things. In him, almost in an individual nucleus, more and more large determinations are organized. [...] Therefore in his presence, in his acts, in his words he reveals himself, he "enuclea," a life that transcends the myopia of men becomes near, concrete [...]. Therefore, every word of his is luminous because, with depth of connections between each other, he creates the presence of what is far away "(48).

== Works ==
- Il dialogo della salute (1909), edited by Sergio Campailla. Milano: Adelphi Edizioni, 1988.
- Poesie (1905–1910), edited by Sergio Campailla. Milano: Adelphi Edizioni, 1987
- La persuasione e la rettorica, translated as Persuasion and Rhetoric with an introduction and commentary by Russell Scott Valentino, Cinzia Sartini Blum, and David J. Depew (Yale University Press, 2004, ISBN 0-300-10434-0)
- La persuasione e la rettorica – Appendici critiche, edited by Sergio Campailla. Milano: Adelphi Edizioni, 1995.
- Epistolario, edited by Sergio Campailla. Milano: Adelphi Edizioni, 1983.
- Diario e scritti vari
- Opere, edited by G. Chiavacci, Sansoni, Firenze 1958
- Scritti scolastici, edited by Sergio Campailla, Gorizia 1976
- Parmenide ed Eraclito. Empedocle : Appunti di filosofia, edited by Alfonso Cariolato and Enrico Fongaro. Milano: SE, 2003.
- Another English translation of La Persuasione e La Rettorica exists, by Wilhelm Snyman and Giuseppe Stellardi, with an introduction by Giuseppe Stellardi, published by University of KwaZulu-Natal Press, South Africa, January 2007. Preface by Wilhelm Snyman. ISBN 978-1-86914-091-5.
- La melodia del giovane divino, edited by Sergio Campailla. Milano: Adelphi Edizioni, 2010.
