= Solkan =

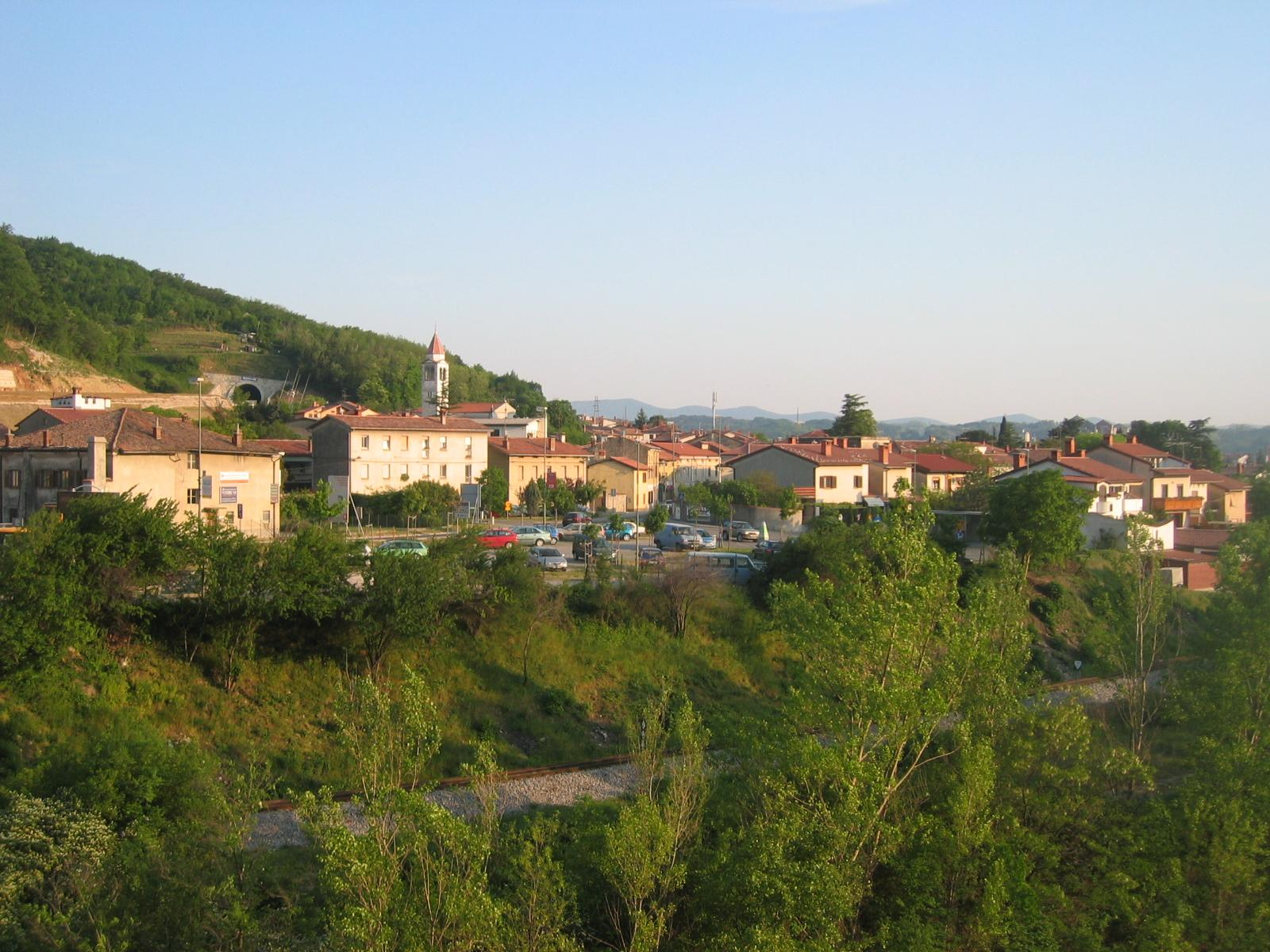

- Location in Slovenia
- Coordinates: 45°58′10.19″N 13°38′43.77″E
- Country: Slovenia
- Traditional region: Slovenian Littoral
- Statistical region: Gorizia
- Municipality: Nova Gorica

Area
  - Total: 4.2 km^{2} (1.6 sq mi)
- Elevation: 94.3 m (309 ft)

Population (2015)
  - Total: 3,227

Solkan (pronounced [ˈsoːu̯kan] or [sɔu̯ˈkan]; Italian: Salcano, German: Sollingen or Salcano) is a settlement in the Municipality of Nova Gorica in the Gorizia region of western Slovenia, at the border with Italy. Although it forms a single urban area with the city of Nova Gorica today, it has maintained the status of a separate urban settlement due to its history and the strong local identity of its residents.

The parish church in the settlement is dedicated to Saint Stephen and belongs to the Diocese of Koper.

== History ==
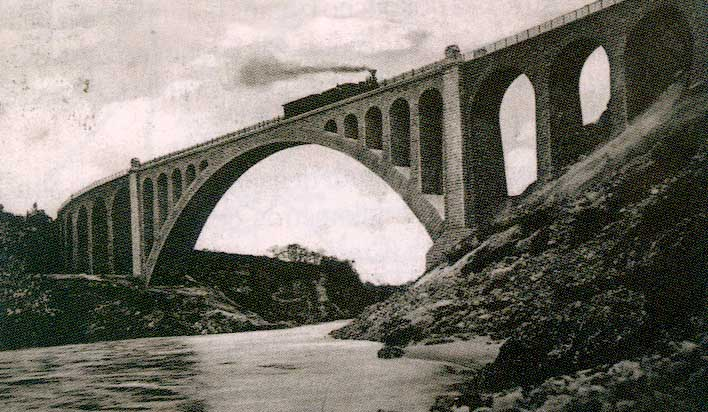
The Solkan Bridge, destroyed during the Battles of the Isonzo in 1916 and rebuilt in 1927

Solkan was first mentioned in 1001, in the same document as the neighbouring town of Gorizia (now in Italy), which was then still a village. During the rule of the Counts of Gorizia in the Middle Ages, Gorizia developed into an important urban settlement, while Solkan maintained its predominantly rural character. Contrary to Gorizia, in which the Friulian and later Venetian language prevailed over Slovene by the end of the 16th century, Solkan has remained an essentially Slovene-speaking village.

In the 18th century, the incorporation of Solkan into the urban area of Gorizia slowly began, as many local noble families built their residences in it. In the second half of the 19th century, it developed into an important center of the furnishing industry. The expansion of nearby Gorizia was transforming Solkan into a suburb.

According to the last Austrian census of 1910, Solkan had 3075 inhabitants, of whom 90.3% were Slovenes; the rest was mostly composed of German speakers (5.2%) and few Italian- and Friulian-speaking families.

During World War I, the village was almost completely destroyed in the Battles of the Isonzo. After the collapse of Austria-Hungary in 1918, it became part of the Kingdom of Italy, together with all the County of Gorizia and Gradisca. Its predominantly Slovene population suffered under the policies of Fascist Italianization from the 1920s to 1940s. In 1925, it was abolished as a separate municipality and merged with Gorizia. Nevertheless, Solkan remained a separate settlement because of the hindered urban expansion of Gorizia after the annexation to Italy. During World War II, it became one of the major centers of Partisan resistance in the Julian March.

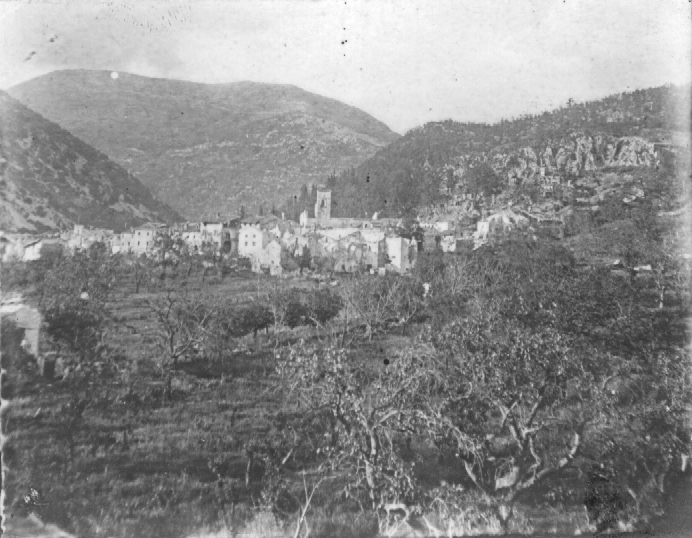
Solkan after World War II

In 1947, Solkan was annexed to the Socialist Federal Republic of Yugoslavia, while Gorizia remained in Italy, thus cutting off the secular connection of the two settlements. The same year, the construction of a new town of Nova Gorica began in the area previously occupied by vineyards and fields mostly belonging to the rural area of Solkan. In 1952, the City of Nova Gorica was created and Solkan was incorporated into it. Since then, it has gradually merged with the modern town of Nova Gorica, although it has been since 1988 an autonomous settlement and has a pronounced local identity.

== Language, ethnicity and culture ==
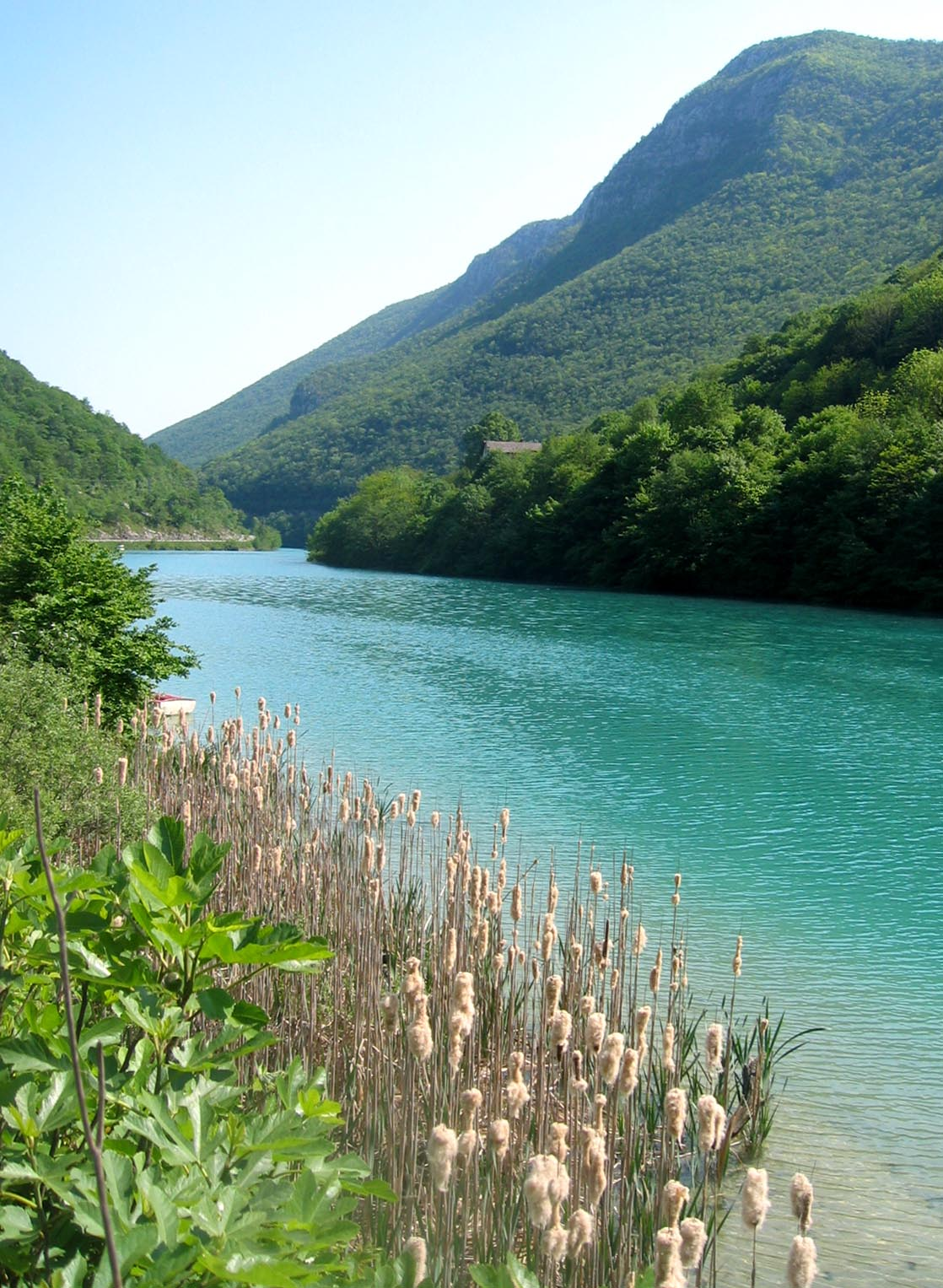
The Soča River near Solkan

Solkan has been a largely Slovene settlement. It has however also had different ethnic and linguistic minorities. Since the Middle Ages, many Friulians have lived in Solkan, but they have been now mostly assimilated. Italians lived here mostly between the late 19th and early 20th century, but after 1947 they mostly fled to Italy or assimilated to the Slovene majority. Immigrants from other regions of former Yugoslavia started settling in Solkan from early 1970s. Today, Slovenes represent around 90% of the population, the remaining 10% are mostly Serbs, Croats, and Bosnians, together with smaller numbers of Italians and Albanians.

According to the census of 1991, 91% of the population spoke Slovene as their first language. Serbo-Croatian came second with a little less than 8%. The native inhabitants of Solkan speak a variant of the Karst dialect of Slovene. The Solkan variant of the dialect served as the basis for the development of the urban dialect of Nova Gorica, which emerged with the second generation of settlers of the town. The Solkan dialect has become well known throughout Slovenia since the early 1990s because the singer-songwriter Iztok Mlakar uses it in the lyrics of his songs.

The culture of Solkan has been strongly influenced by the contacts with neighbouring Italian region of Friuli. The influence can be felt in the local cuisine, language, customs and traditions.

Its most prominent landmark is the Solkan Bridge, built between 1904 and 1905. It is a bridge over the Soča on the Jesenice-to-Nova Gorica railway. It is 220 m long with a central arch spanning 85 m, making it the longest stone arch spanning a river and the longest stone-arch railway bridge in the world. The original bridge railing was designed by Otto Wagner.

== People ==
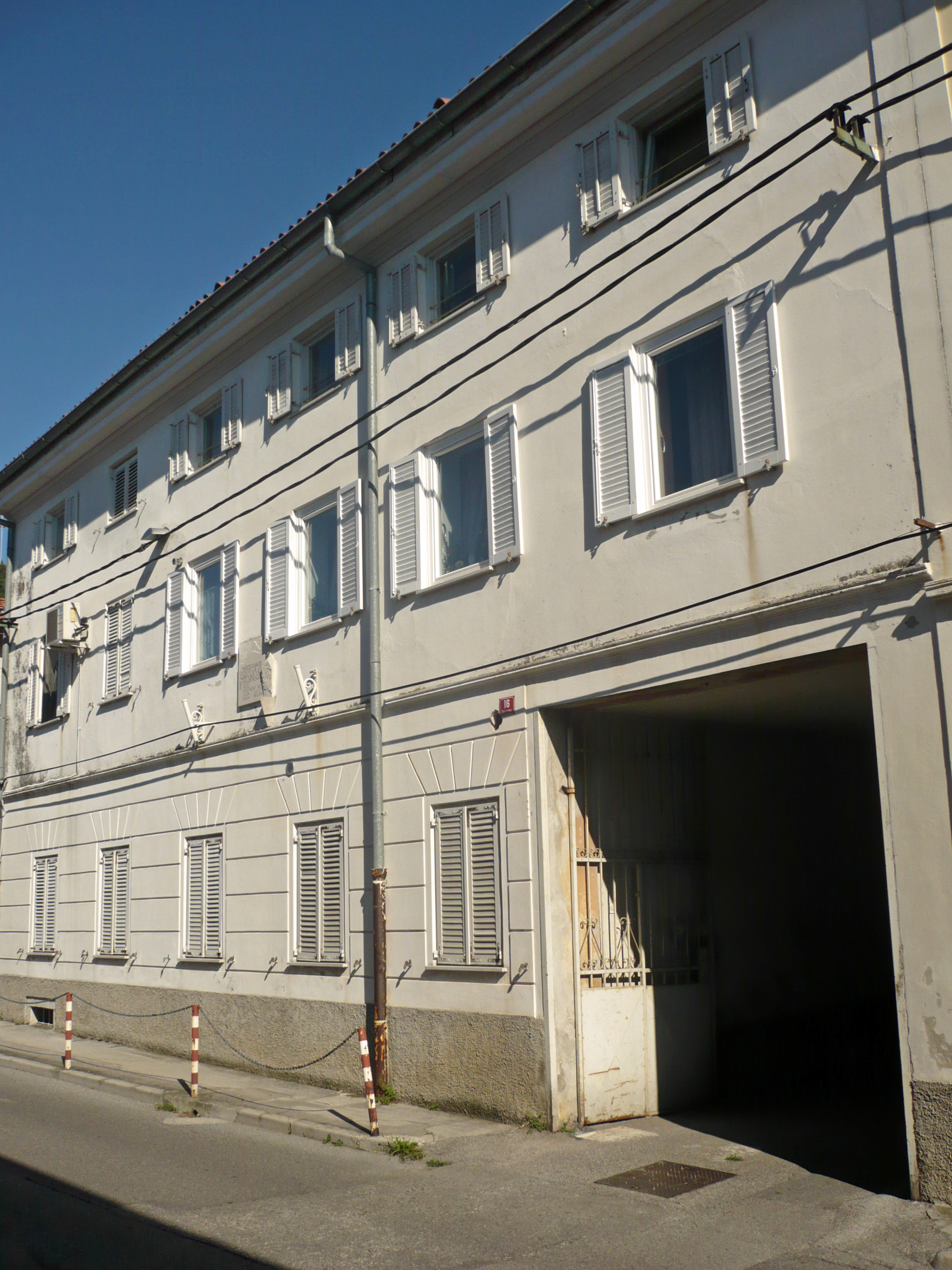
Solkan. House where the philosopher and mountaineer Klement Jug was born.

People who were born or lived in Solkan include:

- Jure Franko, skier
- Ivo Hvalica, politician (Slovenian Democratic Party)
- Klement Jug, philosopher and mountaineer
- Boris Kalin, sculptor
- Zdenko Kalin, sculptor
- Milan Klemenčič, Slovene puppeteer
- Andrej Komel Sočebran, officer of the Austro-Hungarian Army and creator of Slovenian military terminology
- Branko Marušič, historian
- Fedja Marušič, kayak champion
- Franc Marušič, physician
- Franc Lanko Marušič, linguist
- Ivan Janez Marušič, landscape architect
- Tomaž Marušič, politician (Slovenian People's Party), Minister of Justice (1997–2000)
- Anton Mihelič, neurophysiologist, dean of the Charles University in Prague
- Dušan Pirjevec Ahac, literary historian and philosopher
- Marko Anton Plenčič, pioneer of modern microbiology
- Josip Srebrnič, theologian, bishop of Krk
- Jože Srebrnič, politician, communist leader, member of the Italian Parliament
- Boštjan Vuga, architect
- Lucijan Vuga, mechanic engineer and innovator, author
- Danilo Zavrtanik, scientist and president of the University of Nova Gorica
- Pavel Bone, kayak silver and bronze world championship medal winner 1959 and 1961, producer of kayaks
- Toni Prijon, kayak gold world championship medal winner 1959, inventor of kayak brand Prijon
- Domen Maričič, musician
