= Nova Gorica =

- Town
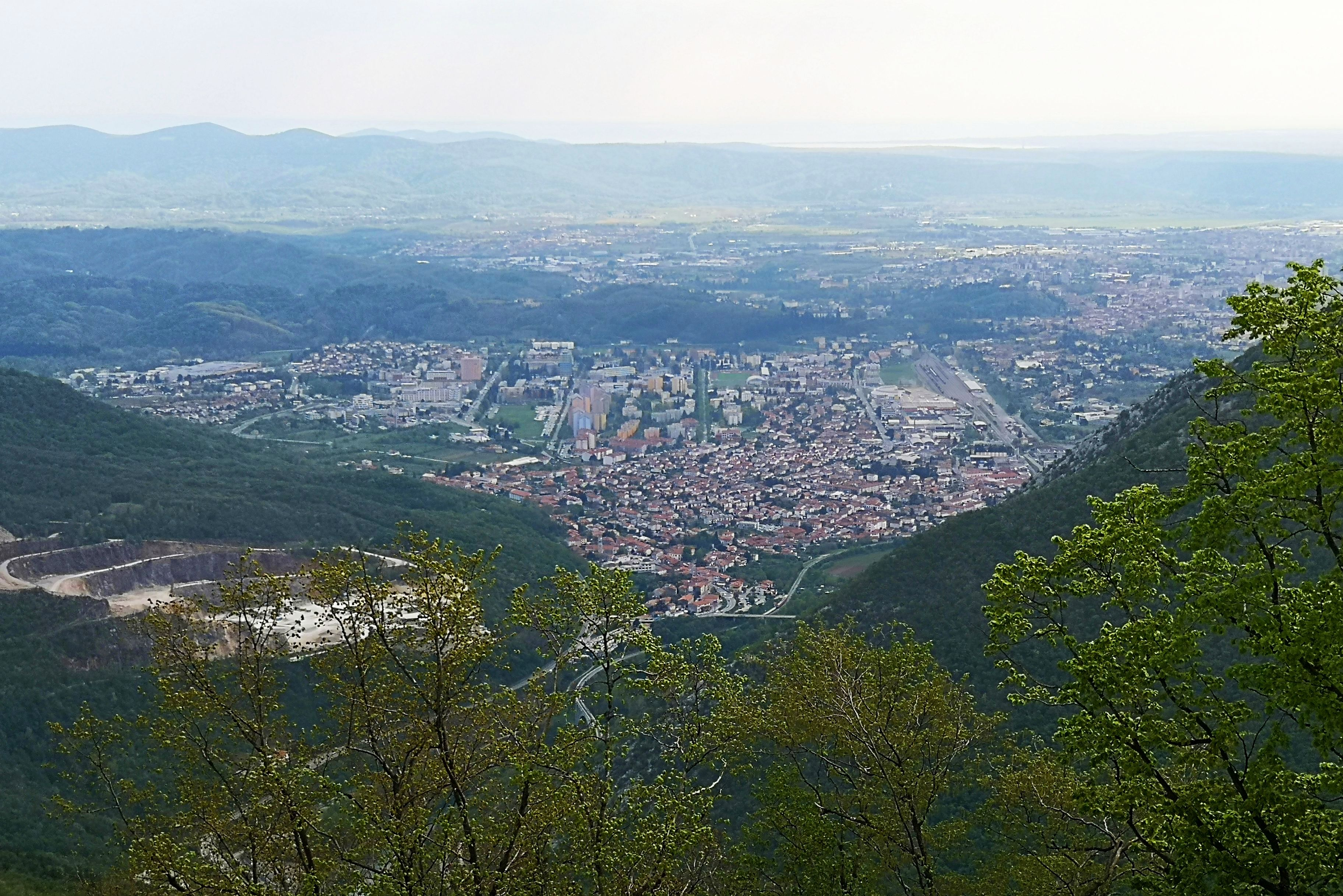
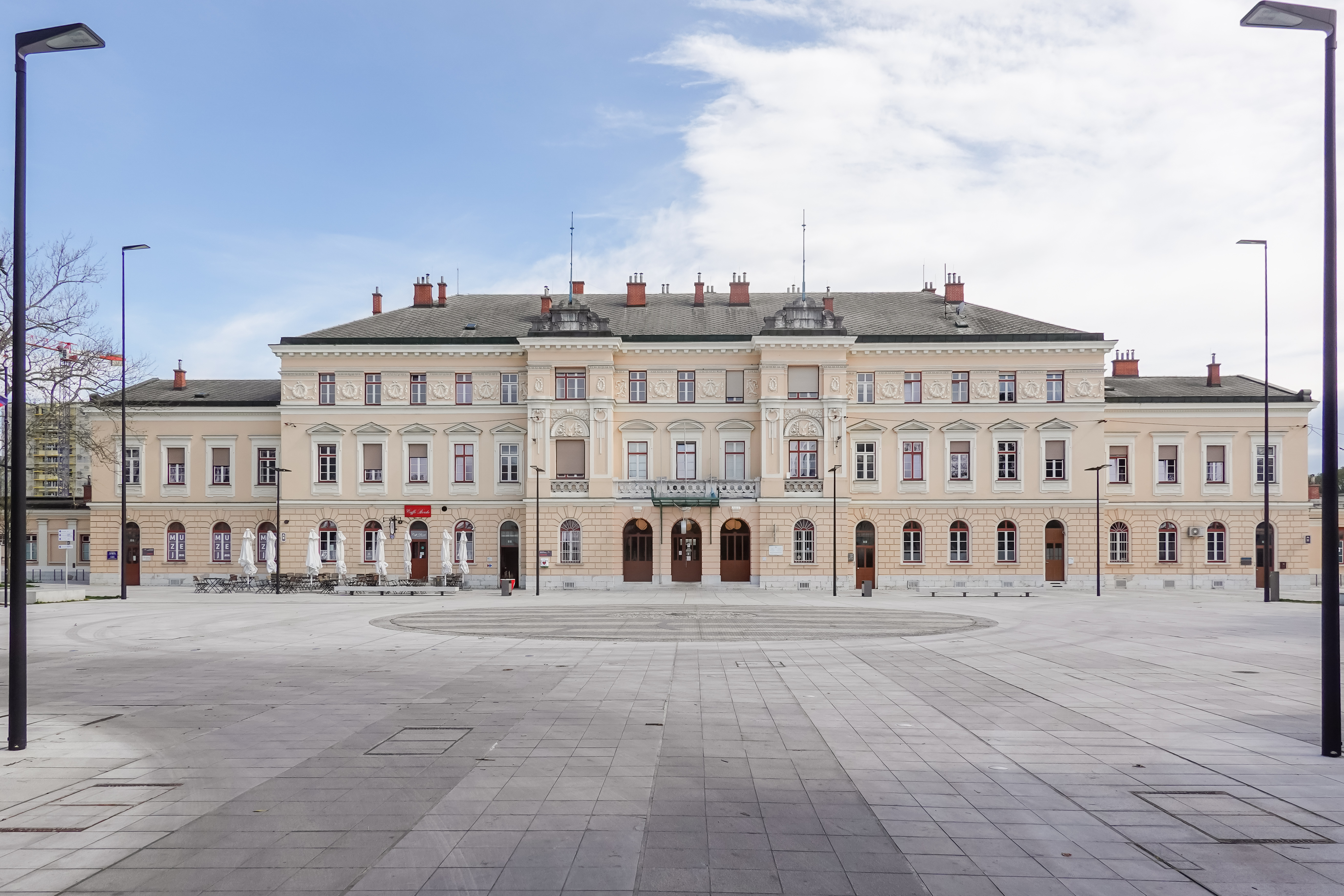
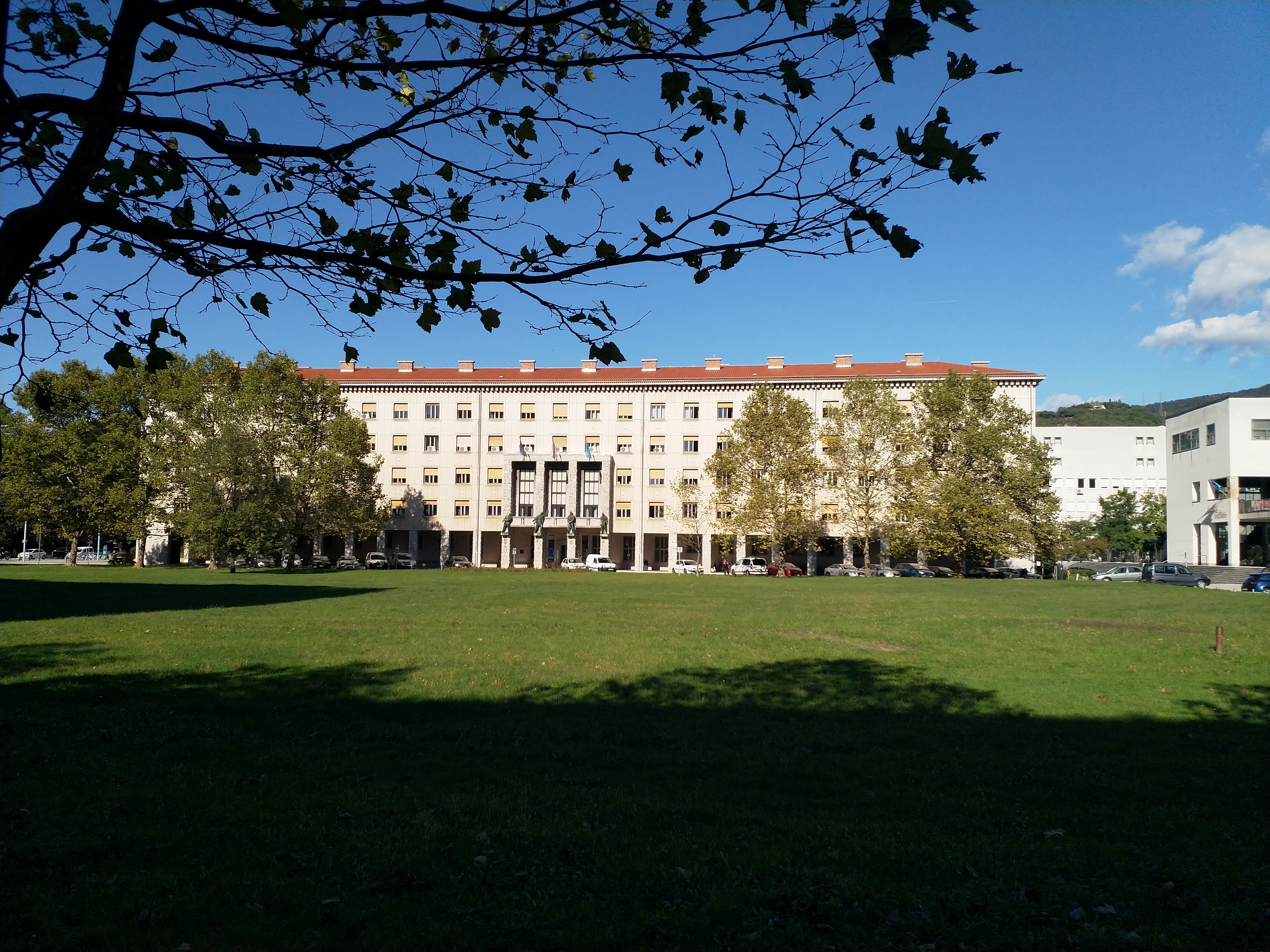
- Overview of Nova Gorica Railway station Town hall

- Flag Coat of arms

- Location in Slovenia
- Coordinates: 45°57′21″N 13°38′36″E
- Country: Slovenia
- Traditional region: Slovenian Littoral
- Statistical region: Gorizia
- Municipality: Nova Gorica

Area
  - Total: 3.49 km^{2} (1.35 sq mi)
- Elevation: 93.4 m (306 ft)

Population (2023)
  - Total: 13,021
  - Density: 3,730/km^{2} (9,660/sq mi)
  - Trans-border urban: 71,753
- Postal code: 5000
- Vehicle registration: GO
- Website: nova-gorica.si

Nova Gorica (pronounced [ˈnɔ̀ːʋa ɡɔˈɾìːtsa]) is a town in western Slovenia, on the border with Italy. It is the seat of the Municipality of Nova Gorica.

Nova Gorica is a planned town, built according to the principles of modernist architecture after 1947, when the Paris Peace Treaty established a new border between Yugoslavia and Italy, leaving nearby Gorizia outside the borders of Yugoslavia and thus cutting off the Soča Valley, the Vipava Valley, the Gorizia Hills and the northwestern Karst Plateau from their traditional regional urban centre. It is the European Capital of Culture in 2025. Since 1948, Nova Gorica has replaced Gorizia as the principal urban center of the Gorizia region (Slovene: Goriška), as the northern part of the Slovenian Littoral has been traditionally called. Since May 2011, Nova Gorica has been joined with Gorizia and Šempeter-Vrtojba in a common trans-border metropolitan zone, administered by a joint administration board.

For 2025 Nova Gorica has won the European Capital of Culture title inviting the neighbouring Gorizia to the bid. The cultural project of two cities on the border attracted worldwide attention and was named by the BBC as Europe's first borderless Capital of Culture where two cities from two countries collaborate under one title European Capital of Culture Nova Gorica - Gorizia GO! 2025.

== Name ==
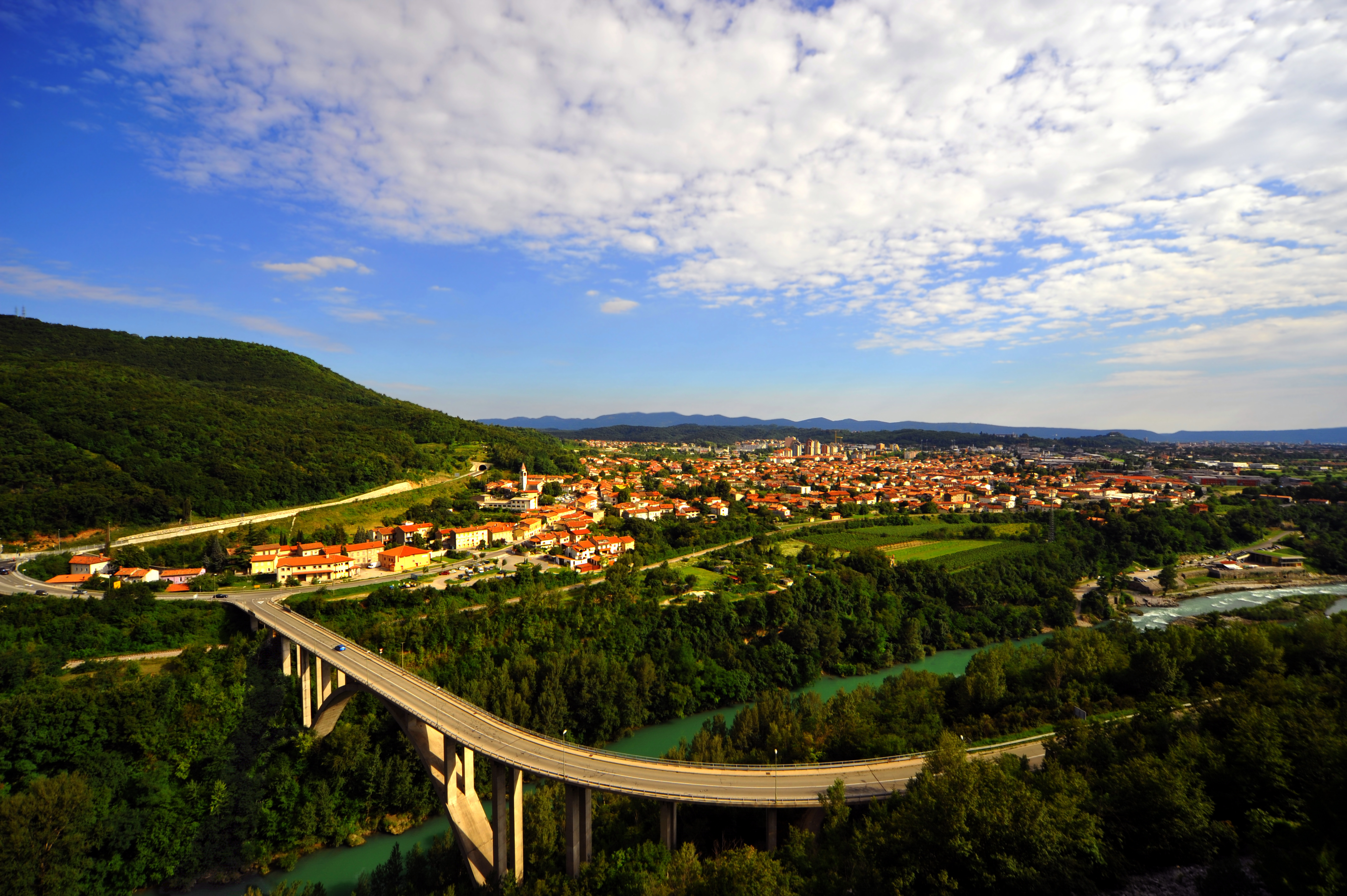
View of Nova Gorica and Solkan

The name Nova Gorica means 'new Gorizia'. The origin of the name Gorizia/Gorica itself is Slavic. The common local term for the town is Gorica (i.e., without the modifier nova 'new'), while residents tend to refer to the neighboring Italian town as Stara Gorica (i.e., 'old Gorizia'). This use is also reflected in Slovenian license plates (GO for Gorica), as well as in the name of the local association football club ND Gorica. The word gorica is a diminutive form of the Slovene common noun gora 'hill'. In archaic Slovene, it also meant 'vineyard'. It is a common toponym in Slovenia and in other areas of Slovene settlement, as well as more generally in areas that have or historically had a Slavic-speaking population.

== History ==
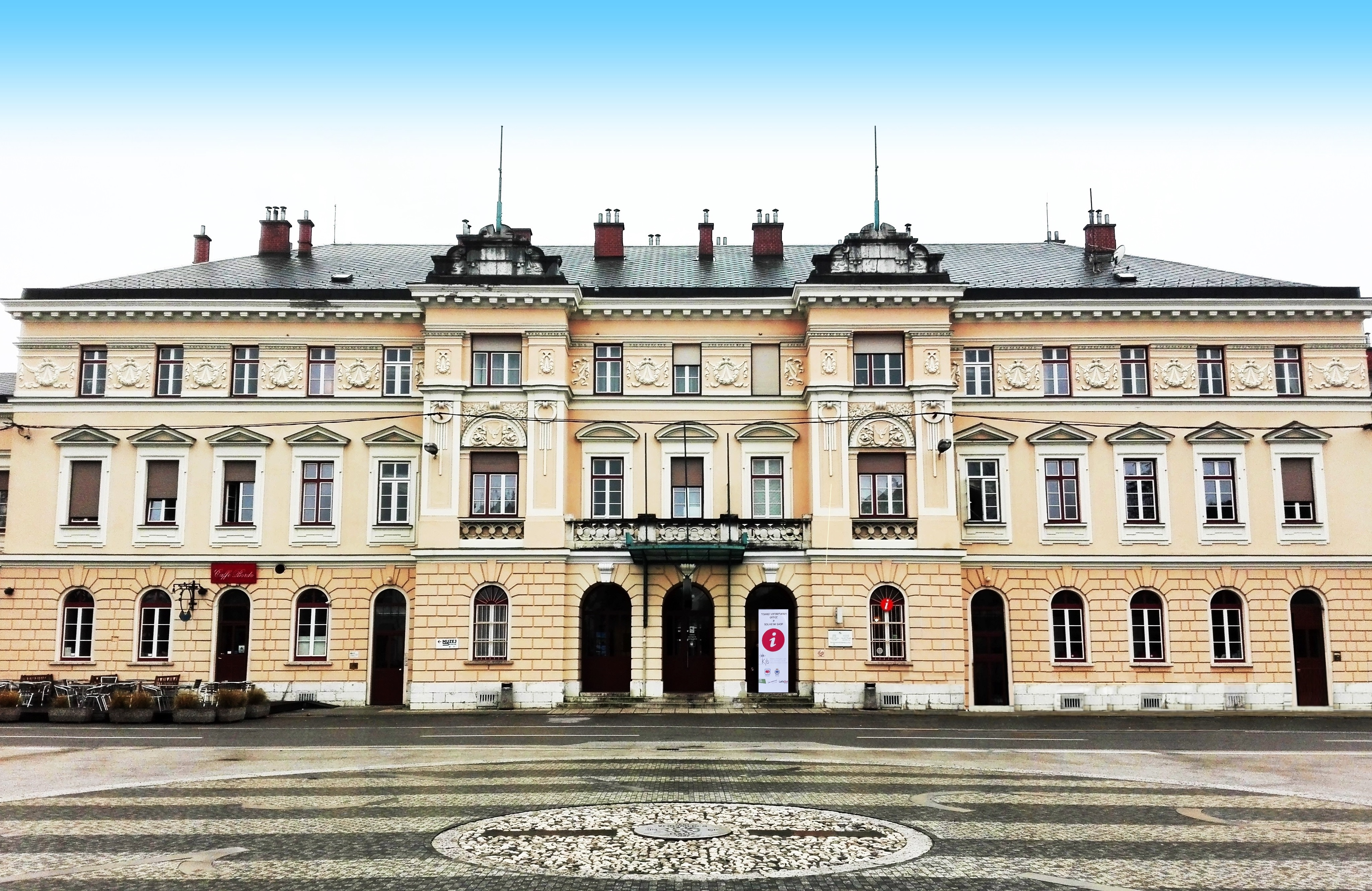
Nova Gorica railway station "Transalpina"

In 1947, following World War II, Italy signed a peace treaty with the Allies, including Socialist Yugoslavia. The treaty transferred most of the Slovene-inhabited areas of the Province of Gorizia to Yugoslavia. The town of Gorizia itself, however, remained under Italian rule. The new border just to the west of the Bohinj Railway cut the city off from its northern and eastern suburbs. Around 40% of the municipality's territory was transferred to Yugoslavia, including the suburbs of Solkan, Šempeter, Kromberk, Rožna Dolina, and Pristava. Together, these areas had a population of around 10,000 (almost exclusively Slovenes, with a tiny Friulian-speaking minority), or around one fifth of the municipality's population. However, they lacked a cohesive structure, and were poorly connected. In order to overcome this problem, the Communist authorities of the Socialist Republic of Slovenia decided to build a new settlement that would connect these suburbs into a new urban space. The new town was called Nova Gorica or "New Gorizia" and the Gorizia Montesanto railway station also named Nova Gorica. The project had the personal backing of Marshal Tito, Yugoslavia's Communist leader. The project was commissioned to the Slovenian architect Edvard Ravnikar, a former pupil of Le Corbusier. The first projects were laid out in winter of 1947, and the construction began at the beginning of the following year.

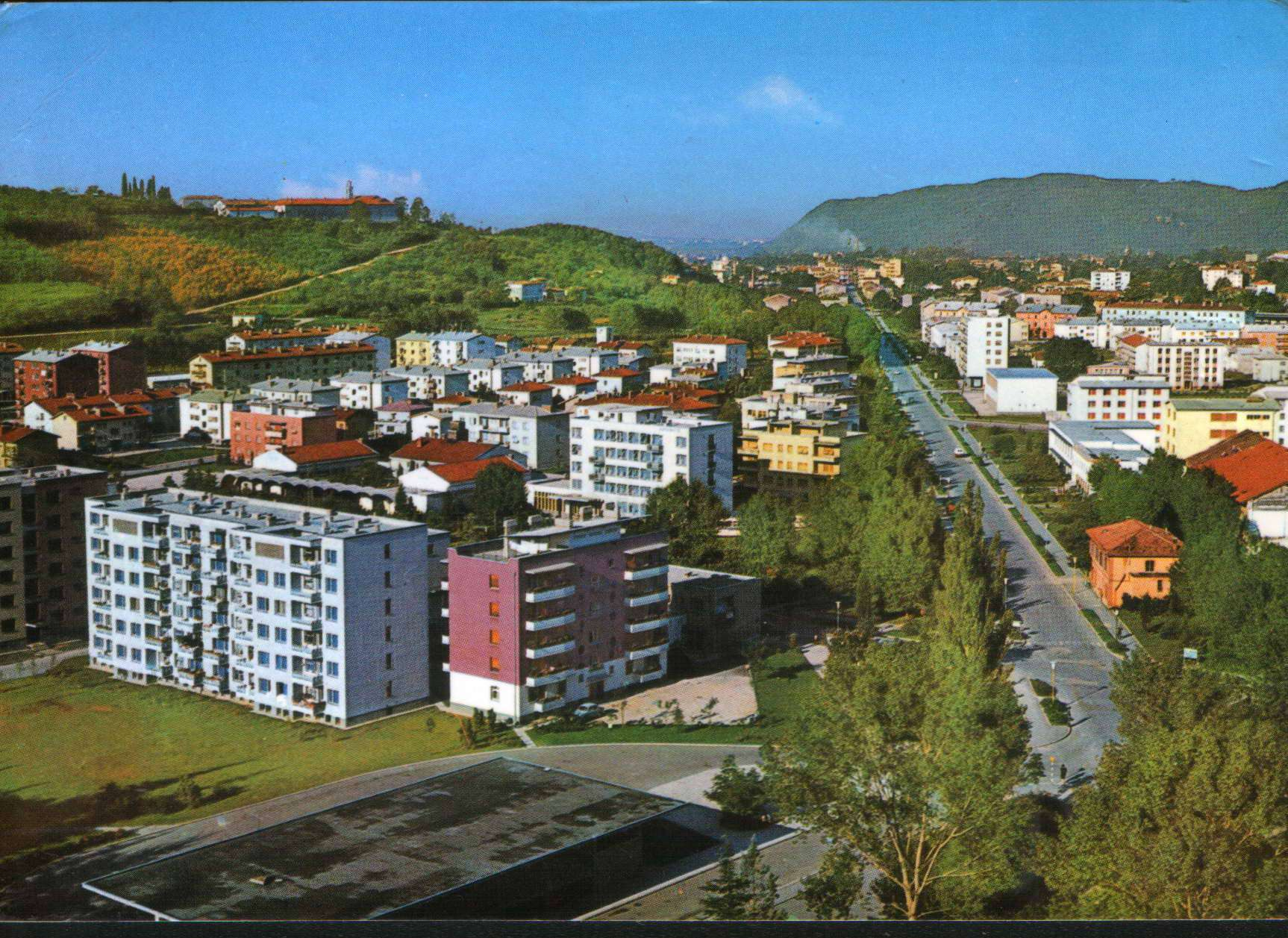
1969 postcard of Nova Gorica

The city was formally established as an urban municipality in 1952, incorporating the older settlements of Solkan, Kromberk and Rožna Dolina, which thus became, somewhat reluctantly, suburbs of Nova Gorica. The building of the town continued throughout the 1950s and 1960s, reaching the current extent by the mid-1980s. In the early 1990s, all of the aforementioned older suburbs acquired again the status of independent settlements. This was however a purely symbolic act that only affected the official statistics on population: because of this, Nova Gorica dropped from the list of 10 largest towns in Slovenia. It nevertheless remains the second largest urban conglomeration in western Slovenia, after Koper.

== Climate ==
Climate data for Nova Gorica, 1991–2020 normals, extremes 1951–2020
Month	Jan	Feb	Mar	Apr	May	Jun	Jul	Aug	Sep	Oct	Nov	Dec	Year
Record high °C (°F)	19 (66)	22.4 (72.3)	26.5 (79.7)	30.4 (86.7)	33.2 (91.8)	36.4 (97.5)	38.3 (100.9)	38.9 (102.0)	33.9 (93.0)	29.5 (85.1)	24.7 (76.5)	17.9 (64.2)	38.9 (102.0)
Mean daily maximum °C (°F)	8.4 (47.1)	10.0 (50.0)	14.1 (57.4)	18.2 (64.8)	22.8 (73.0)	26.9 (80.4)	29.4 (84.9)	29.5 (85.1)	24.1 (75.4)	18.8 (65.8)	13.4 (56.1)	9.2 (48.6)	18.7 (65.7)
Daily mean °C (°F)	3.8 (38.8)	4.9 (40.8)	8.6 (47.5)	12.6 (54.7)	17.1 (62.8)	21.1 (70.0)	23.2 (73.8)	22.8 (73.0)	17.9 (64.2)	13.2 (55.8)	8.9 (48.0)	4.8 (40.6)	13.2 (55.8)
Mean daily minimum °C (°F)	0.5 (32.9)	0.9 (33.6)	4.1 (39.4)	7.6 (45.7)	11.7 (53.1)	15.4 (59.7)	17.2 (63.0)	17.2 (63.0)	13.3 (55.9)	9.4 (48.9)	5.5 (41.9)	1.5 (34.7)	8.7 (47.7)
Record low °C (°F)	−13.2 (8.2)	−15.2 (4.6)	−9.1 (15.6)	−4.4 (24.1)	1 (34)	5.5 (41.9)	7.6 (45.7)	6.5 (43.7)	2.5 (36.5)	−3.4 (25.9)	−7.3 (18.9)	−10.7 (12.7)	−15.2 (4.6)
Average precipitation mm (inches)	93 (3.7)	89 (3.5)	90 (3.5)	97 (3.8)	130 (5.1)	135 (5.3)	116 (4.6)	114 (4.5)	179 (7.0)	166 (6.5)	199 (7.8)	142 (5.6)	1,550 (60.9)
Average snowfall cm (inches)	2 (0.8)	1 (0.4)	0.1 (0.0)	0 (0)	0 (0)	0 (0)	0 (0)	0 (0)	0 (0)	0 (0)	0.1 (0.0)	2 (0.8)	5.2 (2)
Average extreme snow depth cm (inches)	0.1 (0.0)	0.1 (0.0)	0 (0)	0 (0)	0 (0)	0 (0)	0 (0)	0 (0)	0 (0)	0 (0)	0 (0)	0.2 (0.1)	0.2 (0.1)
Average precipitation days (≥ 0.1 mm)	10	9	9	13	14	14	13	11	12	13	14	11	143
Average snowy days (≥ 1 cm)	0.4	0.3	0.1	0	0	0	0	0	0	0	0.1	0.3	1.2
Source: Slovenian Environment Agency (ARSO)

== Culture and education ==
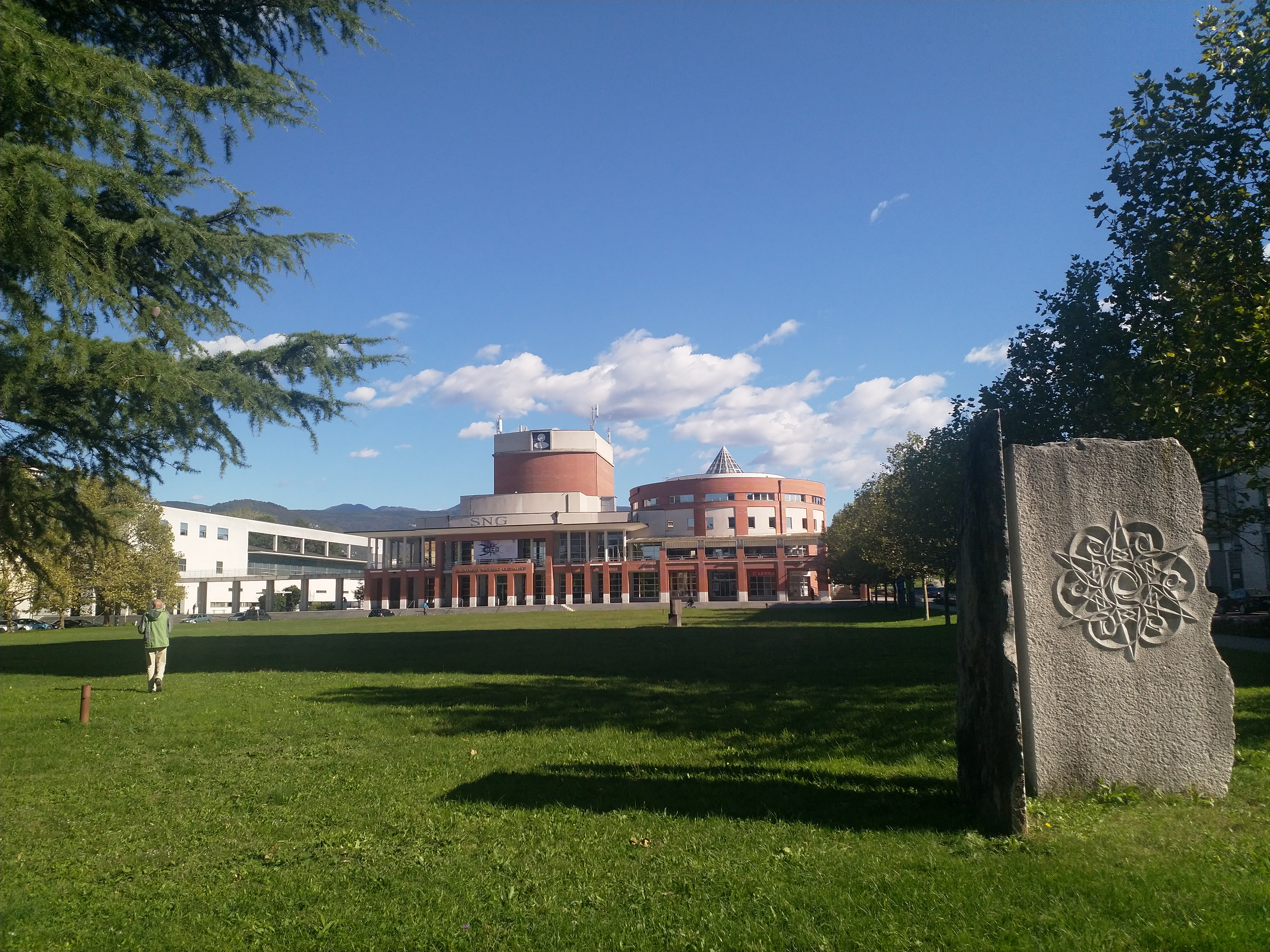
Slovenian National Theater, Nova Gorica

Nova Gorica hosts one of the three national theatres in Slovenia. The Goriška Museum is also located in the town's Kromberk district, hosted in Kromberk Castle.

The University of Nova Gorica is located in the suburb of Rožna Dolina. The Nova Gorica Grammar School, located in the city centre, is one of the most renowned high schools in Slovenia.

The cultural magazine Razpotja is published in Nova Gorica.

Nova Gorica and Gorizia won their joint bid to be designated as European Capital of Culture in 2025; the other city selected for that year is Chemnitz, Germany.

== Kostanjevica Hill ==
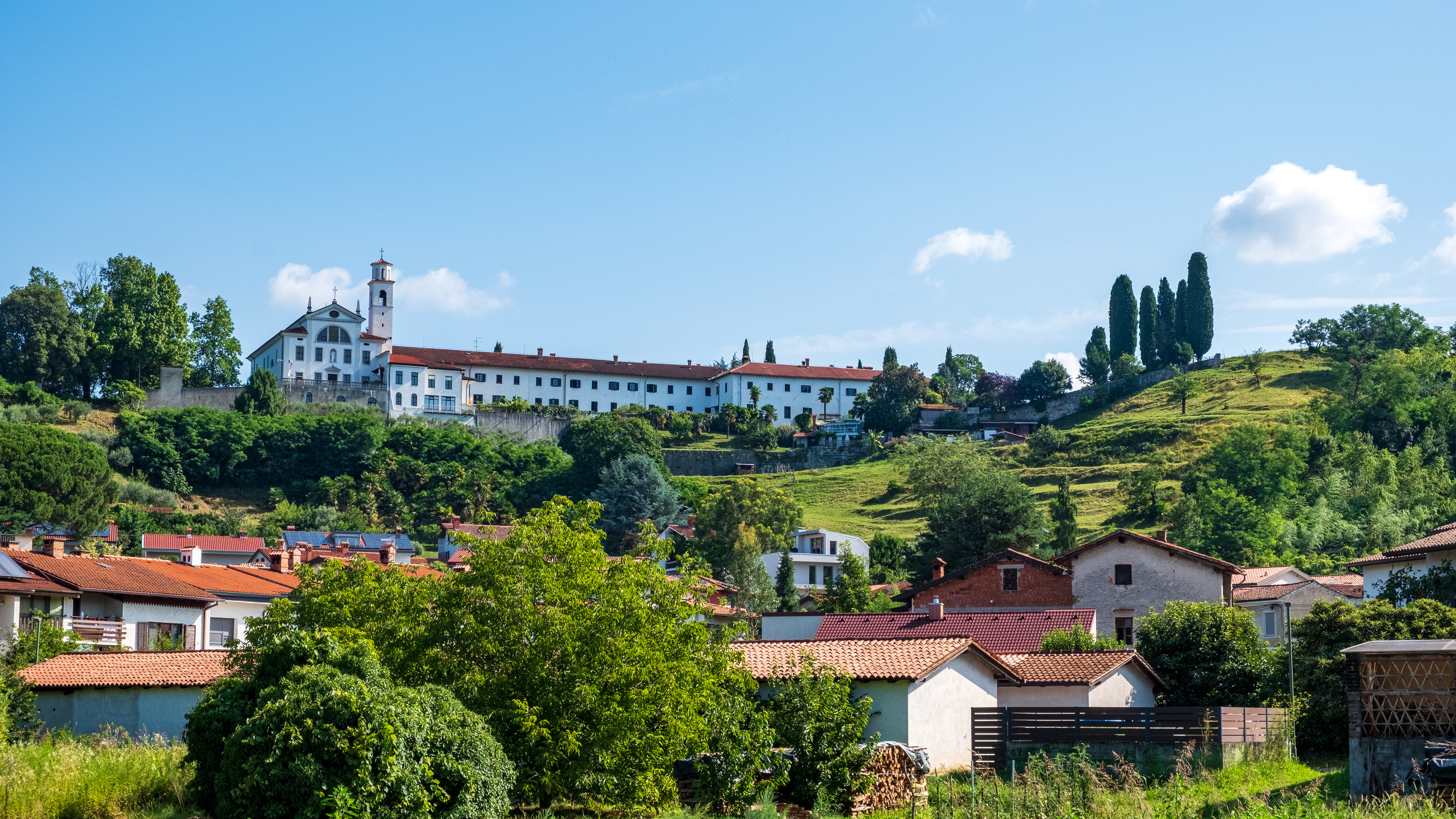
Kostanjevica Monastery

To the south of the town stands Kostanjevica Hill, home to the Church of the Annunciation of Our Lady and a 17th-century Franciscan monastery with rich treasures from the past. The last members of the Bourbons, the French royal family, are buried in a crypt beneath the church (Charles X himself, and members of his family and entourage including his son Louis-Antoine de France, and his grandson Henri d'Artois, nephew of Louis (neither Louis-Antoine nor Henri ever reigned as kings)). He fled France following the revolution in 1830, finding refuge in Gorizia, and eventually died there. Also buried there is Pierre Louis Jean Casimir de Blacas, a Bourbon nobleman who also died in exile (in 1839).

== Sveta Gora ==
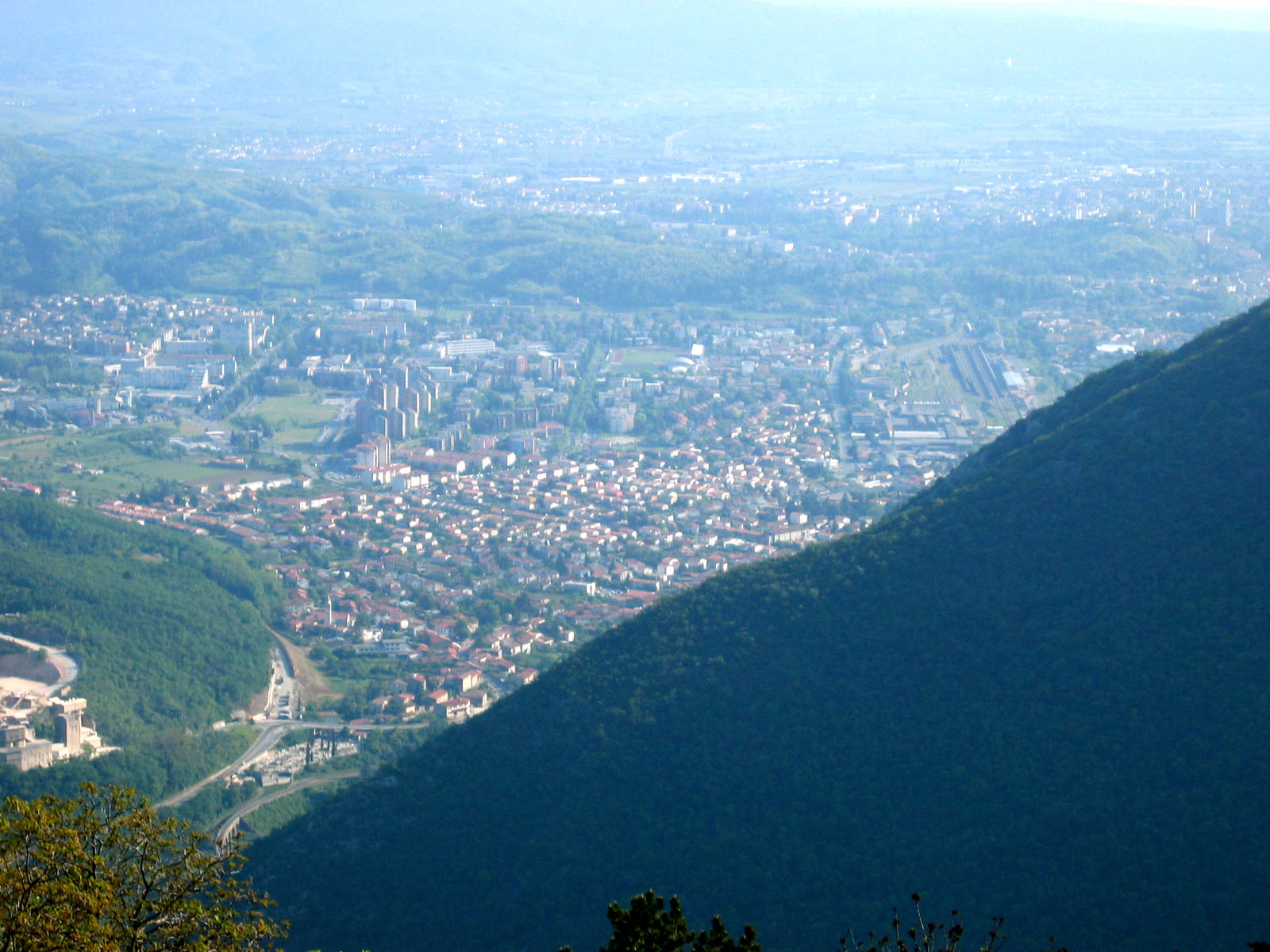
Nova Gorica viewed from Sveta Gora

Opposite Kostanjevica Hill, north of the town is the settlement of Sveta Gora with Holy Mount (Slovene: Sveta gora) a 682-meter (2,238 ft) peak that has attracted pilgrims for 450 years. The view from there is exceptional, and on a clear day visitors can see as far as Istria, Venice, the Dolomites, and the Kamnik and Julian Alps. The mountain top is home to a magnificent basilica, where concerts are occasionally held, a Franciscan monastery, and a museum of the Battles of the Isonzo.

== People ==
=== Arts and sciences ===
- Diego de Brea, theatre director
- Dean Komel, philosopher
- Mirt Komel, philosopher and author
- Branko Marušič, historian
- Maja Novak, writer
- Dušan Pirjevec Ahac, philosopher and literary critic (born in Solkan, now part of Nova Gorica)
- Katja Perat, poet and essayist
- Uroš Seljak, physicist, cosmologist
- Mitja Velikonja, sociologist
- Erika Vouk, poet
- Danilo Zavrtanik, physicist and scholar
- Marko Peljhan, artist
- Jatun Risba, artist
- Kaja Antlej, VR/AR Museum Heritage and Space Artist
- Jan Trstenjak, pioneer in procedural generation

=== Politics and public service ===
- Robert Golob, current Prime Minister of Slovenia
- Borut Pahor, politician, former president of Slovenia
- Zvonko Fišer, former state general prosecutor of Slovenia
- Tomaž Marušič, politician, former minister of justice of Slovenia (1998–2000)
- Vlasta Nussdorfer, child psychologist, former Slovenian ombudsmann
- Senko Pličanič, lawyer and politician, former minister of justice of Slovenia
- Majda Širca, film critic and politician, minister of culture of Slovenia (2008–2011)
- Patricija Šulin, politician, member of the European Parliament
- Samuel Žbogar, politician and diplomat, former minister of foreign affairs of Slovenia
- Samo Turel, politician and mayor of Nova Gorica

=== Sports ===
- Jernej Abramič, slalom canoer
- Jure Franko, ski champion
- Kris Jogan, football player
- Aleš Kokot, football player
- Uroš Kodelja, slalom canoer
- Jan Močnik, basketball player
- Matej Mugerli, road bicycle player
- Jani Šturm, football player
- Eva Mori, volleyball player

=== Show business ===
- Igor Vidmar, rock musician and journalist
- Iztok Mlakar, singer-songwriter and actor
- Aljoša Buha, rock musician

=== Other ===
- Jana Krivec, chess woman grandmaster
- Vojteh Ravnikar, architect
- David Tasić, journalist, political prisoner (JBTZ trial), and publisher

== Twin towns – sister cities ==
Nova Gorica is twinned with:

- Aleksandrovac, Serbia
- Klagenfurt, Austria
- Otočac, Croatia
- San Vendemiano, Italy
- Oghuz, Azerbaijan

== See also ==
- University of Nova Gorica
- Europe Square
- European Capital of Culture Nova Gorica Gorizia - GO!2025
