= Nova Gorica Gymnasium =

- Slovene: Gimnazija Nova Gorica

Location
- Delpinova 9 Nova Gorica; Slovenia; 45°57′25″N 13°38′44″E

Information
- Type: Public gymnasium school
- Established: September 1947; 79 years ago
- Head of school: Andrej Šušmelj
- Age range: 15-19
- Website: Gimnazija Nova Gorica

Nova Gorica Gymnasium (Slovene: Gimnazija Nova Gorica) is a gymnasium, a coeducational secondary school, located in Nova Gorica, western Slovenia. The school is for students aged between 15 and 19. It has been certified as one of the top European Parliament Ambassador Schools in the country.

== History ==
It was established after the annexation of the Slovenian Littoral to the Yugoslavia in September 1947. It was initially located in the nearby town of Šempeter pri Gorici. In 1952, it was transferred to a suburb of the town of Nova Gorica, and in 1960 to the current location in the very centre of the town.

== Notable alumni ==
Many prominent people have attended the Nova Gorica Gymnasium since its founding. Among them were:

- Rajko Bratož, historian
- Kostja Gatnik, illustrator
- Robert Golob, politician and businessman
- Dean Komel, philosopher
- Jana Krivec, chess grandmaster
- Branko Marušič, historian
- Tomaž Marušič, lawyer and politician, Minister of Justice of Slovenia (1997-2000)
- Tomaž Mastnak, sociologist, political scientist and columnist
- Iztok Mlakar, actor, singer and songwriter
- Katja Perat, poet
- Borut Pahor, politician, current President of Slovenia
- Senko Pličanič, lawyer and politician, current Slovenian Minister of Justice and Administration
- Vojteh Ravnikar, architect
- Uroš Seljak, cosmologist, a professor of physics at University of California, Berkeley
- Dušan Šinigoj, politician, Prime Minister of the Socialist Republic of Slovenia (1984-1990)
- Mitja Velikonja, sociologist and cultural anthropologist
- Igor Vidmar, rock musician
- Boštjan Vuga, architect
- Saša Vuga, writer
- Danilo Zavrtanik, physicist
- Samuel Žbogar, diplomat and politician, Minister of Foreign Affairs of Slovenia (2008-2012)
- Pavel Zgaga, pedagogue and politician, Minister of Education of Slovenia (1999-2000)

== Notable professors ==
- Marija Rus (1951/1980)
