= Boris Kalin =

Slovenian sculptor (1905–1975)

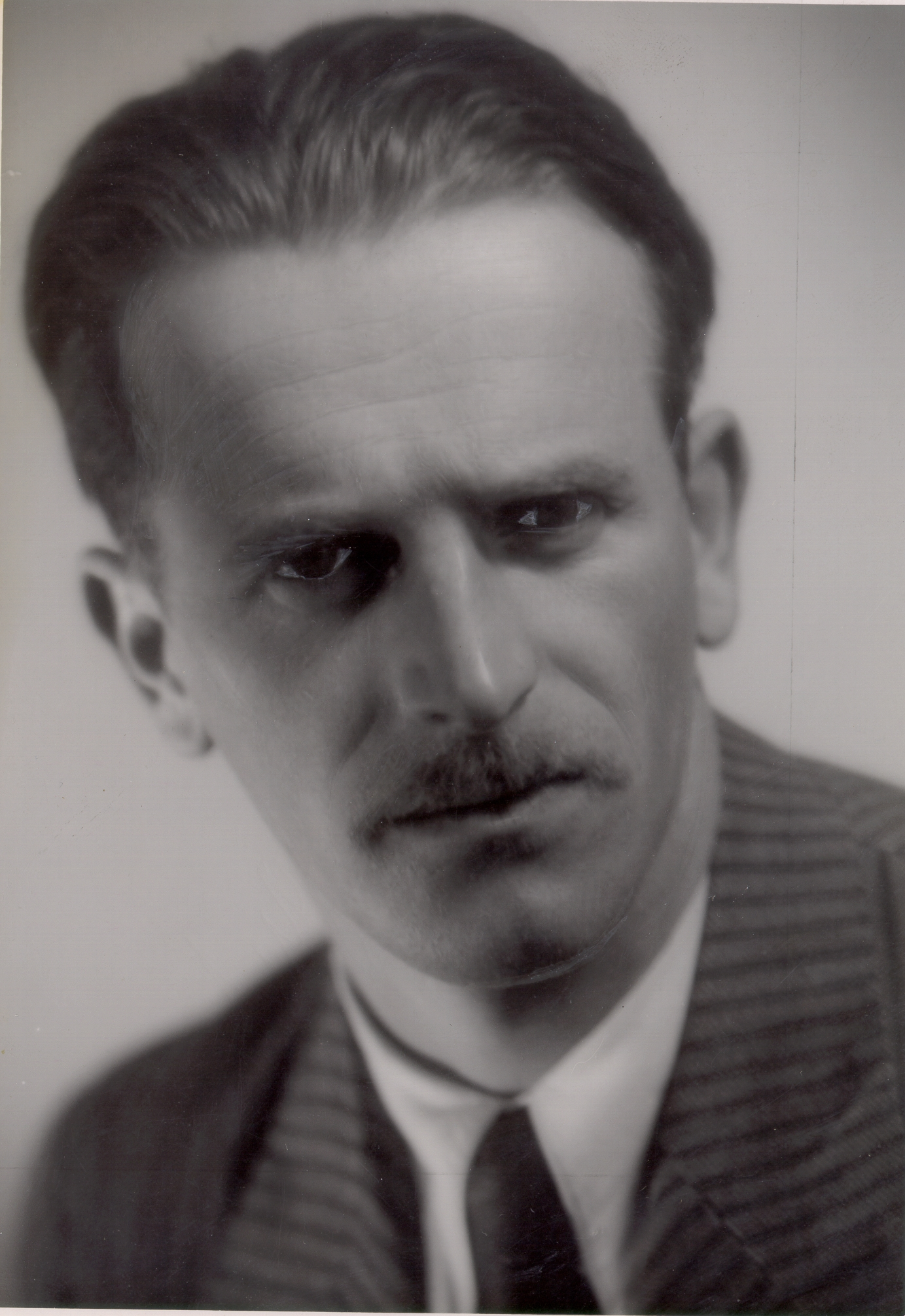
- Born: 24 June 1905; Solkan, Gorizia and Gradisca, Austria-Hungary
- Died: 22 May 1975 (aged 69); Ljubljana, Slovenia, Yugoslavia
- Education: Academy of Fine Arts in Zagreb
- Known for: sculpture
- Notable work: Fifteen-year-old Girl, A Portrait of Marshal Tito, Monument to the People's Liberation War
- Movement: realism, idealism
- Awards: Prešeren Award; 1947 Fifteen-year-old Girl; 1948; A Portrait of Marshal Tito; 1950; Monument to the People's Liberation War

Boris Kalin (24 June 1905 – 22 May 1975) was a Slovene sculptor. He mainly created classical figures, public monuments, and nudes. Some of his sculptures are kept at Brdo Castle as part of its collection of modern Slovene art.

== Biography ==
Kalin was born in Solkan, which was then a suburb of the Austro-Hungarian town of Gorizia and is now part of Nova Gorica, Slovenia. He attended the technical secondary school in Ljubljana and continued his studies between 1924 and 1929 at the Zagreb Academy of Fine Arts with the professors Rudolf Valdec, Frano Kršinić, Ivo Kredić, and Ivan Meštrović. From 1945 to 1970, Kalin taught sculpture at the Academy of Fine Arts in Ljubljana; he was also its dean for two terms. He taught many younger colleagues that became prominent European artists. Kalin was one of the few Slovene sculptors to master stone carving. In 1953 he became a full member of the Slovenian Academy of Sciences and Arts. He died in Ljubljana. His younger brother Zdenko was also a prominent sculptor.

== Work ==
For his work he was bestowed with the Prešeren Award three times: in 1947 for his statue Fifteen-Year-Old Girl (Petnajstletna), said to represent his daughter, in 1948 for his statue Portrait of Marshal Tito (Portret Maršala Tita), and in 1950 for his Monument to the People's Liberation War (Spomenik narodnoosvobodilni borbi) in Vrhnika.
