= Razpotja =

Slovenian cultural magazine

- Editor-in-chief: Luka Lisjak Gabrijelčič
- Former editors: Martin Hergouth, Miha Kosovel
- Categories: Cultural magazine
- Frequency: Quarterly
- Circulation: 1.500
- Publisher: Društvo humanistov Goriške
- First issue: 2010; 16 years ago
- Country: Slovenia
- Based in: Nova Gorica and Ljubljana
- Language: Slovene
- Website: Razpotja

Razpotja (Slovene for Crossroads) is a Slovenian quarterly cultural magazine, part of the Eurozine network of European magazines.

== History and profile ==
Razpotja was founded in the autumn of 2010 in Nova Gorica, Slovenia, by a local association of students and young scholars of humanities and social sciences, with the aim to open a new space for public discussion. It has four issues per year, providing a platform for informed non-academic debate, mostly written from the perspective of the millennial generation. Each issue is dedicated to a topic of broad public interest, approached in the form of longreads articulating different standpoints. These articles are usually selected from responses to an open call for papers, thus enabling the participation of emergent authors.

The magazine includes sections of contemporary debates and cultural phenomena in Europe and North America. It is renowned for its long interviews with public intellectuals, including Garry Kasparov, Timothy Snyder, Jordan Peterson, Michael Freeden, Dipesh Chakrabarty, Stuart Ewen, Padraic Kenney, Thomas Hylland Eriksen, Jean-Luc Marion, Pieter M. Judson, Simona Škrabec, Jan-Werner Müller, Vinko Globokar, Emilio Gentile, Richard Bosworth, Marci Shore, etc.

Since 2014, Razpotja has been collaborating with young Slovenian illustrators, who contribute illustrations and visual essays relating to the main topic of the issue.

As of 2024, the editor-in-chief is Luka Lisjak Gabrijelčič, and the members of the editorial board are Igor Harb, Martin Hergouth, Peter Jerman, Blaž Kosovel, Miha Kosovel, Aljoša Kravanja, Katja Pahor, and Maks Valenčič.

== Notable contributors ==
Several notable authors have contributed to Razpotja, including Julián Casanova Ruiz, Manuel Castells, Božidar Debenjak, Jordi Graupera, Drago Jančar, Miljenko Jergović, Tomasz Kamusella, Dean Komel, Mirt Komel, Janko Kos, Ivan Krastev, Geoff Manaugh, Stephen Mulhall, Sofi Oksanen, Vinko Ošlak, Jože Pirjevec, Andrei Pleșu, Boris Podrecca, Peter Pomerantsev, Paul Preston, Alenka Puhar, Mykola Riabchuk, Anton Shekhovtsov, Quentin Skinner, Timothy Snyder, Andrzej Stasiuk, Kirmen Uribe, Vladimir Tismăneanu, Olga Tokarczuk and more than 200 others.

== Issues and topics ==
As of winter 2024, 58 issues of the magazines have been published, which include two double issues and a special edition dedicated to the 70th anniversary of the founding of the town of Nova Gorica (in 2017).

- Politics and Science (Nr. 1, fall of 2010)
- Apathy and Gluttony (Nr. 2, winter of 2010)
- Freedom of Information? (Nr. 3, spring of 2011)
- Left and Right? (Nr. 4, summer of 2011)
- Families (Nr. 5, fall of 2011)
- Consumerism (Nr. 6, winter of 2011)
- Health (Nr. 7, spring of 2012)
- Space (Nr. 8, summer of 2012)
- Oblivion & Economic Crisis (double issue, Nr. 9/10, fall–winter of 2012)
- Europe (Nr. 11, spring of 2013)
- Culture War(s) (Nr. 12, summer of 2013)
- Kafka and Kierkegaard (Nr. 13, fall of 2013)
- Nature (Nr. 14, winter of 2013)
- Slovene Language (Nr. 15, spring of 2014)
- Nietzsche (Nr. 16, summer of 2014)
- Labor/Work (Nr. 17, fall of 2014)
- Sexuality (Nr. 18, winter of 2014)
- Youth (Nr. 19, spring of 2015)
- War and Peace (Nr. 20, summer of 2015)
- Max Fabiani (Nr. 21, fall of 2015)
- Public Interest (Nr. 22, winter of 2015)
- Conspiracy (Nr. 23, spring of 2016)
- Critique (Nr. 24, summer of 2016)
- Hannah Arendt & Sloth and Boredom (double issue, Nr. 25/26, fall–winter of 2016)
- Rhetorics (Nr. 27, spring of 2017)
- Fragile Europe (Nr. 28, summer of 2017)
- Nova Gorica (special issue on the 70th anniversary of the town of Nova Gorica, Nr. 29, fall of 2017)
- Catalan Crisis (Nr. 30, winter of 2017)
- Artificial Intelligence (Nr. 31, spring of 2018)
- Identity Politics (Nr. 32, summer of 2018)
- Marx and Cankar (Nr. 33, fall of 2018)
- Expert Knowledge (Nr. 34, winter of 2018)
- Sound (Nr. 35, spring of 2019)
- Cities (Nr. 36, summer of 2019)
- Intimacy (Nr. 37, fall of 2019)
- Trash (Nr. 38, winter of 2019)
- Hierarchies (Nr. 39, spring of 2020)
- Hegel (Nr. 40, summer of 2020)
- Void (Nr. 41, fall of 2020)
- Flesh (Nr. 42, winter of 2020)
- Image (Nr. 43, spring of 2021)
- Nation State (Nr. 44, summer of 2021)
- Mediterranean (Nr. 45, fall of 2021)
- The Universe (Nr. 46, winter of 2021)
- Trust (Nr. 47, spring of 2022)
- Slavs (Nr. 48, summer of 2022)
- Fascism (Nr. 49, fall of 2022)
- Code (Nr. 50, winter of 2022)
- Ritual (Nr. 51, spring of 2023)
- Traffic (Nr. 52, summer of 2023)
- Liberalism (Nr. 53, fall of 2023)
- Middle Ages (Nr. 54 winter of 2023)
- Play/Game (Nr. 55, spring of 2024)
- Civil Wars (Nr. 56, summer of 2024)
- Old Age (Nr. 57, fall of 2024)
- Borders (Nr. 58, winter of 2024)

== See also ==
- List of magazines in Slovenia
- Culture of Slovenia
