= Maja Novak =

Slovenian writer, translator and journalist

- Born: 23 April 1960 (age 66); Jesenice, Socialist Federal Republic of Yugoslavia (Socialist Republic of Slovenia)
- Occupations: Writer; translator; journalist
- Writing career
- Notable work: Mačja kuga (The Feline Plague)

Maja Novak (born 23 April 1960) is a Slovenian writer, translator and journalist.

Born in the industrial town of Jesenice, she grew up in Nova Gorica, a planned town on the Yugoslav-Italian border. She studied business law at the University of Ljubljana and worked as business secretary in Jordan before settling in Ljubljana, where she works as a journalist.

She started publishing short stories in the early 1990s. She has published four novels: Izza kongresa, ali umor v teritorialnih vodah (Behind the Congress, or Murder in Territorial Waters, 1993), Cimre (Roommates, 1995), Kafarnaum (Capernaum, 1998), and Mačja kuga (The Feline Plague, 2000), as well as the collection of short prose Zverinjad (Wild Beasts, 1996) and three books for children.

Her novel Mačja kuga (The Feline Plague) has been praised as a literary masterpiece.

She has translated authors from French (such as Gaston Leroux), Italian (such as Alessandro Baricco, Susanna Tamaro, and Giacomo Casanova), Serbian (such as Vladimir Arsenijević), and English (such as Helen Fielding, Alain de Botton, and Terry Pratchett).

She writes a regular op-ed column in the weekly left-wing current affairs magazine Mladina.
