= Tomaž Marušič =

Slovenian lawyer and politician

Tomaž Marušič (19 May 1932 – 16 February 2011) was a Slovenian lawyer and politician.

He was born in Gorizia, Italy. His father, Franc Marušič was a renowned local physician and a staunch Slovene patriot and antifascist. During his childhood, the family moved to the suburb of Solkan, which was included in the Socialist Federal Republic of Yugoslavia in 1947.

Marušič studied at the Nova Gorica Grammar School. He graduated from law at the University of Ljubljana and worked as a lawyer in Nova Gorica and Koper. During the Slovenian Spring (1988–1990), he joined the newly formed Slovene People's Party. In 1993, he was elected by the City Council of Nova Gorica as the first non-Communist mayor of the town, but lost the elections the following year against Črtomir Špacapan of the Liberal Democracy of Slovenia. From February 1997 until June 2000, Marušič served as Minister for Justice in the coalition government led by Janez Drnovšek.

He is the brother of the renowned historian Branko Marušič and of the Landscape Architect Ivan Janez Marušič.

Political offices
Preceded by Meta Zupančič	Minister of Justice of Slovenia; 27 February 1997 – 7 June 2000	Succeeded by Barbara Brezigar
