= GO! 2025 =

Initiative in Slovenia and Italy

- Location: Nova Gorica, Slovenia; Gorizia, Italy
- Website: https://www.go2025.eu

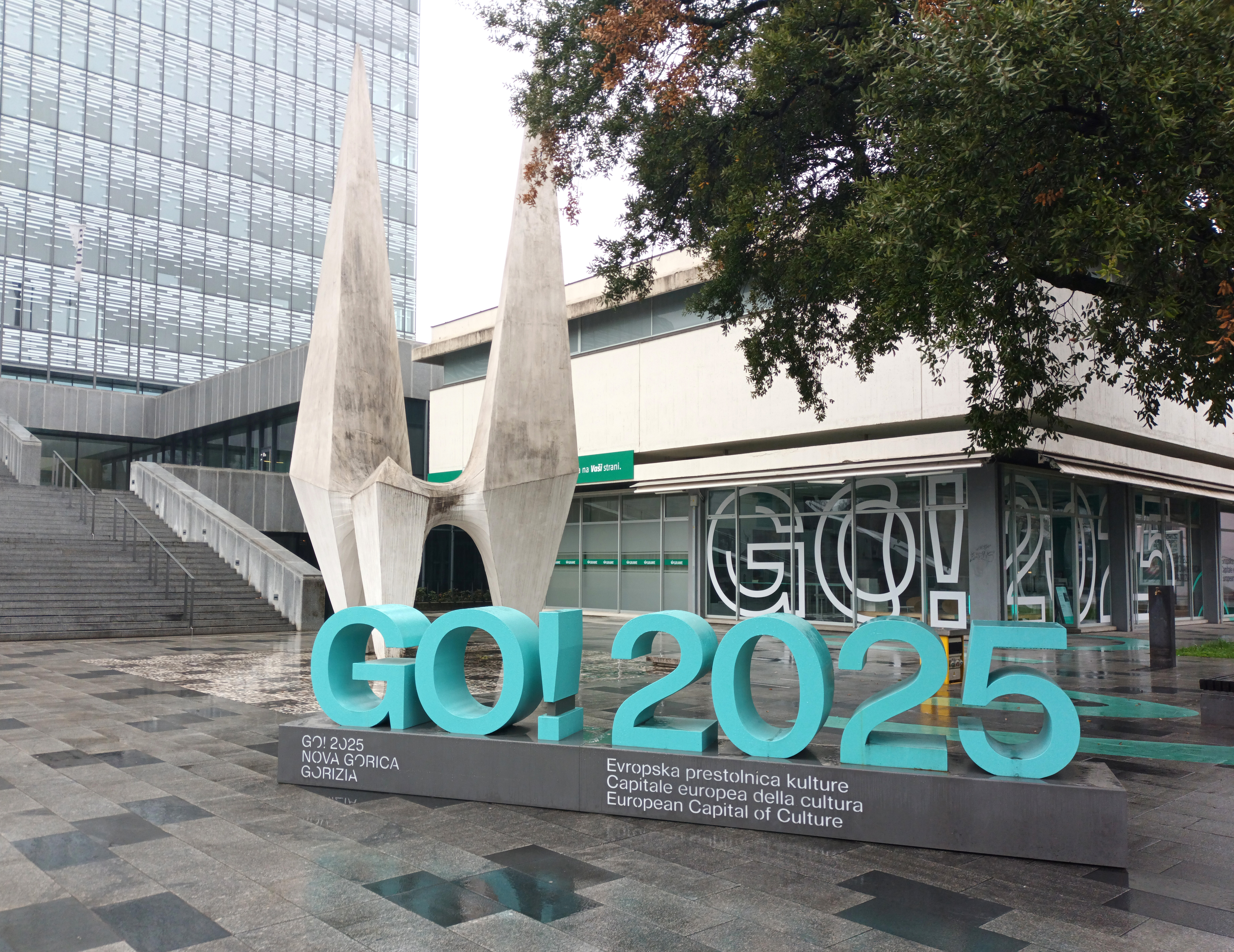
GO! 2025

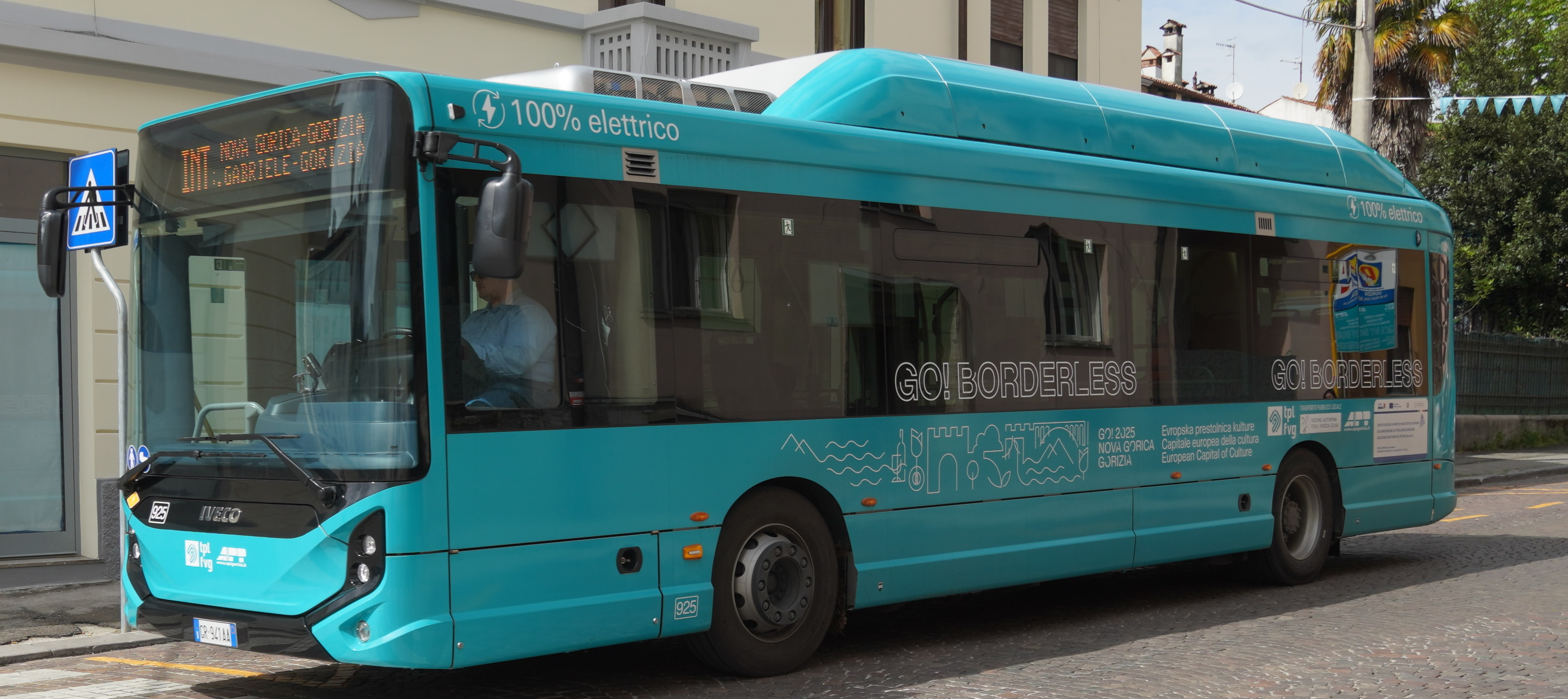
Cross-border buses for European Capital of Culture Nova Gorica–Gorizia GO!2025

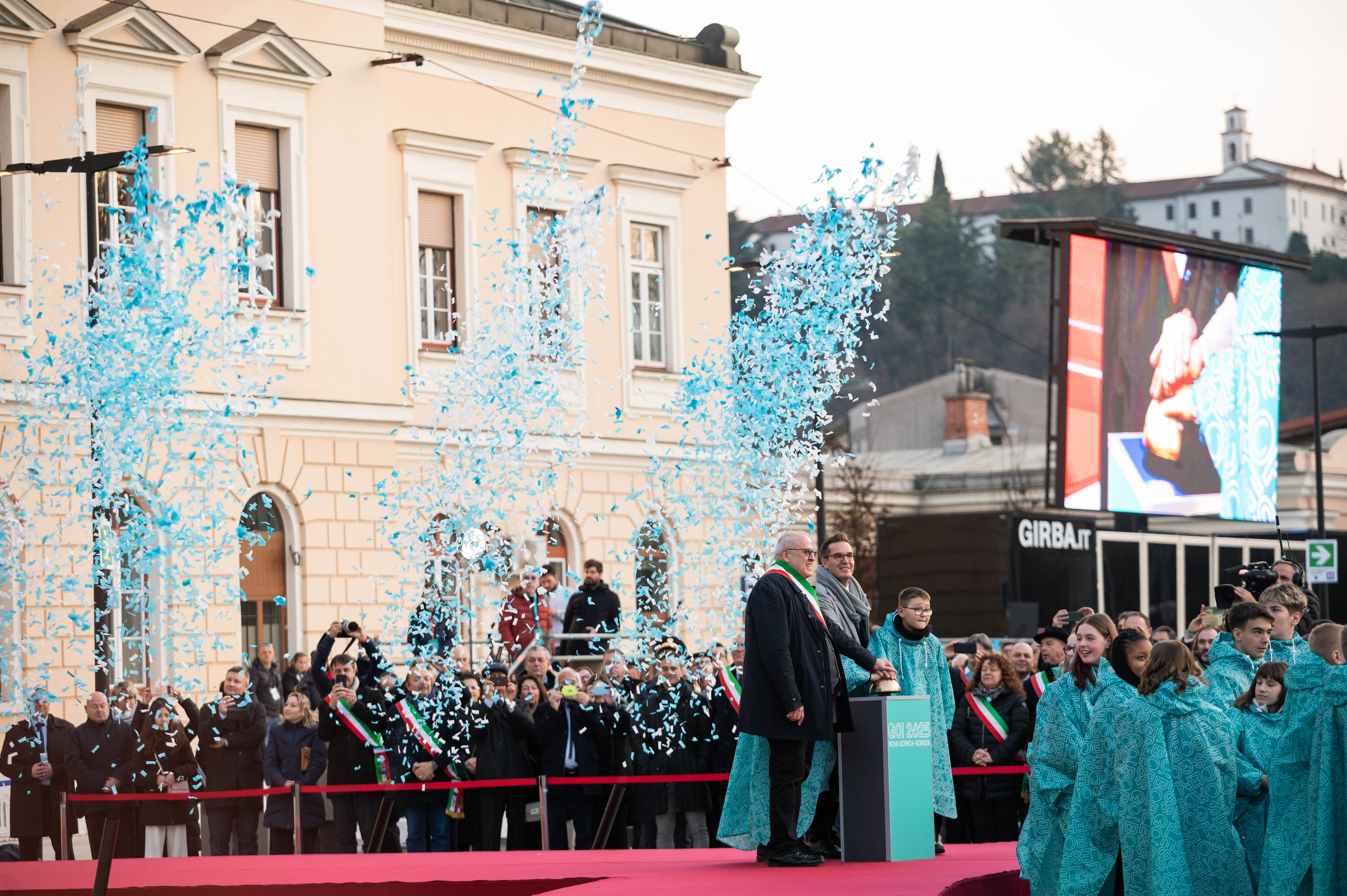
Opening ceremony on 8 February 2025

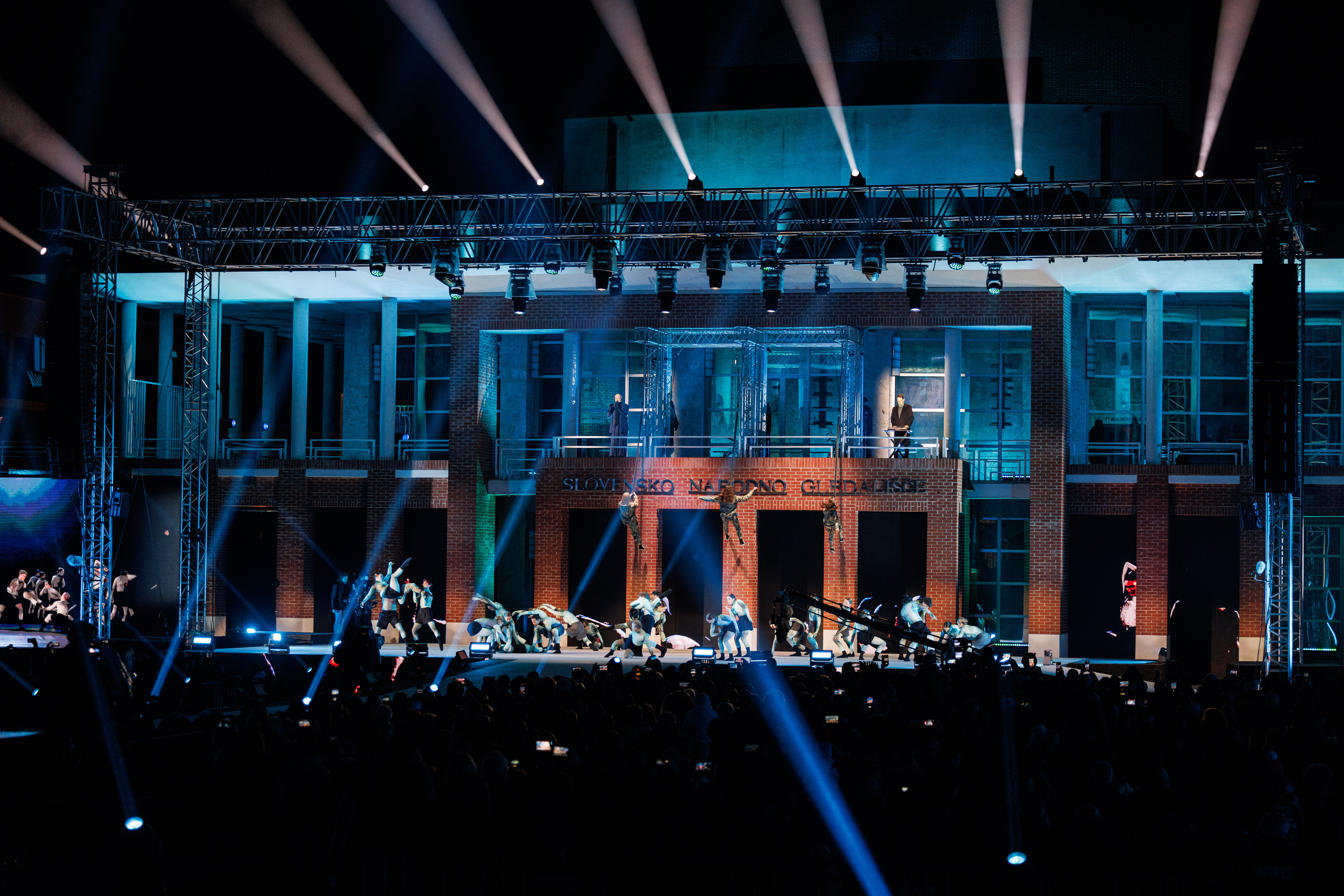
Opening ceremony on 8 February 2025

European Capital of Culture GO! 2025 (also GO! 2025) is a project of the European Commission, that was conducted for the first time in the history by two cities in two countries under one title, whereby Slovenian Nova Gorica has invited neighbouring Italian Gorizia. It is the first cross-border European Capital of Culture in the history of the initiative. The project is held under the slogan GO! Borderless.

== Background ==
The European Capital of Culture initiative was established in 1985 with the aim of promoting cultural diversity and the development of European cities through culture. Nova Gorica Slovenia's Youngest City and it's neighbouring Gorizia were selected for the year 2025 following the decision of an expert panel appointed by the Council of the European Union. The official opening of the project took place on 8 February 2025 at five venues across both cities, coinciding with the Slovenian cultural holiday, and was attended by around 50,000 people. The project also brought numerous investments to the cities, including infrastructure renovations and the creation of new spaces for creativity, social interaction, and tourism.

== History ==
The authors of the bid book, led by Neda Rusjan Bric, drew inspiration from historical events along the border between Slovenia and Italy, an area historically marked by both world wars and the geopolitical interests of major powers. With Slovenia joining the European Union in 2004 and the Schengen Area in 2007, border controls were gradually abolished, although other forms of division remained. The slogan "GO! Borderless" was therefore directed toward the long-term effort of overcoming these boundaries.

== Concept ==
The project is based on cross-border cooperation and the creation of a shared cultural space. The ECoC's goals according to the European Commission:

- development of an authentic cultural programme
- strengthening cross-border cooperation between Slovenia and Italy
- development of cultural and creative industries
- sustainable development
- increasing cultural tourism.

== Programme ==
During the title year, the GO! 2025 programme included numerous cultural events such as exhibitions, festivals, concerts, and theatre performances. both within the official programme and accompanying events embracing wider programme from culture, sports, sustainability and cultural tourism. More than 1,600 events were held on both sides of the border, attracting over 1.5 million visitors in total.

== Organisation ==
The project is implemented by the public institution GO! 2025 – European Capital of Culture, Nova Gorica. in cooperation with other public institutions and non-governmental organisations, as well as the European Grouping of Territorial Cooperation EGTC GO (Slovene: EZTS GO).

== Leadership ==
The director of the GO! 2025 public institution is Mija Lorbek, programme director is Stojan Pelko while the artistic advisor and lead author of the bid book is Neda Rusjan Bric. The governance structure also includes the institution's council chaired by Marjan Zahar and professional and operational services.

== International response ==
The project attracted attention from numerous European institutions, media outlets (such as BBC, ARTE TV, Nikkei, etc.), and professional journals. A delegation from the European Parliament expressed support for the project during a visit to the two cities and highlighted its significance for cross-border cooperation and European integration.

== Significance ==
GO! 2025 is the first example of a cross-border European Capital of Culture and is regarded as a symbol of overcoming borders and fostering cooperation in Europe.
