= Branko Marušič =

Slovenian historian (1938–2026)

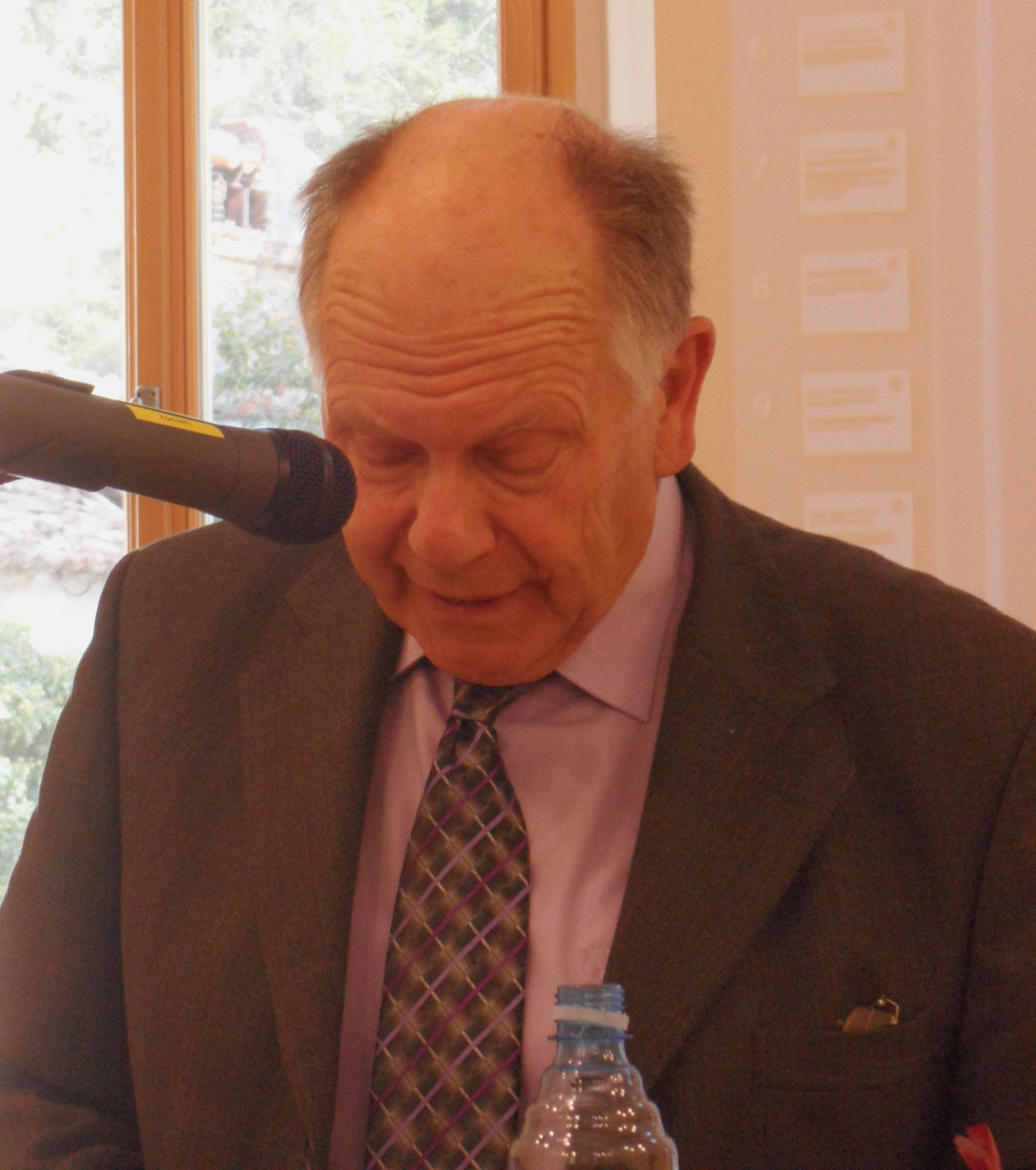
Branko Marušič

Branko Marušič (4 February 1938 – 2 May 2026) was a Slovenian historian.

== Life and career ==
Born to an upper middle class Slovene family in Gorizia, Italy, he moved with the family to the Yugoslav side of the Yugoslav–Italian border in 1947. He had been living in Solkan since. After finishing the Nova Gorica Grammar School, he studied history at the University of Ljubljana.

A specialist on the political history of the 19th century, he wrote many volumes on a variety of topics, focusing on the history of Slovene–Italian border regions of Goriška and Venezia Giulia. He wrote both in Slovene and Italian. He is known for his studies of Slovene–Italian relations in the 19th and 20th century, and has been praised for his contributions in the cultivation of Slovene–Italian cultural and historical dialogue. He was a member of the Slovenian-Italian Cultural-Historical Commission, established by the governments of the two countries to shed light on the historical relationship between the two peoples from 1880 to 1954.

Marušič was later a senior researcher at the Research Centre of the Slovenian Academy of Sciences and Arts.

Marušič died on 2 May 2026, at the age of 88. He was the brother of the politician Tomaž Marušič and of the landscape architect Ivan Janez Marušič.
