= Danilo Zavrtanik =

Slovenian physicist and professor (born 1953)

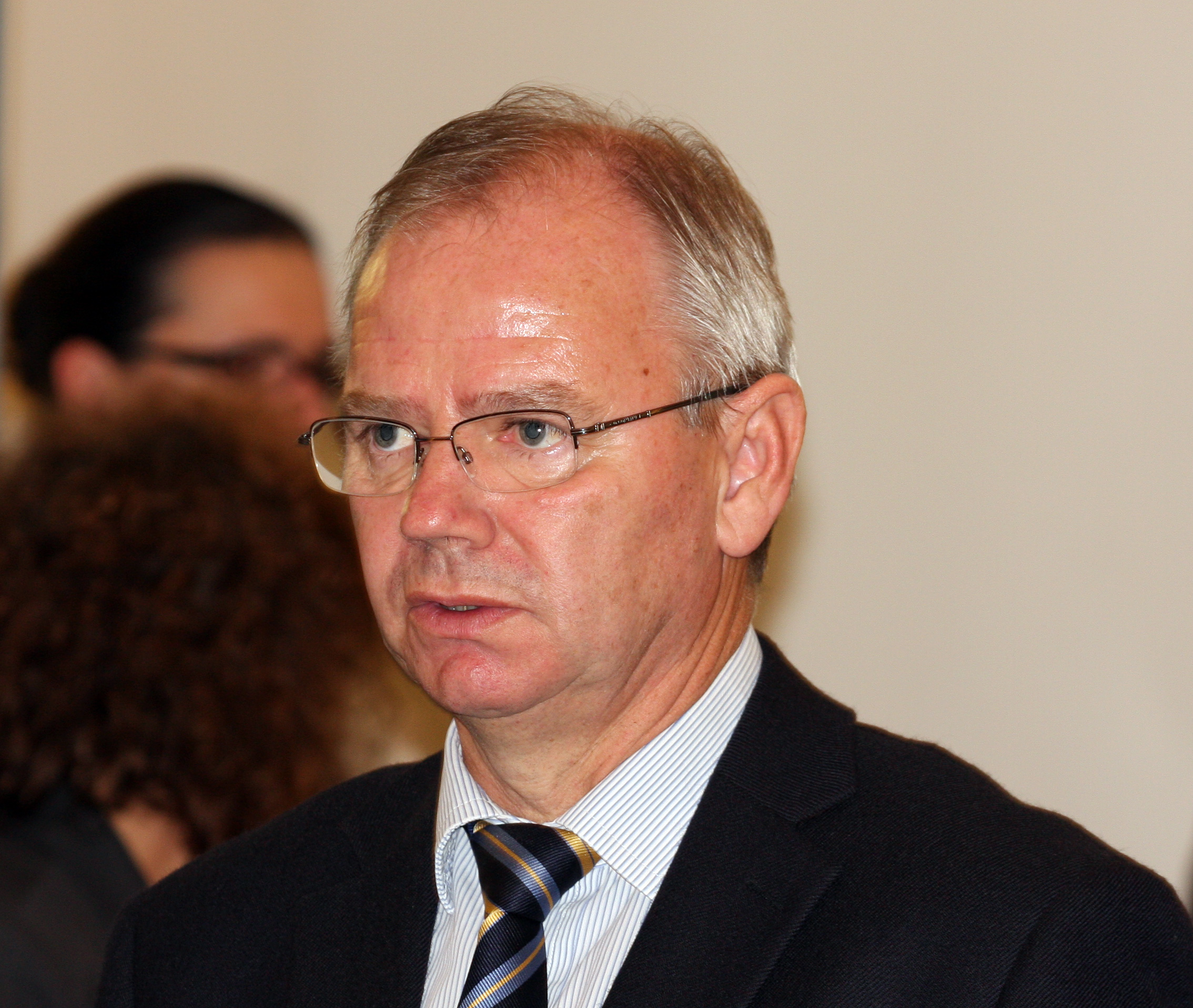
Danilo Zavrtanik in 2011

Danilo Zavrtanik (born 15 August 1953) is a Slovenian physicist and professor.

Born in Nova Gorica, he graduated in 1979 from the Faculty for Natural Sciences and Technology of the University of Ljubljana. In 1987, he obtained his PhD by defending a doctoral dissertation on "Angular distribution analysis of the reaction π^{−}p -> π^{−}π^{+}n". From 2006 he is a full professor of physics at the University of Nova Gorica and the head of the Laboratory for Astroparticle Physics.

Before 1995 he was active in experimental particle physics through international collaborations CPLEAR and DELPHI at CERN, where he was involved in the development of particle detectors, studies of CP, T and CPT violation in the decays of neutral kaons K^{0} and studies of heavy quark decays, W gauge boson decays and Higgs boson searches. Since 1995 he is working in the field of astroparticle physics within the Pierre Auger Collaboration, focusing on studies of cosmic rays with extreme energies. He is a co-author of more than 350 scientific papers and more than 150 conference contributions. He has been a thesis adviser to a number of undergraduate and graduate students at the University of Ljubljana and the University of Nova Gorica.

From 1992 to 1996 he served as director-general of the Jožef Stefan Institute in Ljubljana. In 1995 he initiated the founding the School of Environmental Sciences in Nova Gorica which grew into Nova Gorica Polytechnic and finally into University of Nova Gorica. Since the beginning till 2009 he served as the president of this institution and from 2010 till 2022 as a rector.

Among his many honours and awards the most distinguished are: "Order of Merit (Slovenia)" in 2005 "Ambassador of Science of the Republic of Slovenia" in 1997 and "Zois Award" (highest Slovenian award for scientific achievements) in 2004.
