= Mirt Komel =

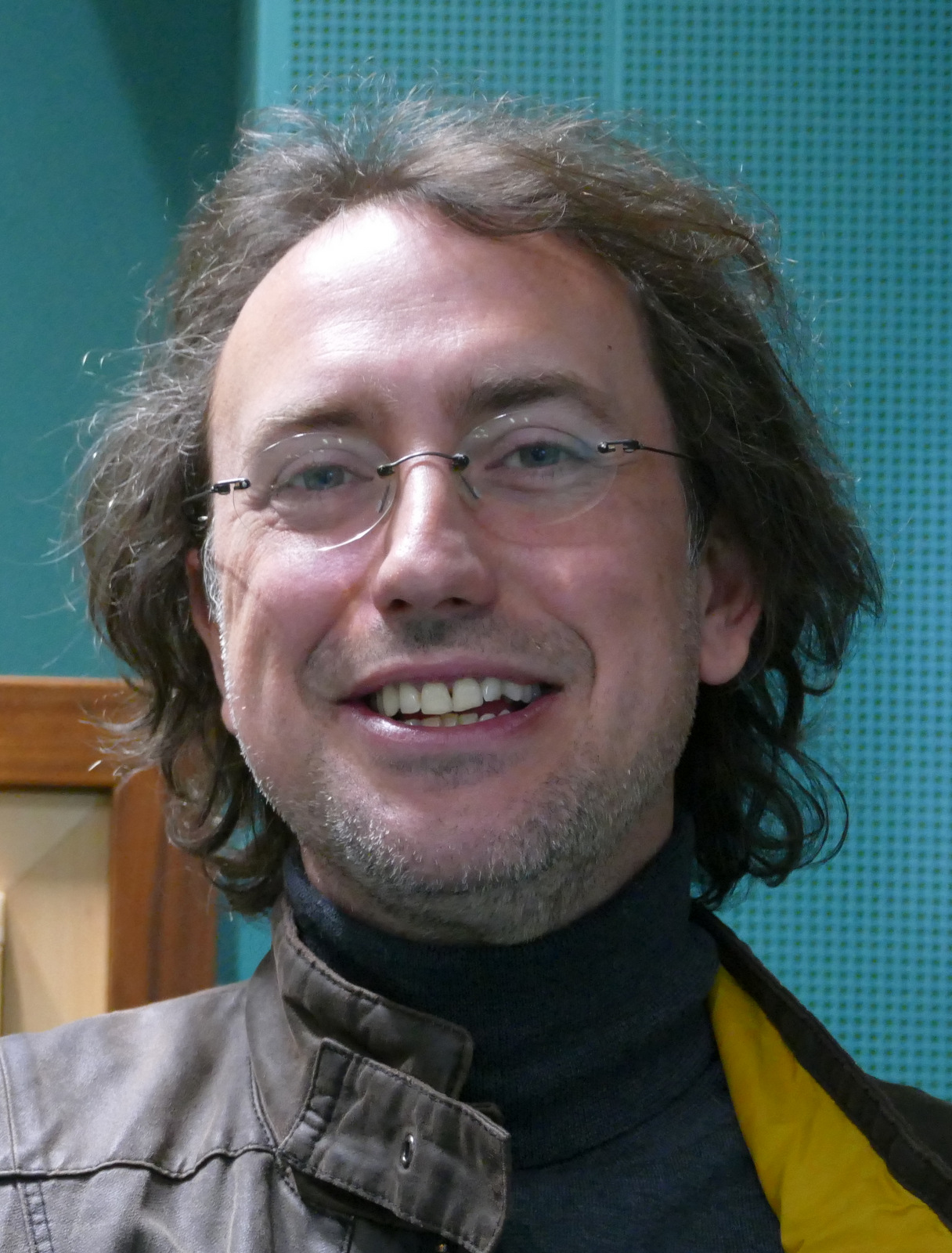
Mirt Komel.jpg

Mirt Komel (born 21 August 1980) is a Slovenian philosopher, novelist, sociologist, playwright, essayist and translator.

Komel is currently employed as assistant professor in philosophy at the University of Ljubljana (Faculty of Social Sciences, Department and Chair of Cultural Studies) and researcher at the Center of Cultural and Religious Studies (University of Ljubljana, Institute for Social Sciences).

He has published numerous scientific texts in political theory, social anthropology, and theoretical psychoanalysis in international and Slovenian scholarly journals (e.g. Problems, Journal for the Critique of Science), as well as several scientific monographs. Three of them (Attempt of a Touch/Poskus nekega dotika, 2008, Discourse and Violence/Diskurz in nasilje, 2012, Socratic Touches/Sokratski dotiki, 2015) hinge on the main axis of his research: an attempt at a philosophical reconceptualization of touch and tactility informed with insights from the contemporary humanities and social sciences.

Komel is also a writer of prose, plays, and essays. His essayistic contributions appear in Mladina, Delo, Mediawatch, and Tribuna.

He is an active participant of many civil initiatives and movements. He is co-founder and active member of the International Hegelian Society Aufhebung. He is also co-founder of the Society of Humanists of Goriška (Društvo humanistov Goriške), co-founder (and vice-president in 2006–2009) of the Youth Club of the Society of Slovenian Writers (Društvo slovenskih pisateljev), co-founder (and member in 2010–2013) of the Likej Association.

== Education ==
Komel attended Nova Gorica High School. In 2005, he received a BA in sociology from the University of Ljubljana with a thesis on the Mythologics of the Social Contract. In 2010, he was awarded a PhD in Philosophy from the University of Ljubljana, having written his dissertation on The Philosophical Aspects of the Relationship between Discourse and Violence (advisors: philosopher Dr. Mladen Dolar, sociologist Dr. Mitja Velikonja, anthropologist Dr. Karmen Šterk). In 2008, he was visiting scholar at the University of Sarajevo (Faculty of Political Science).

== Selected bibliography ==
=== Books ===
- Sokratski dotiki/Socratic touches. Ljubljana: Faculty of Social Sciences Publishers (Skodelica kave), 2015. ISBN 978-961-235-711-5.
- Diskurz in nasilje/Discourse and Violence. Ljubljana: Association for theoretical psychoanalysis (Analecta/Problemi, vol. 50, 7/8), 2012. ISBN 978-961-6376-55-6.
- Twin Peaks in postmodernizem: kava, pita, sova, škrat/Twin Peaks and postmodernism: coffee, pie, owl, -and dwarf. Ljubljana: Slovenska kinoteka (Imago series), 2012. ISBN 978-961-6417-77-8.
- Poskus nekega dotika/Attempt of a Touch. Ljubljana: Faculty of Social Sciences Publishers (Kiosk), 2008. ISBN 978-961-235-332-2.; E-book version. 2011; ISBN 978-961-235-528-9.

=== Editor ===
- Utopije demokracije: zbornik/Utopias of Democracy (Nova Gorica: Čitalnica Babel, Zavod neinstitucionalne kulture Masovna, 2005).
- avne in zasebne vojne/Public and Private Wars (Ljubljana: Časopis za kritiko znanosti, Študentska založba, 2006).
- Post-daytonska Bosna in Hercegovina/Post-Dayton Bosnia and Herzegovina (Ljubljana: Časopis za kritiko znanosti, Študentska založba, 2011).
- Izguba sveta/Loss of the World (Ljubljana: Časopis za kritiko znanosti, Študentska založba, 2012).

=== Essays ===
- Sarajevski dnevnik/The Sarajevo Journal (Ljubljana: Študentska založba, 2009).
- Kahirske kaheksije/Cahirian cahexions (Ljubljana: Kultipraktik, 2011).

=== Plays ===
- Mes(t)ne drame/Carnal Plays (Nova Gorica: Ma-No, 2006).
- Luciferjev padec/The Fall of Lucifer (Nova Gorica: Ma-No, 2008).
