= University of Nova Gorica =

University in Slovenia

- Univerza v Novi Gorici
- Former names: Nova Gorica Polytechnic, School of Environmental Sciences
- Motto: Scientia Vinces
- Motto in English: Knowledge conquers
- Established: 1995; 31 years ago
- Vice-Chancellor: Matjaž Valant, Penka Stateva
- Rector: Boštjan Golob
- Students: 448
- Location: Nova Gorica, Ajdovščina, Vipava, Slovenia; 45°56′32.35″N 13°38′24.75″E
- Website: www.ung.si

University rankings

Regional – Overall
- QS Emerging Europe and Central Asia: 88 (2022)

The University of Nova Gorica, UNG (Slovene: Univerza v Novi Gorici), is the fourth university in Slovenia. It is located in the towns of Nova Gorica, Vipava, and Ajdovščina.

== History ==
The University of Nova Gorica grew out of the School of Environmental Sciences founded in 1995 by the City Municipality of Nova Gorica and the Jožef Stefan Institute. In March 2006, the former Nova Gorica Polytechnic was renamed the University of Nova Gorica. Today the university has 7 schools and 10 research institutes.

== Organization ==
Faculties and schools:

- Graduate school
- School for Viticulture and Enology
- School of Science
- School of Engineering and Management
- School of Environmental Sciences
- School of Humanities
- School of Arts

Research institutes:

- Center for Astrophysics and Cosmology
- Center for Atmospheric Research
- Center for Cognitive Science of Language
- Centre for Information Technologies and Applied Mathematics
- Research Centre for Humanities
- Wine Research Centre
- Laboratory for Environmental and Life Sciences
- Laboratory of Organic Matter Physics
- Laboratory of Quantum Optics
- Materials Research Laboratory
