= Mitja Velikonja =

Slovenian academic

PhD Mitja Velikonja
- Born: 1965; Šempeter pri Gorici, Socialist Republic of Slovenia, SFR Yugoslavia
- Citizenship: Slovenia

Academic work
- Discipline: social science
- Institutions: University of Ljubljana
- Main interests: political ideologies in Central Europe and Balkans, subcultures and urban culture, collective memory and Yugo-nostalgia
- Notable works: Post-Socialist Political Graffiti in the Balkans and Central Europe

Mitja Velikonja (born 1965) is a Slovenian cultural studies academic and professor at the University of Ljubljana where he is head of the Center for Cultural and Religious Studies.

His book "Post-Socialist Political Graffiti in the Balkans and Central Europe" (Routledge, 2020), translated into 6 languages, received the prize for one of the highest annual accomplishments of the University of Ljubljana in 2020. His other books include "Masade duha - Razpotja sodobnih mitologij" (ZPS, Lj, 1996), "Mitografije sedanjosti" (Študentska založba, Lj, 2003), "Religious Separation and Political Intolerance in Bosnia-Herzegovina" (Texas A&M University Press, 2003), "Eurosis. A Critique of the New Eurocentrism" (Peace Institute, Lj, 2005), "Titostalgia - A Study of Nostalgia of Josip Broz" (Peace Institute, Lj, 2009), "Rock'n'retro - New Yugoslavism in Contemporary Popular Music in Slovenia" (Sophia, Lj, 2013), "The Chosen Few - Aesthetics and Ideology in Football Fan Graffiti" (DoppelHouse Press, LA, 2021) and "Ukrajinske vinjete - Eseji o kulturi bližnje vojne" (Miš, Domžale, 2024).

Velikonja was a visiting professor at multiple institutions which include Jagiellonian University (2002 and 2003), Columbia University (2009 and 2014), University of Rijeka (2015), New York Institute in Saint Petersburg (2015 and 2016) and Yale University (2020). He was a Fulbright visiting researcher in Rosemont College in Philadelphia (2004/2005), visiting researcher at Netherlands Institute for Advanced Study (2012) and at the Remarque Institute (2018). Among other topics his researches deal with ideological and cultural changes in post-socialist Central and Eastern Europe and the Balkans, Yugonostalgia and collective memory, street cultures and subcultures. He participated in a few Korčula after Party events, inspired by the Praxis School. He was one of contributing authors to the Slovenian book about Alan Ford and co-author and co-editor of books about the history of Yugoslavia (published by Serbian Helsinki Committee for Human Rights in 2017 and 2021). His book "Eurosis" got Erasmus EuroMedia Award by the European Society for Education and Communication (ESEC) Vienna in 2008, Ukrainian translation of "Titostalgia" award at Odesa Book Fair in 2024, "Ukrajinske vinjete" was nominated for the book of the year at the Slovenian Book Fair in 2024, while "The Chosen Few" was a finalist of the 2022 Next Generation Indie Book Awards (USA).
