= Oševljek =

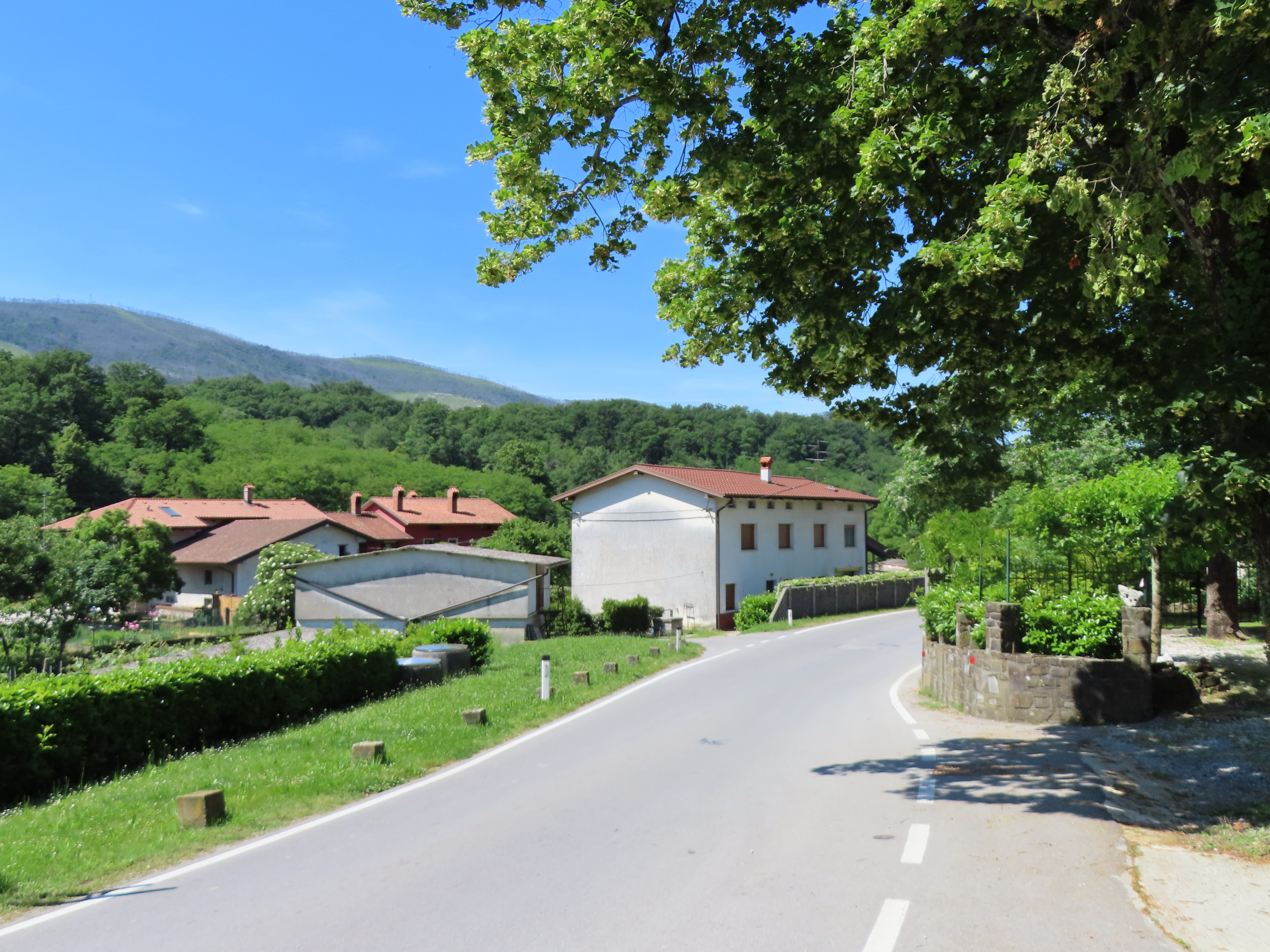

- Location in Slovenia
- Coordinates: 45°52′50.29″N 13°41′43.13″E
- Country: Slovenia
- Traditional region: Littoral
- Statistical region: Gorizia
- Municipality: Renče–Vogrsko

Area
  - Total: 3.86 km^{2} (1.49 sq mi)
- Elevation: 68.8 m (226 ft)

Population (2002)
  - Total: 187

Oševljek (pronounced [ɔˈʃeːu̯ljɛk]) is a settlement southeast of Renče in the Municipality of Renče–Vogrsko in the Littoral region of Slovenia. In 2002, Oševljek had a population of 187.

== Name ==
The name Oševljek (locally: Oševk) is derived from *olьševikъ 'alder woods', referring to the local vegetation. Related names include Olševek, Oševek, and Viševek (reshaped through folk etymology).

== Military cemetery ==
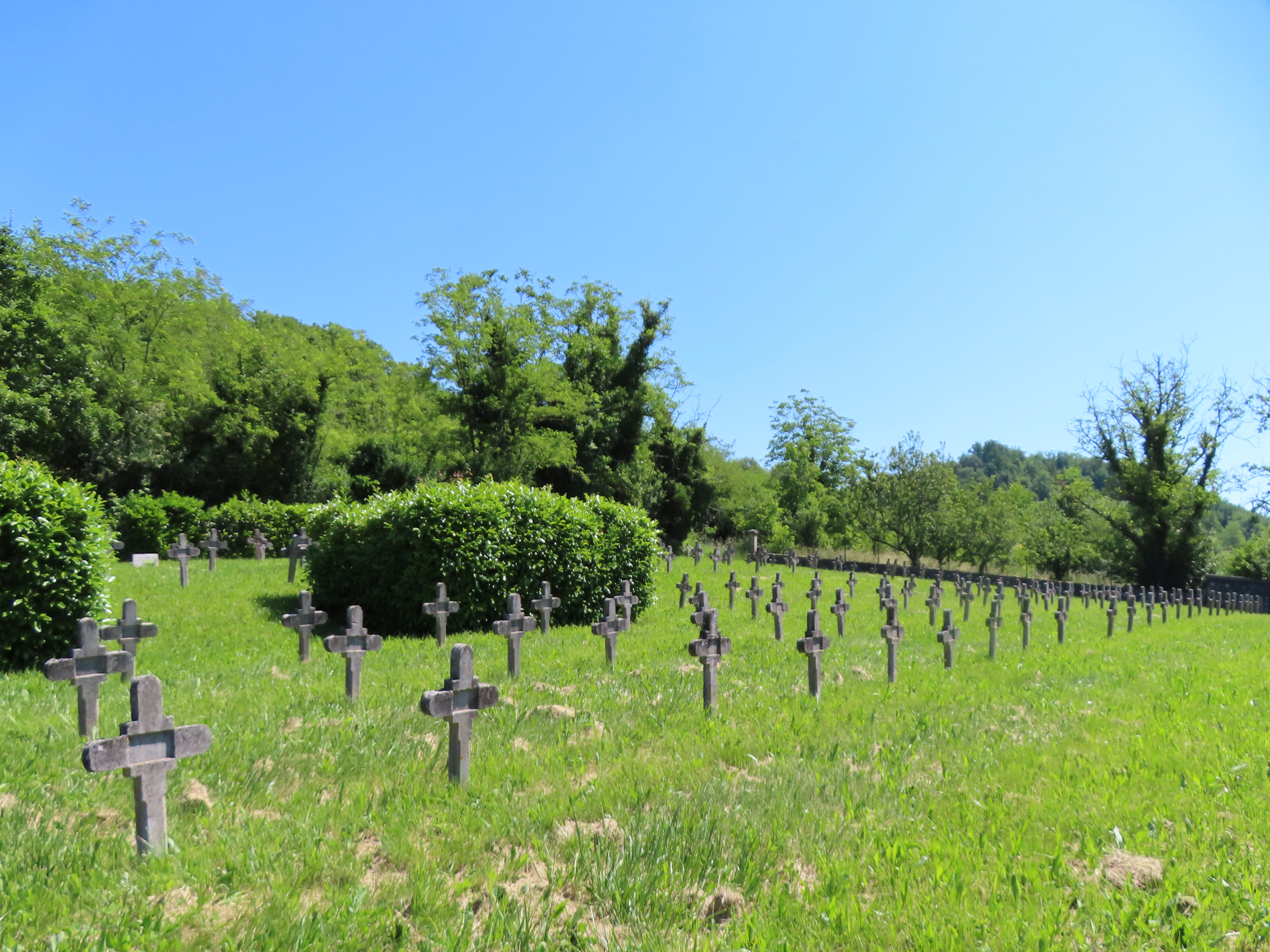
First World War cemetery

There is an Austro-Hungarian military cemetery from the First World War in Oševljek. The crosses are almost entirely preserved, and the damaged ones are attached to the wall surrounding the cemetery on three sides. According to military records, burials took place at the cemetery from December 16th, 1916, to the end of October 1917, and 927 soldiers were interred at the site. The majority of the interred soldiers were recruited from the Otočac area (in Croatia), the Klagenfurt area (in Austria), and the Ljubljana area. It was originally known as the Mohorini cemetery. The cemetery was renovated several times, most recently in 1980.
