= Martinuči =

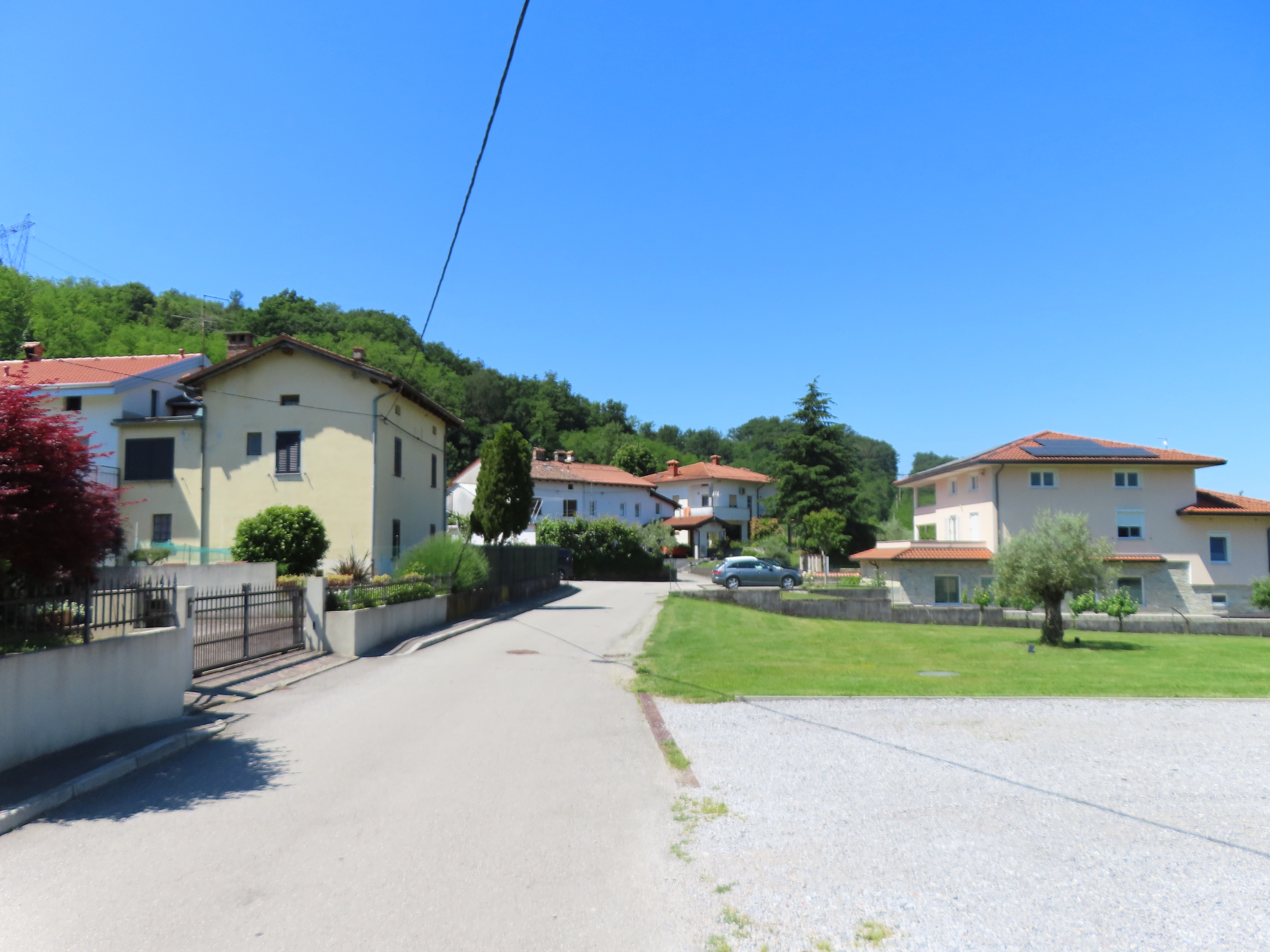

- Location in Slovenia
- Coordinates: 45°52′54″N 13°39′46″E
- Country: Slovenia
- Traditional region: Littoral
- Statistical region: Gorizia
- Municipality: Renče–Vogrsko
- Elevation: 56 m (184 ft)

Martinuči (pronounced [maɾtiˈnuːtʃi]; Italian: Martinucci) is a former settlement that is now part of Renče in western Slovenia in the Municipality of Renče–Vogrsko.

== History ==
Together with the villages of Arčoni, Lukežiči, Merljaki (Mrljaki until 1993), Mohorini, Renški Podkraj, and Žigoni, Martinuči was an independent settlement until 2000, when it was incorporated into Renče.
