= Renški Podkraj =

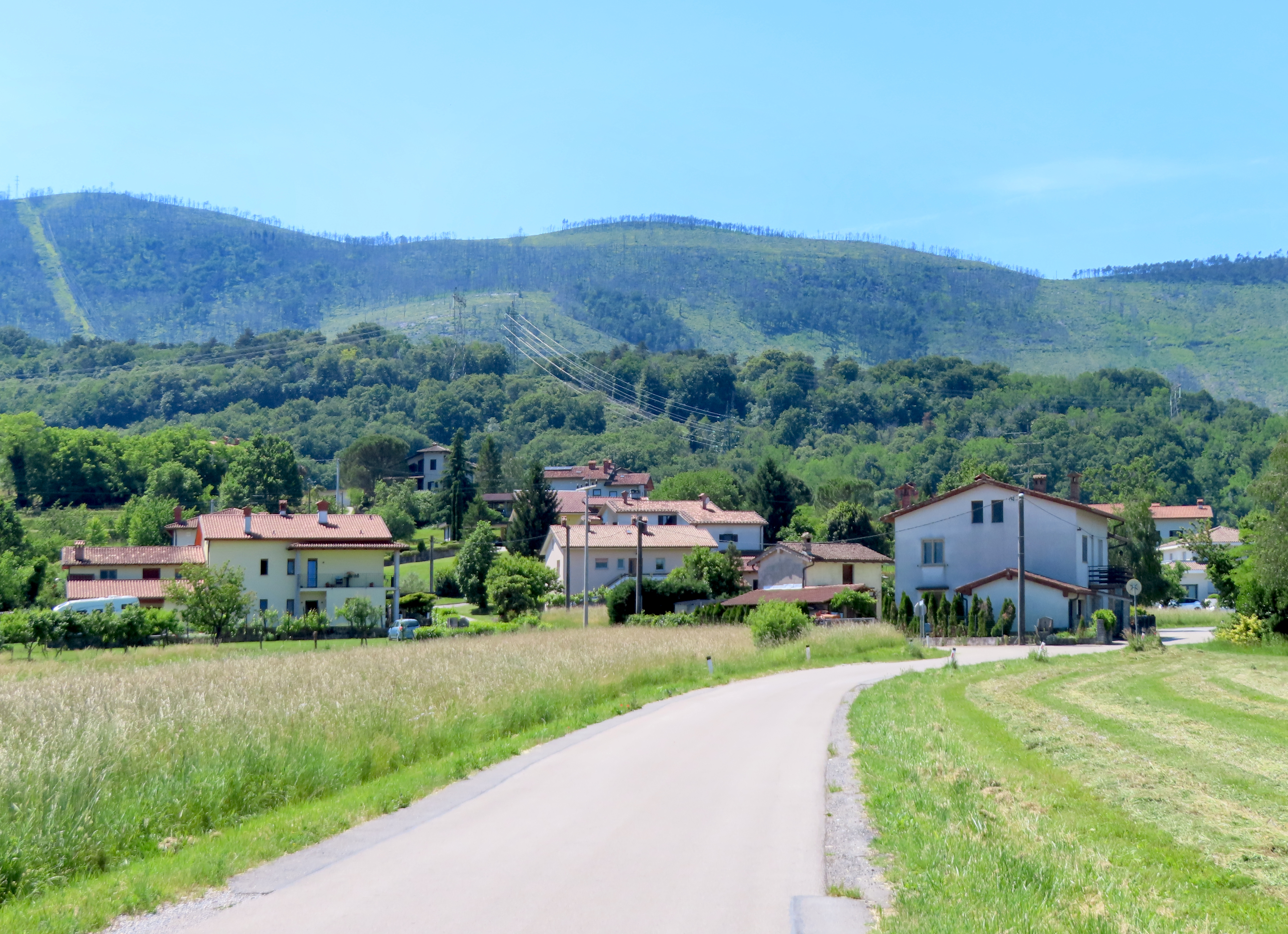

- Location in Slovenia
- Coordinates: 45°52′53″N 13°40′24″E
- Country: Slovenia
- Traditional region: Littoral
- Statistical region: Gorizia
- Municipality: Renče–Vogrsko
- Elevation: 75 m (246 ft)

Renški Podkraj (pronounced [ˈɾeːnʃki pɔtˈkɾai̯]) is a former settlement that is now part of Renče in western Slovenia in the Municipality of Renče–Vogrsko.

== History ==
Together with the villages of Arčoni, Lukežiči, Martinuči, Merljaki (Mrljaki until 1993), Mohorini, and Žigoni, Renški Podkraj was an independent settlement until 2000, when it was incorporated into Renče.
