= Dombrava =

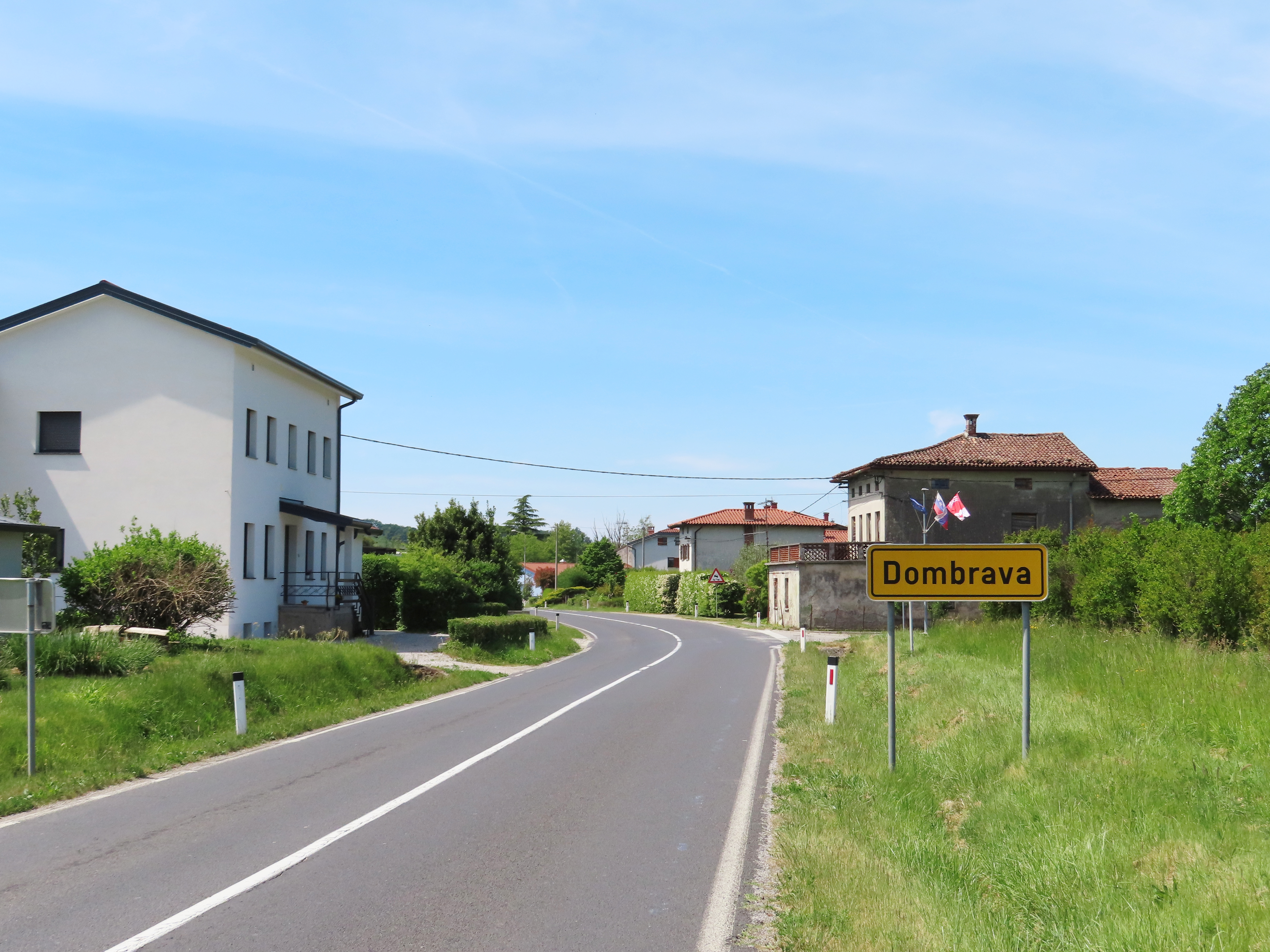

- Location in Slovenia
- Coordinates: 45°53′47.94″N 13°41′13.96″E
- Country: Slovenia
- Traditional region: Littoral
- Statistical region: Gorizia
- Municipality: Renče–Vogrsko

Area
  - Total: 1.49 km^{2} (0.58 sq mi)
- Elevation: 51.6 m (169 ft)

Population (2002)
  - Total: 55

Dombrava (pronounced [dɔmˈbɾaːʋa]) is a settlement in the lower Vipava Valley in the Municipality of Renče–Vogrsko in the Littoral region of Slovenia.

== Name ==
The name Dombrava, with an m reflecting the old nasal vowel *ǫ, shares its origin with the more frequent place name Dobrava (e.g., Dolenja Dobrava). Both are derived from Slavic *dǫbra̋va 'area with deciduous or oak woods' (cf. modern Slovene dobrava 'gently rolling partially wooded land'), referring to the local geography. This, in turn, is derived from Slavic *dǫ̂bъ 'deciduous tree, oak'.
