= Arčoni =

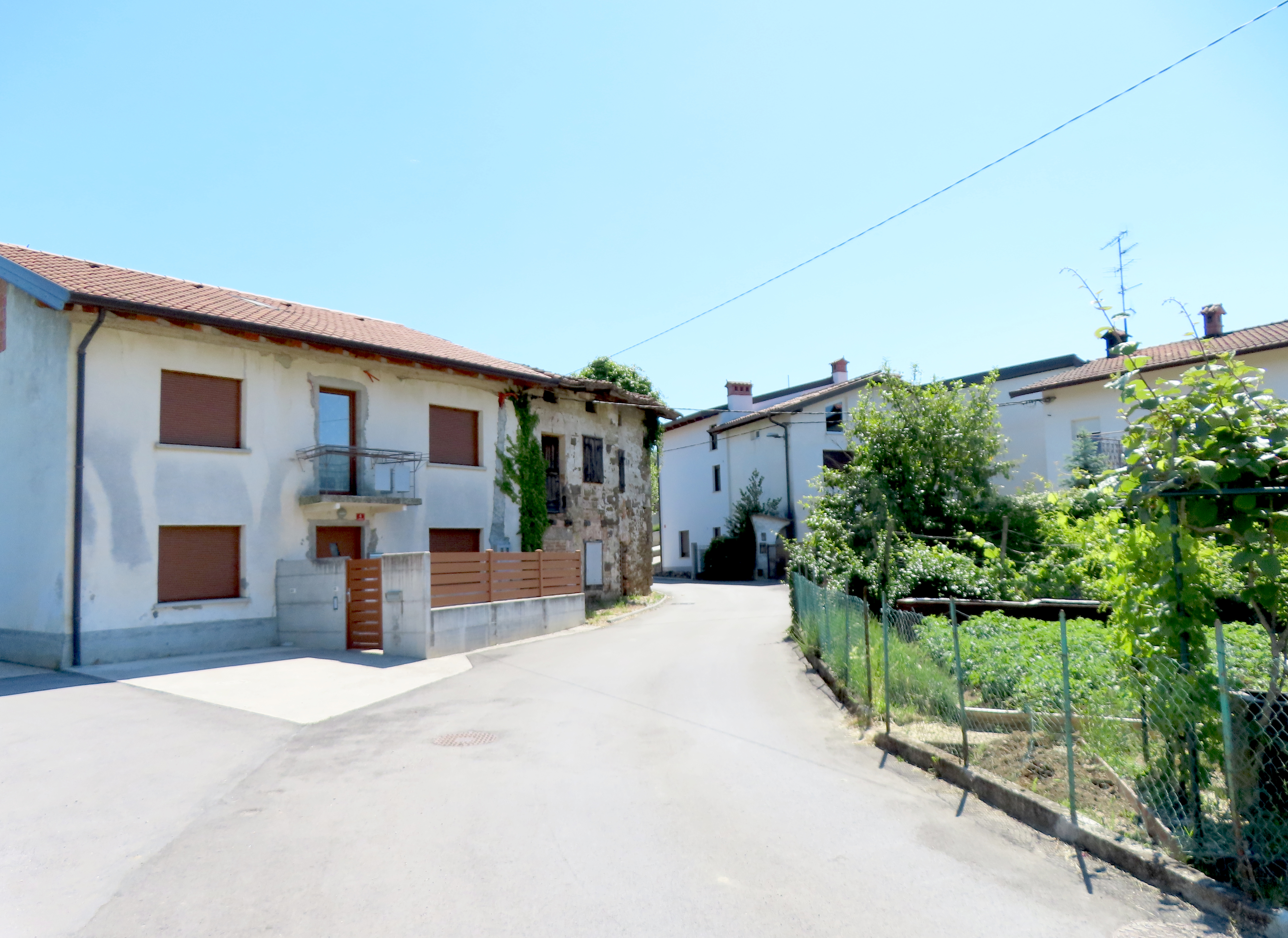

- Location in Slovenia
- Coordinates: 45°53′17″N 13°40′52″E
- Country: Slovenia
- Traditional region: Littoral
- Statistical region: Gorizia
- Municipality: Renče–Vogrsko
- Elevation: 60 m (200 ft)

Population (2002)
  - Total: 127

Arčoni (pronounced [aɾˈtʃoːni]; Italian: Arcioni) is a former settlement that is now part of Renče in western Slovenia in the Municipality of Renče–Vogrsko.

== History ==
Together with the villages of Lukežiči, Martinuči, Merljaki (Mrljaki until 1993), Mohorini, Renški Podkraj, and Žigoni, Arčoni was an independent settlement until 2000, when it was incorporated into Renče.
