= Merljaki =

Merljaki Mrljaki (until 1993)
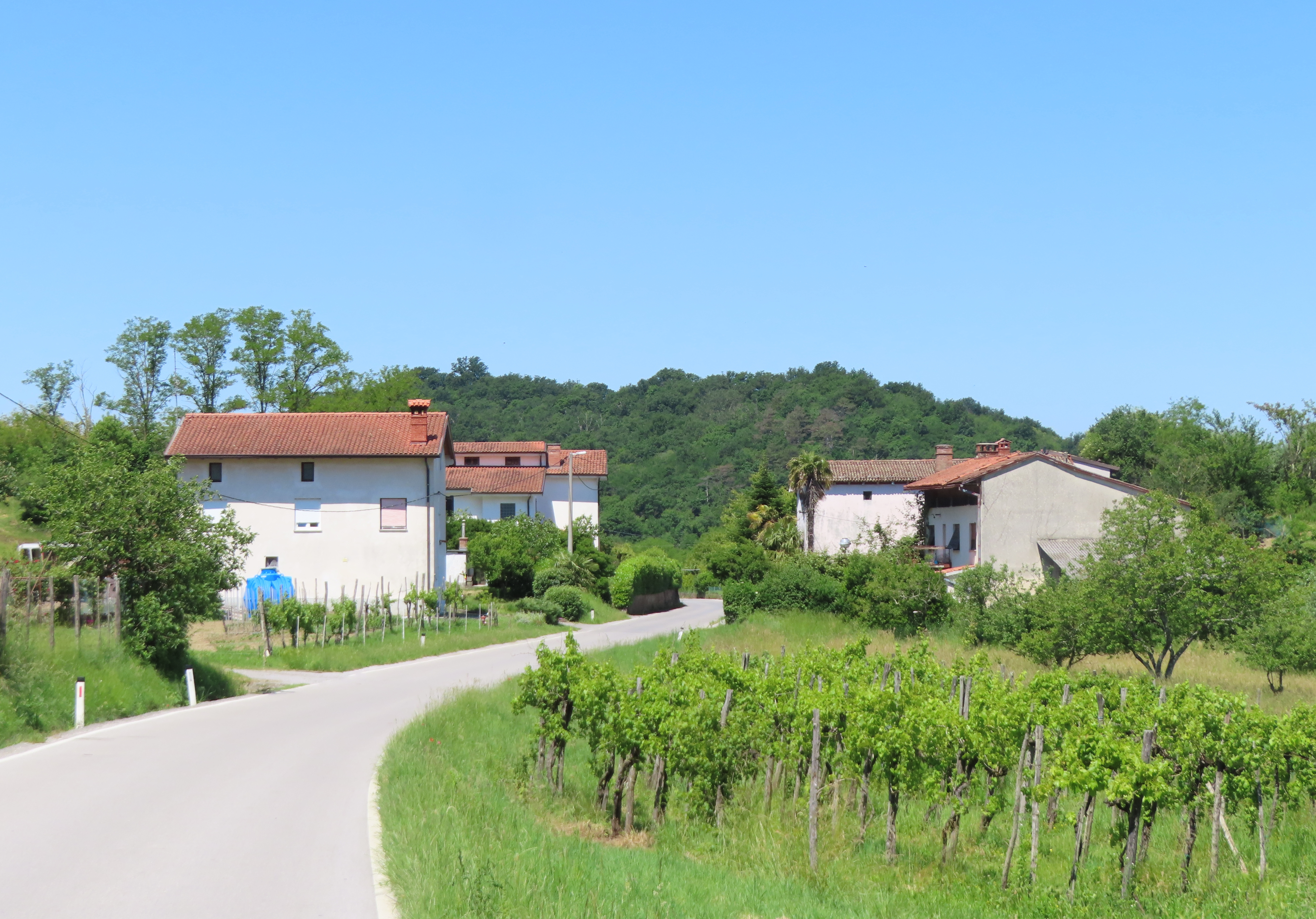

- Location in Slovenia
- Coordinates: 45°53′08″N 13°38′39″E
- Country: Slovenia
- Traditional region: Littoral
- Statistical region: Gorizia
- Municipality: Renče–Vogrsko
- Elevation: 53 m (174 ft)

Merljaki (pronounced [məɾˈljaːki], until 1993 Mrljaki; Italian: Merliachi) is a former settlement that is now part of Renče in western Slovenia in the Municipality of Renče–Vogrsko.

== History ==
Together with the villages of Arčoni, Lukežiči, Martinuči, Mohorini, Renški Podkraj, and Žigoni, Merljaki was an independent settlement until 2000, when it was incorporated into Renče.
