= Lukežiči =

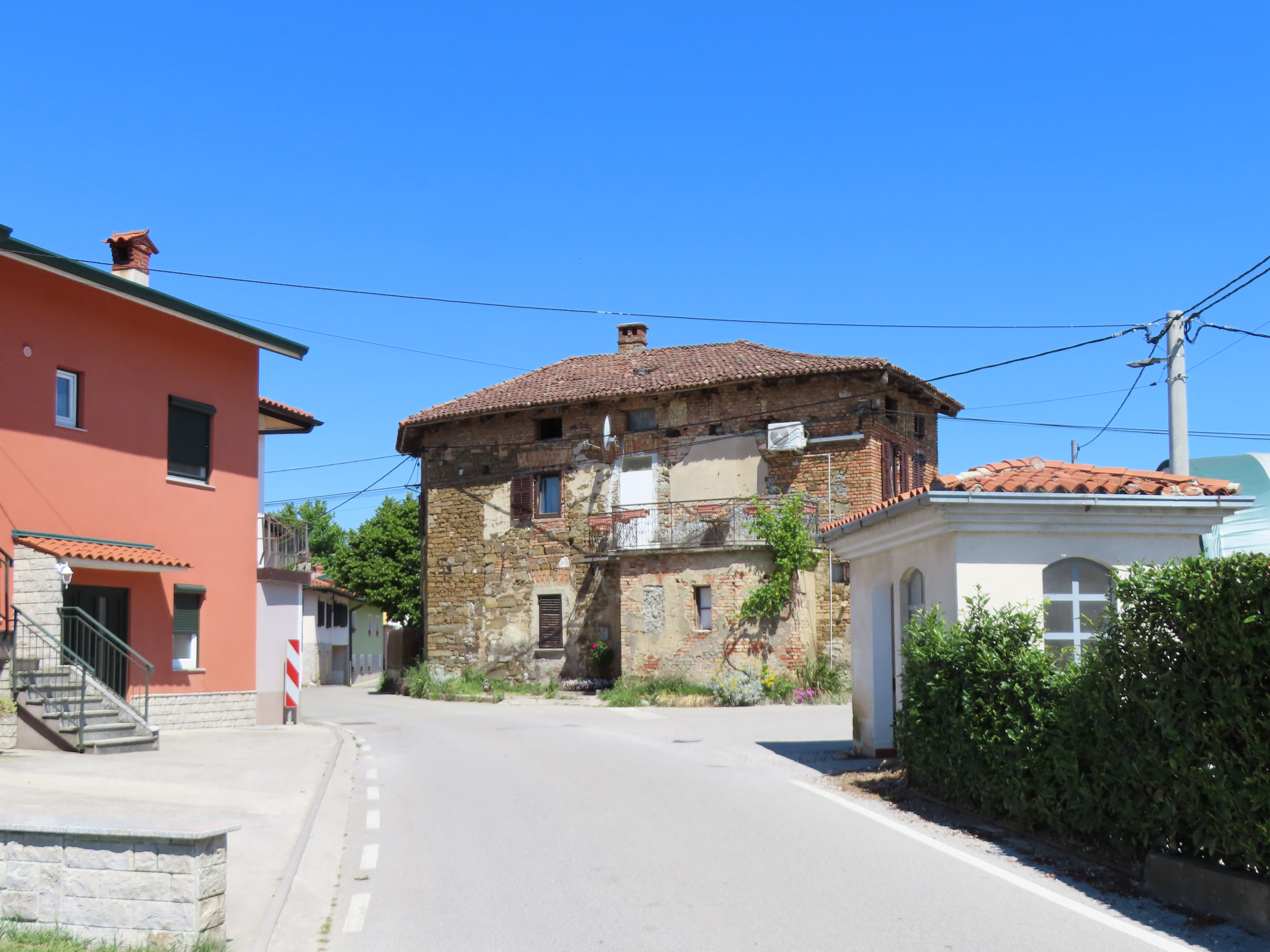

- Location in Slovenia
- Coordinates: 45°53′05″N 13°40′52″E
- Country: Slovenia
- Traditional region: Littoral
- Statistical region: Gorizia
- Municipality: Renče–Vogrsko
- Elevation: 59 m (194 ft)

Lukežiči (pronounced [ˈluːkeʒitʃi]; Italian: Luchesia) is a former settlement that is now part of Renče in western Slovenia in the Municipality of Renče–Vogrsko.

== History ==
Together with the villages of Arčoni, Martinuči, Merljaki (Mrljaki until 1993), Mohorini, Renški Podkraj, and Žigoni, Lukežiči was an independent settlement until 2000, when it was incorporated into Renče.

== Military cemetery ==
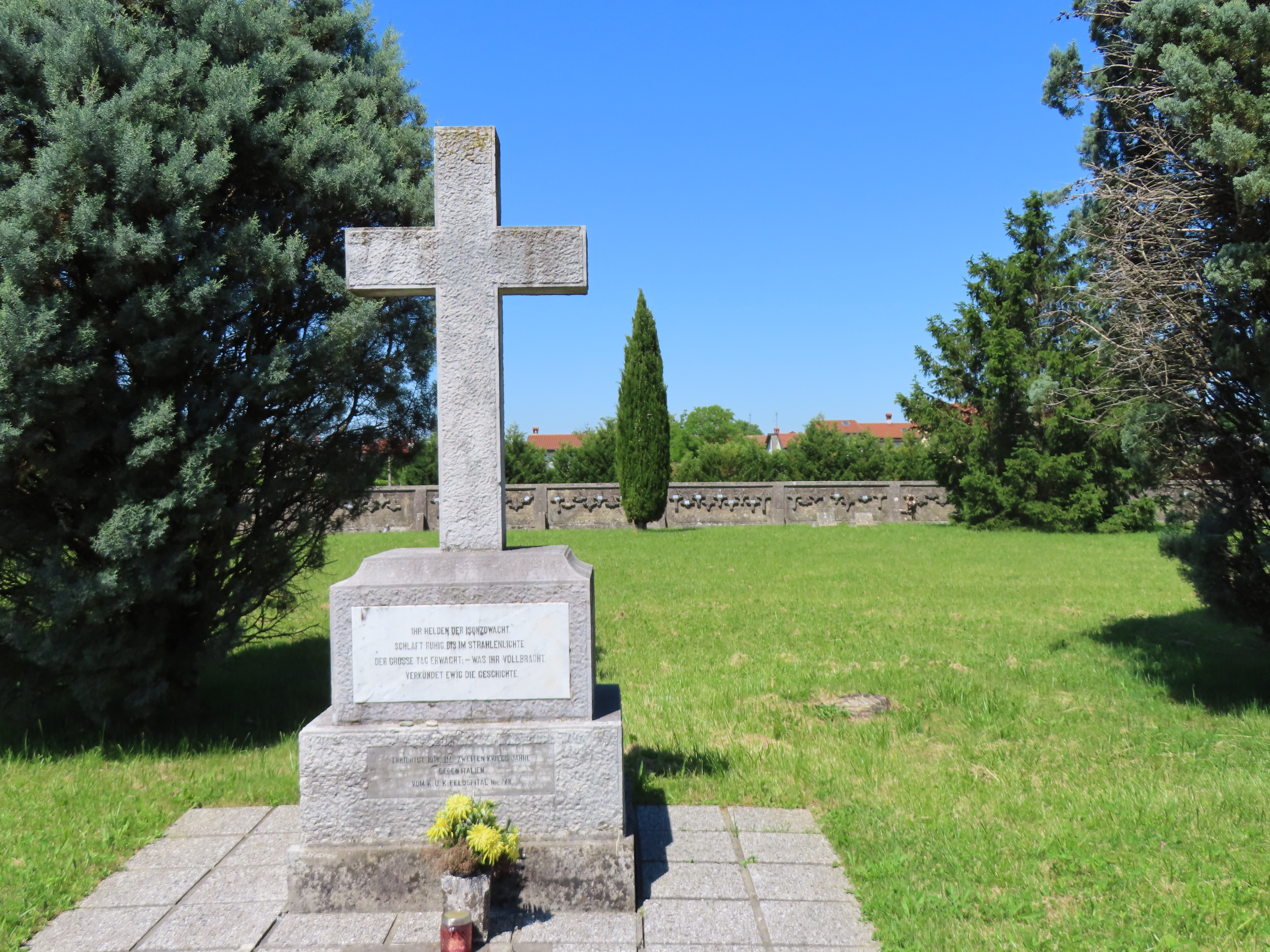
First World War cemetery

There is an Austro-Hungarian military cemetery from the First World War in Lukežiči. The arrangement of the graves is no longer visible. Following renovation, part of the military cemetery was converted into a civil cemetery.
