= Žigoni =

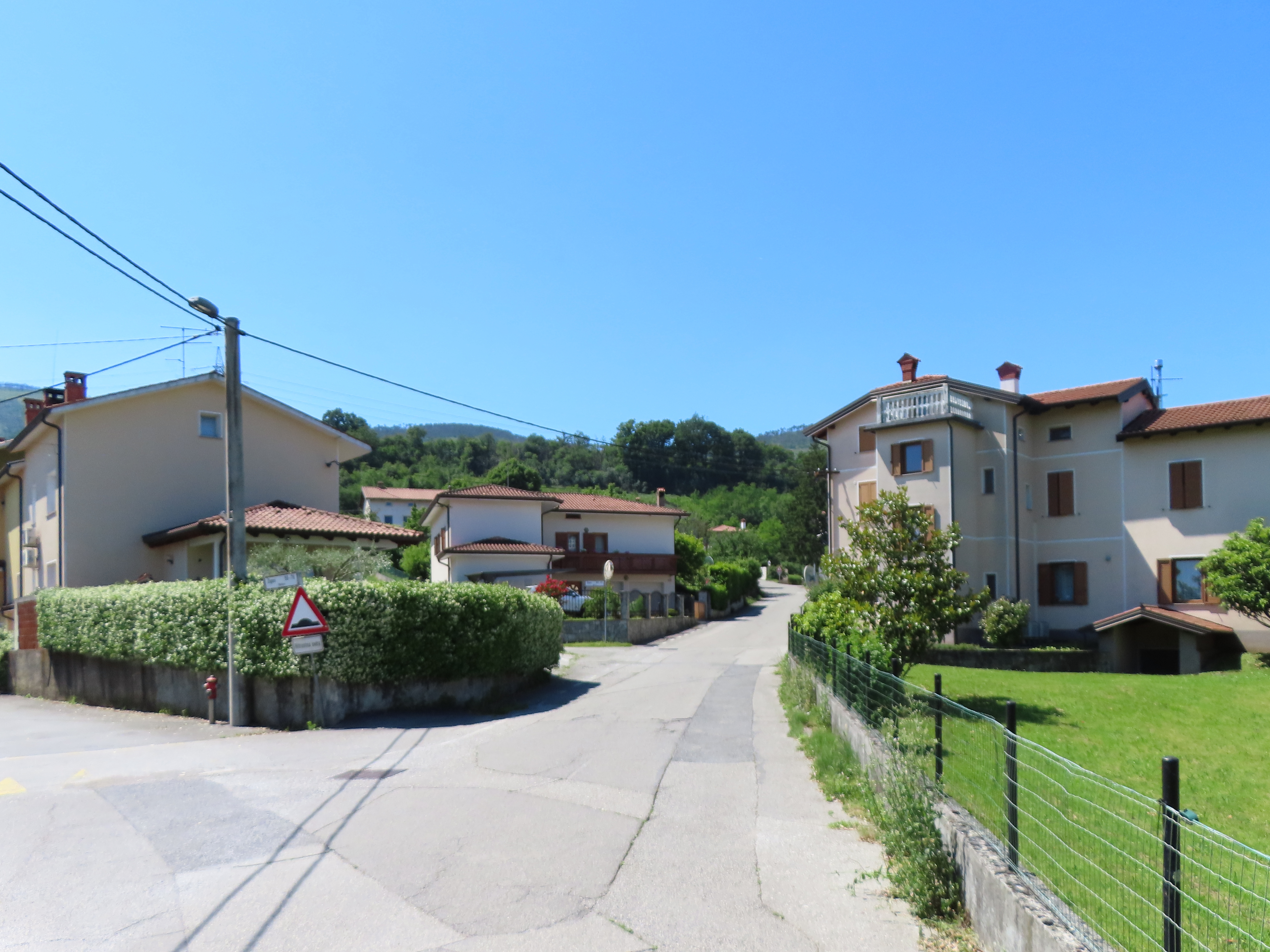

- Location in Slovenia
- Coordinates: 45°52′47″N 13°39′58″E
- Country: Slovenia
- Traditional region: Littoral
- Statistical region: Gorizia
- Municipality: Renče–Vogrsko
- Elevation: 70 m (230 ft)

Žigoni (pronounced [ʒiˈɡoːni]; Italian: Zigoni) is a former settlement that is now part of Renče in western Slovenia in the Municipality of Renče–Vogrsko.

== Geography ==
Žigoni is a clustered village south of the old core of Renče at the foot of the Vipava Hills, extending south to the base of the Komen Plateau. Along the slope, it includes the hamlets of Ozrenj, Potok, Robince, Tejce, Velika Pot, and Venišče. A road from Renče to the Komen Plateau, built during the First World War, passes through the village, and there are additional road connections from Žigoni to Miren to the west and to Gradišče nad Prvačino to the east. Surrounding elevations include Fajti Hill (Fajtji hrib, Fajti hrib, Fajtov hrib, or simply Fajti; elevation 434 meters or 1,424 feet), Big Peak (Veliki vrh; elevation 463 meters or 1,519 feet), and Trešnik Hill (elevation 508 meters or 1,667 feet). There are many streams; in addition to Renč Creek, smaller watercourses include Ozrenj Creek (Ozrenjski potok), Tomaž Creek (Tomaški potok), Špacapani Creek (Špacapanski potok), Ovčjak Creek, and Oševljek Creek. Springs include Matjažar Spring (Matjažarski studenec) to the west and Žigoni Spring (Žgonski studenec). The lower part of the village, where tilled fields are located, has loamy soil; higher up, where there are vineyards, there is marl soil; and this transitions to limestone karst terrain at higher elevations.

== History ==
Together with the villages of Arčoni, Lukežiči, Martinuči, Merljaki (Mrljaki until 1993), Mohorini, and Renški Podkraj, Žigoni was an independent settlement until 2000, when it was incorporated into Renče.

== Cultural heritage ==
In the hamlet of Ozrenj, there are the ruins of a Cistercian monastery that was active around 1400. Above Ozrenj was a church dedicated to Mary Magdalene, mentioned in visitation reports from 1570 to 1758. There was once a cemetery next to the church. Above the hamlet of Venišče, on Long Hill (Dolgo brdo), there are ruins that include the remnants of church architecture. According to oral tradition, a church dedicated to Saint Isidore stood there along with the summer residence of the counts of Renče.
