= Volčja Draga =

- Location in Slovenia
- Coordinates: 45°54′10.82″N 13°40′35.37″E
- Country: Slovenia
- Traditional region: Littoral
- Statistical region: Gorizia
- Municipality: Renče–Vogrsko

Area
  - Total: 1.19 km^{2} (0.46 sq mi)
- Elevation: 52.3 m (172 ft)

Population (2002)
  - Total: 697

Volčja Draga (pronounced [ˈʋoːu̯tʃja ˈdɾaːɡa]; Italian: Valvolciana) is a settlement in the Municipality of Renče–Vogrsko in the Littoral region of Slovenia.

== Name ==
The name Volčja Draga literally means 'wolf valley'. The first part of the name is derived from the Slovene adjective volčji (literally, 'wolf'), which may refer to the animal (< volk 'wolf') or to the related Slavic personal name *Vьlkъ. The second part of the name is from the common noun draga 'small, narrow valley', referring to the geographical location of the settlement.
