= Gorenja Dobrava, Gorenja Vas–Poljane =

Gorenja Dobrava
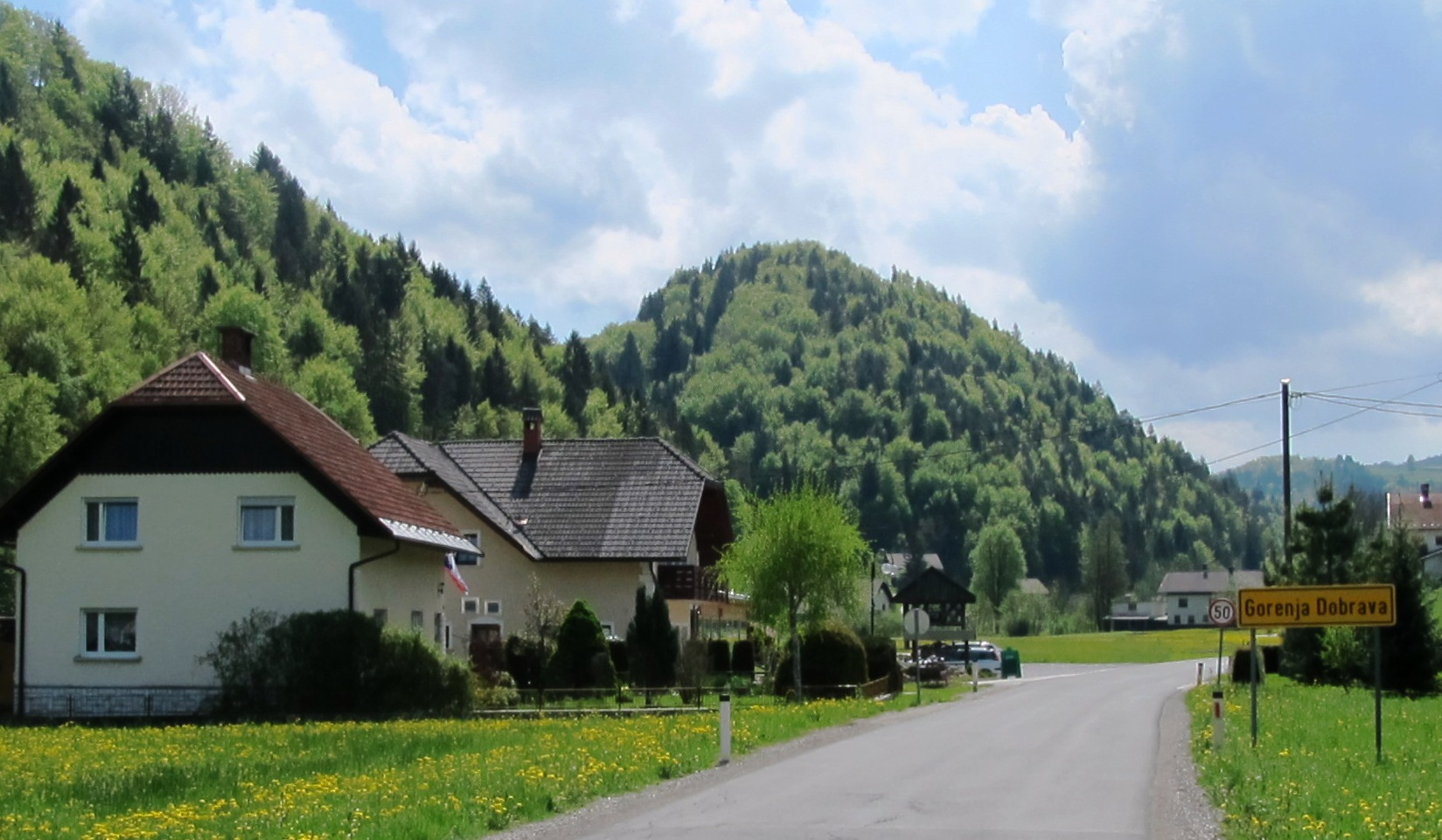
- Gorenja Dobrava

- Location in Slovenia
- Coordinates: 46°5′38″N 14°9′21.64″E
- Country: Slovenia
- Traditional region: Upper Carniola
- Statistical region: Upper Carniola
- Municipality: Gorenja Vas–Poljane

Area
  - Total: 1.87 km^{2} (0.72 sq mi)
- Elevation: 407.5 m (1,337 ft)

Population (2020)
  - Total: 153
  - Density: 81.8/km^{2} (212/sq mi)

Gorenja Dobrava (pronounced [ɡɔˈɾeːnja dɔˈbɾaːʋa]) is a settlement south of Gorenja Vas in the Municipality of Gorenja Vas–Poljane in the Upper Carniola region of Slovenia.

== Name ==
The name Gorenja Dobrava means 'upper Dobrava', contrasting with neighboring Dolenja Dobrava (literally, 'lower Dobrava'), which stands about 4 meters (13 ft) lower. Gorenja Dobrava was attested in historical sources as Hard Superiori in 1291, Superiori Hard in 1318, Dobraw in 1420, and Gorenidobraui in 1500. The place name Dobrava is relatively frequent in Slovenia. It is derived from the Slovene common noun dobrava 'gently rolling partially wooded land' (and archaically 'woods, grove'). The name therefore refers to the local geography.

== Church ==
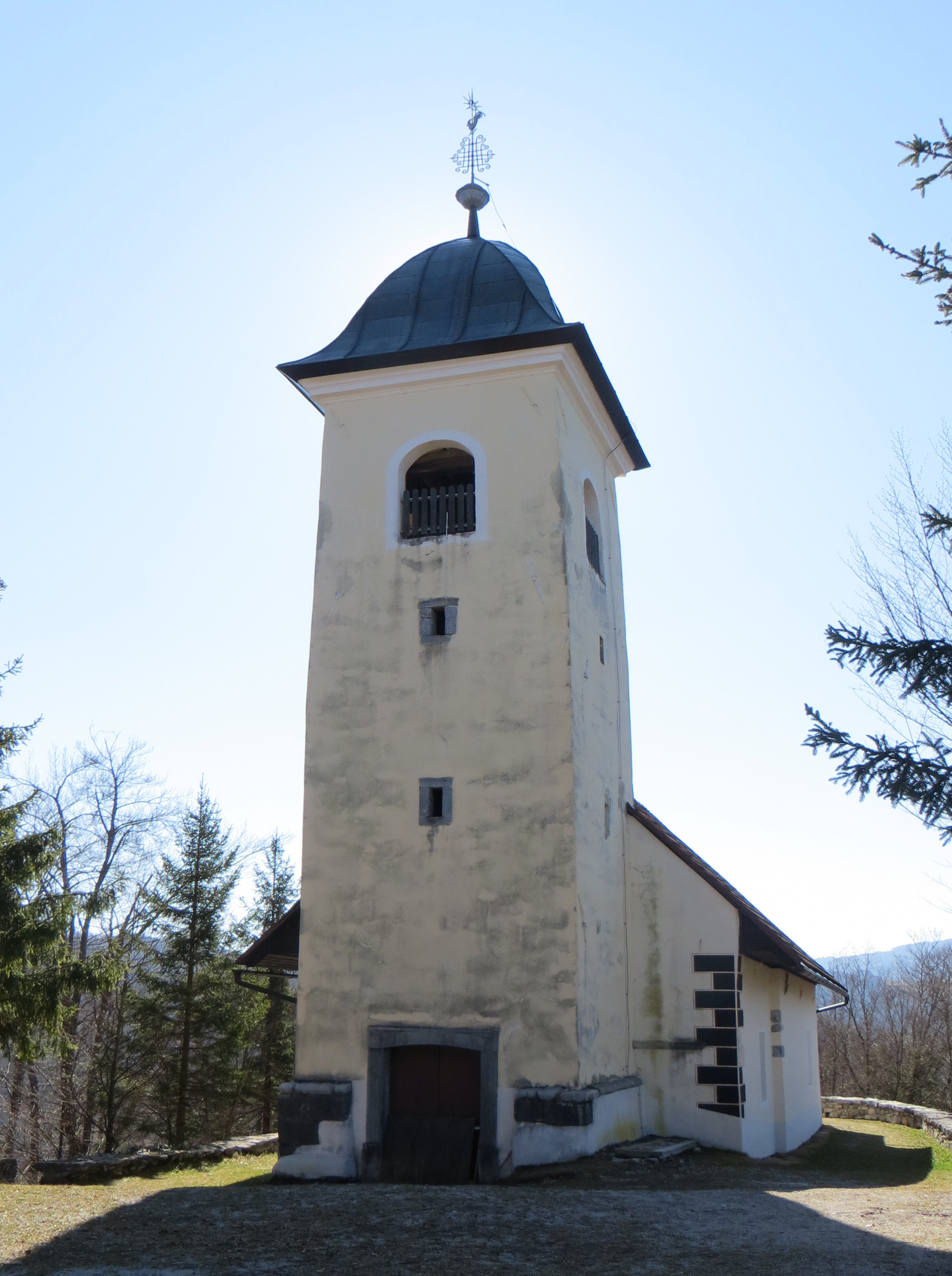
Saint Urban's Church

The local church is dedicated to Saint Urban. The oldest part of the church dates to the early 16th century, but it was later extended and the Baroque belfry was added. A fresco of Saint Christopher is preserved on its exterior wall.
