= Vogrsko =

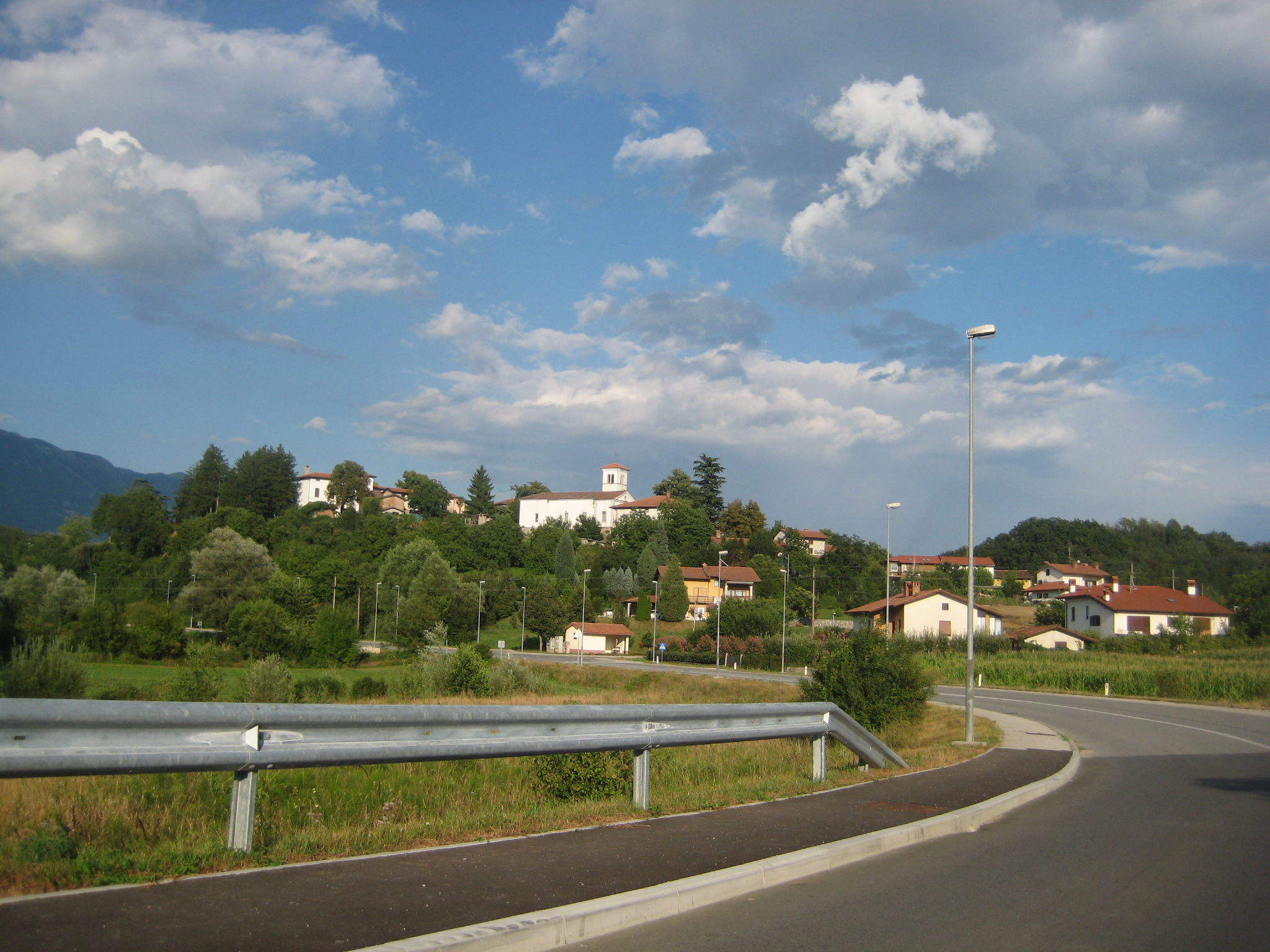

- Location in Slovenia
- Coordinates: 45°54′18.6″N 13°42′29.33″E
- Country: Slovenia
- Traditional region: Littoral
- Statistical region: Gorizia
- Municipality: Renče–Vogrsko

Area
  - Total: 7.77 km^{2} (3.00 sq mi)
- Elevation: 62.7 m (206 ft)

Population (2002)
  - Total: 796

Vogrsko (pronounced [ˈʋoːɡəɾskɔ]; Friulian: Ungrispac, Italian: Voghersca) is a settlement in the lower Vipava Valley in the Municipality of Renče–Vogrsko in the Littoral region of Slovenia.

The parish church in the settlement is dedicated to Saint Justus and belongs to the Diocese of Koper.
