= Renče =

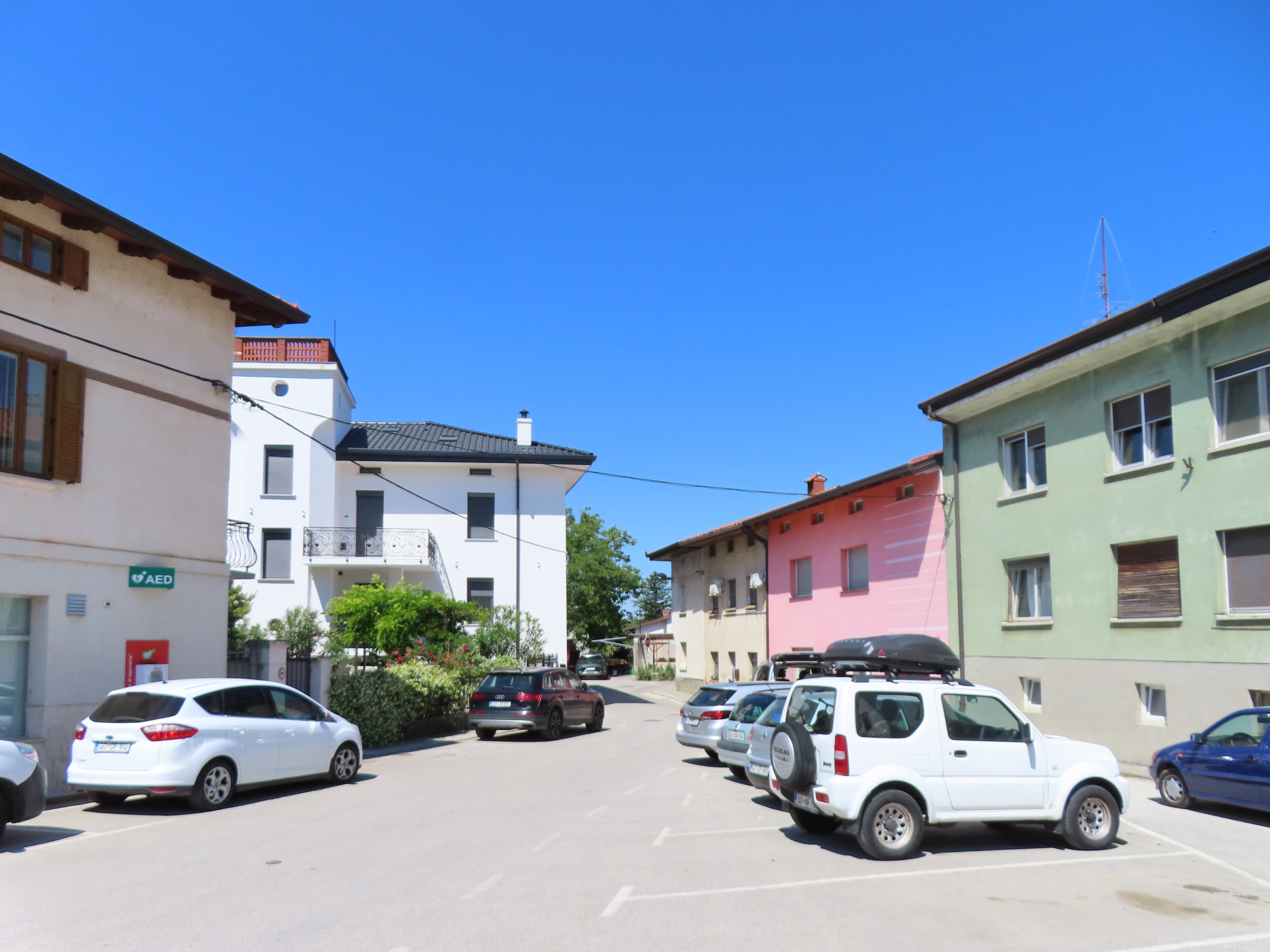

- Location in Slovenia
- Coordinates: 45°53′23.25″N 13°40′11.92″E
- Country: Slovenia
- Traditional region: Littoral
- Statistical region: Gorizia
- Municipality: Renče–Vogrsko

Area
  - Total: 12.18 km^{2} (4.70 sq mi)
- Elevation: 50.8 m (167 ft)

Population (2002)
  - Total: 217

Renče (pronounced [ˈɾeːntʃɛ]; Italian: Ranziano) is a settlement in the lower Vipava Valley in the Municipality of Renče–Vogrsko in the Littoral region of Slovenia.

== History ==
The hamlets of Arčoni, Lukežiči, Martinuči, Merljaki (Mrljaki until 1993), Mohorini, Renški Podkraj, and Žigoni were independent settlements until 2000, when they were incorporated into Renče.

== Church ==
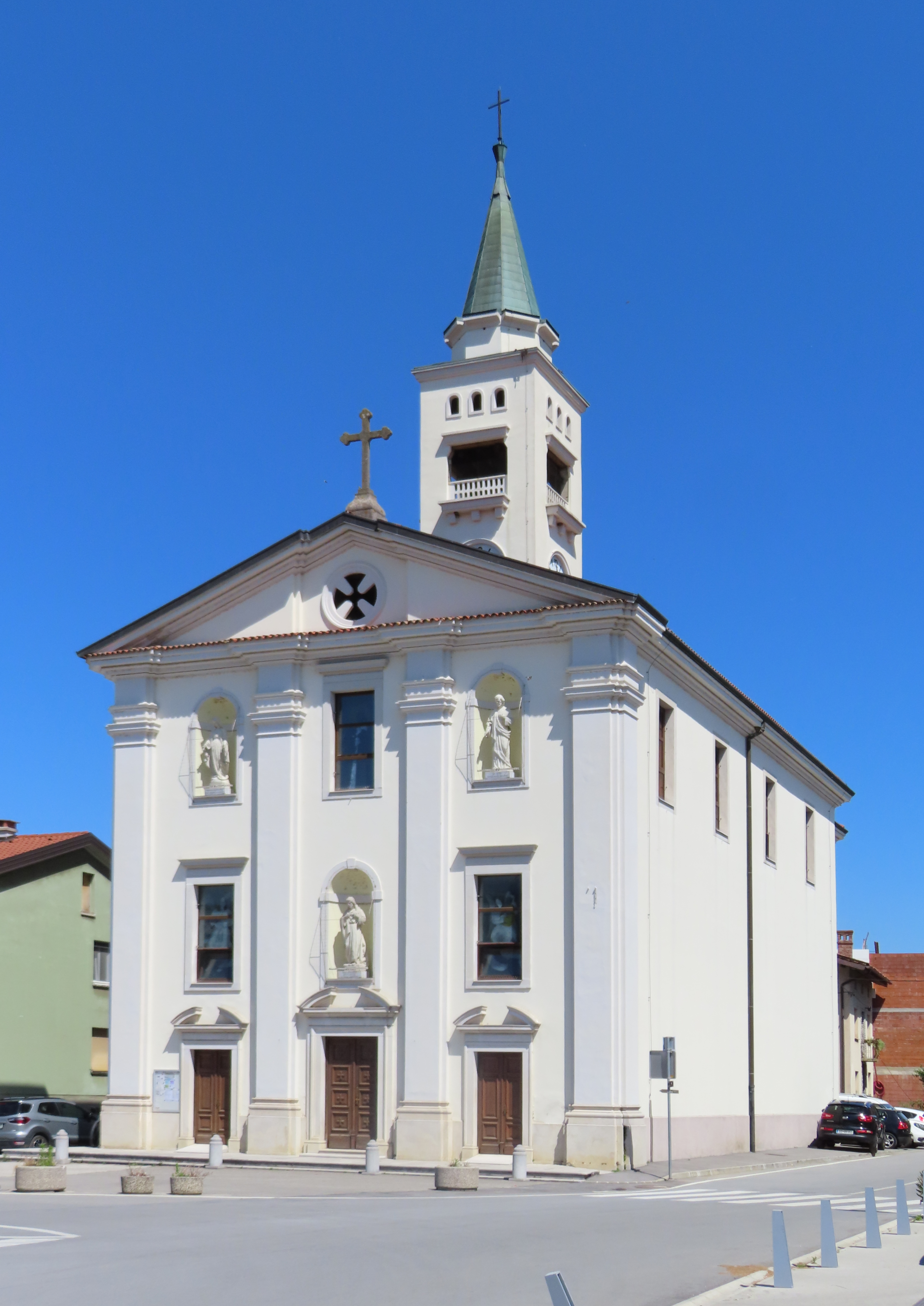
Saints Hermagoras and Fortunatus Church

The parish church in the settlement is dedicated to Saints Hermagoras and Fortunatus and belongs to the Diocese of Koper.
