= Dolenja Dobrava, Gorenja Vas–Poljane =

Dolenja Dobrava
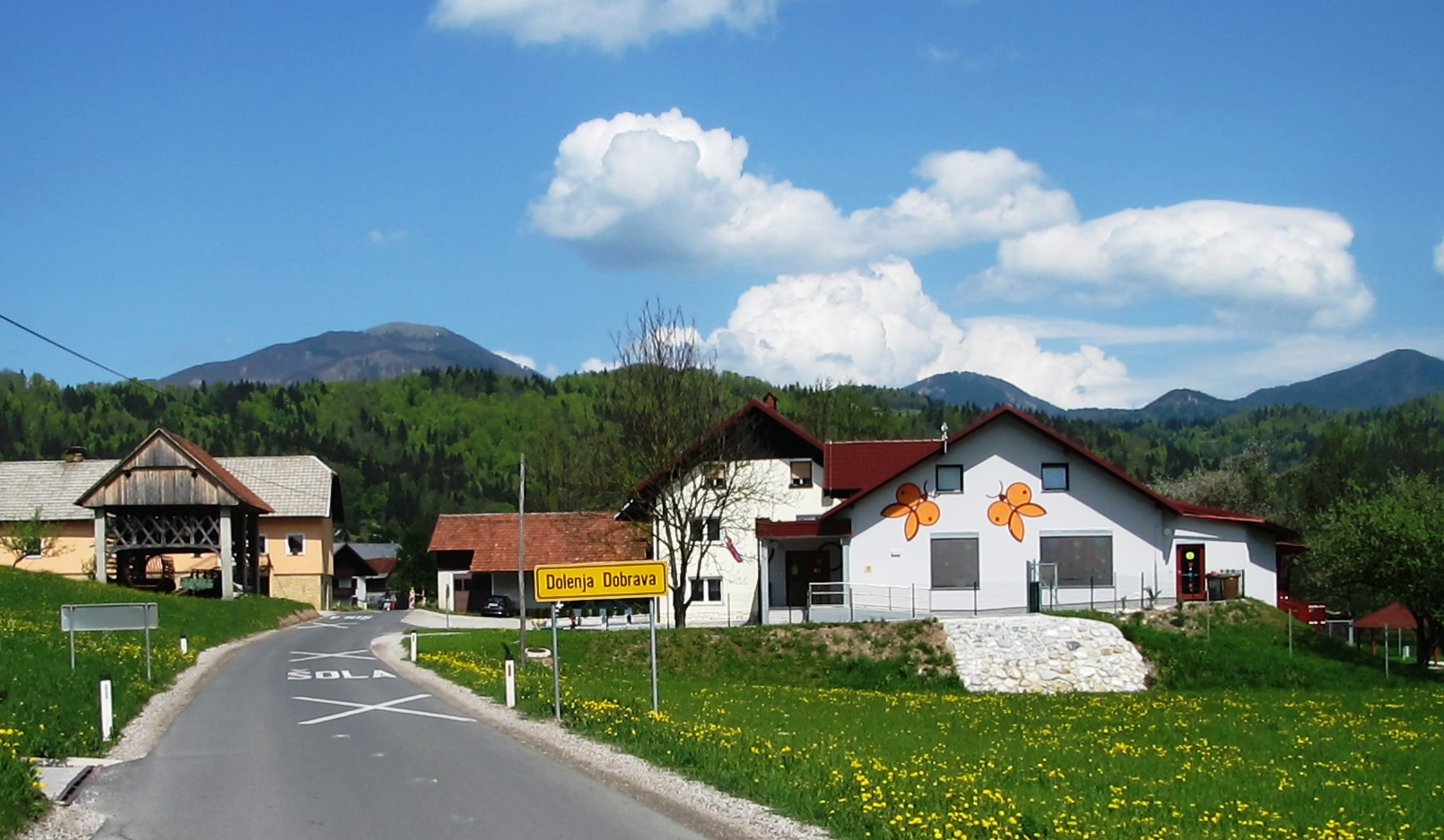
- Dolenja Dobrava

- Location in Slovenia
- Coordinates: 46°6′1.55″N 14°9′4.57″E
- Country: Slovenia
- Traditional region: Upper Carniola
- Statistical region: Upper Carniola
- Municipality: Gorenja Vas–Poljane

Area
  - Total: 1.24 km^{2} (0.48 sq mi)
- Elevation: 403.7 m (1,324 ft)

Population (2020)
  - Total: 204
  - Density: 165/km^{2} (426/sq mi)

Dolenja Dobrava (pronounced [dɔˈleːnja dɔˈbɾaːʋa]; German: Doleinadobrawa) is a small village on the right bank of the Poljane Sora River in the Municipality of Gorenja Vas–Poljane in the Upper Carniola region of Slovenia.

== Geography ==
Dolenja Dobrava is a clustered village on a low terrace between the Poljane Sora River and Brebovščica River. Mihevk Creek, a tributary of the Poljane Sora, flows just north of the village center. Zviršek Spring lies east of the village below the Reber Ridge. There are tilled fields and meadows in the plain between the Poljane Sora and Brebovščica rivers, and hay fields and woods to the east.

== Name ==
The name Dolenja Dobrava means 'lower Dobrava', contrasting with neighboring Gorenja Dobrava (literally, 'upper Dobrava'), which stands about 4 meters (13 ft) higher. Dolenja Dobrava was attested in historical sources as Hard Inferiori in 1291, Dobraw in 1420, and Dolenidobraui in 1500. The place name Dobrava is relatively frequent in Slovenia. It is derived from the Slovene common noun dobrava 'gently rolling partially wooded land' (and archaically 'woods, grove'). The name therefore refers to the local geography.

== Cultural heritage ==
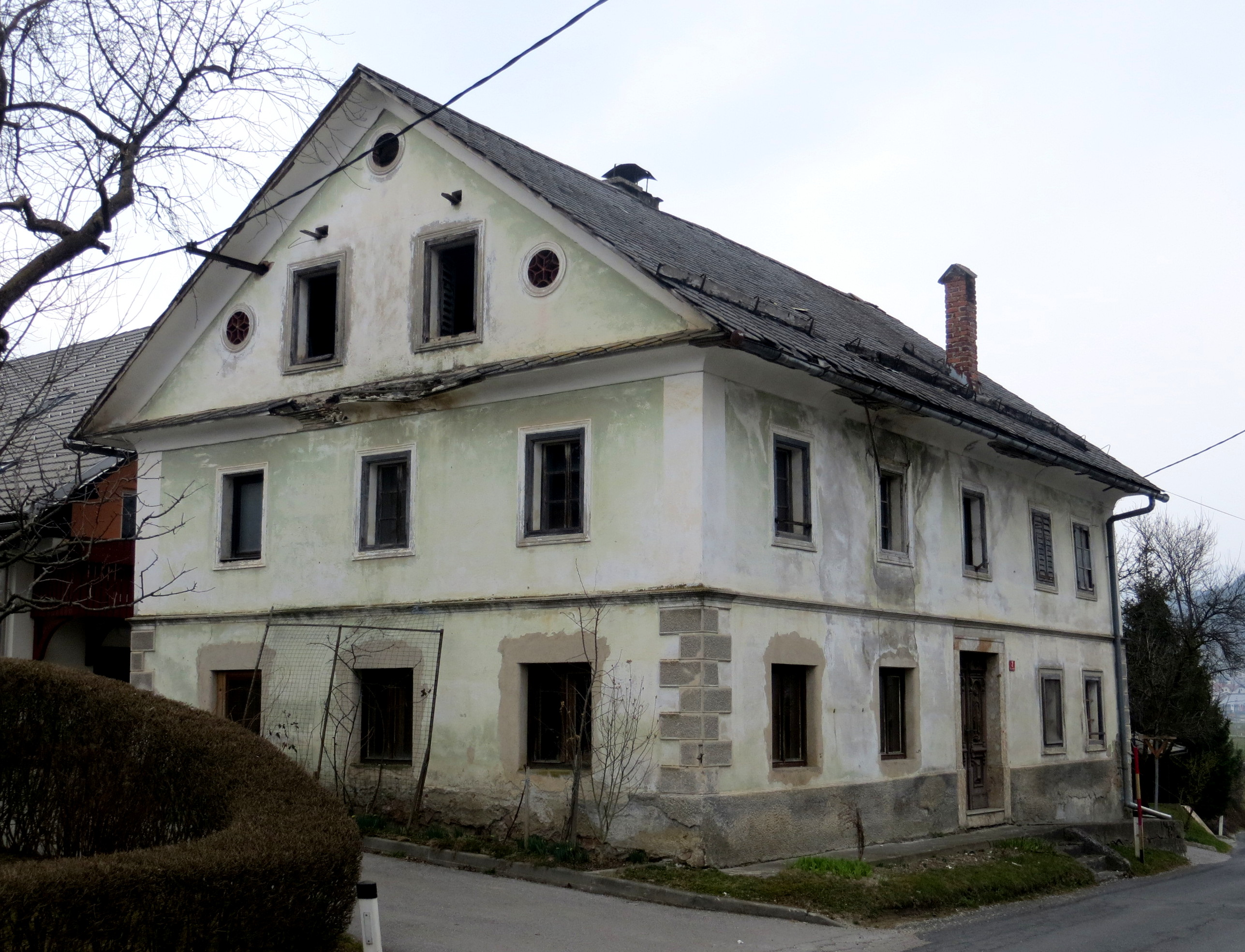
View from southeast

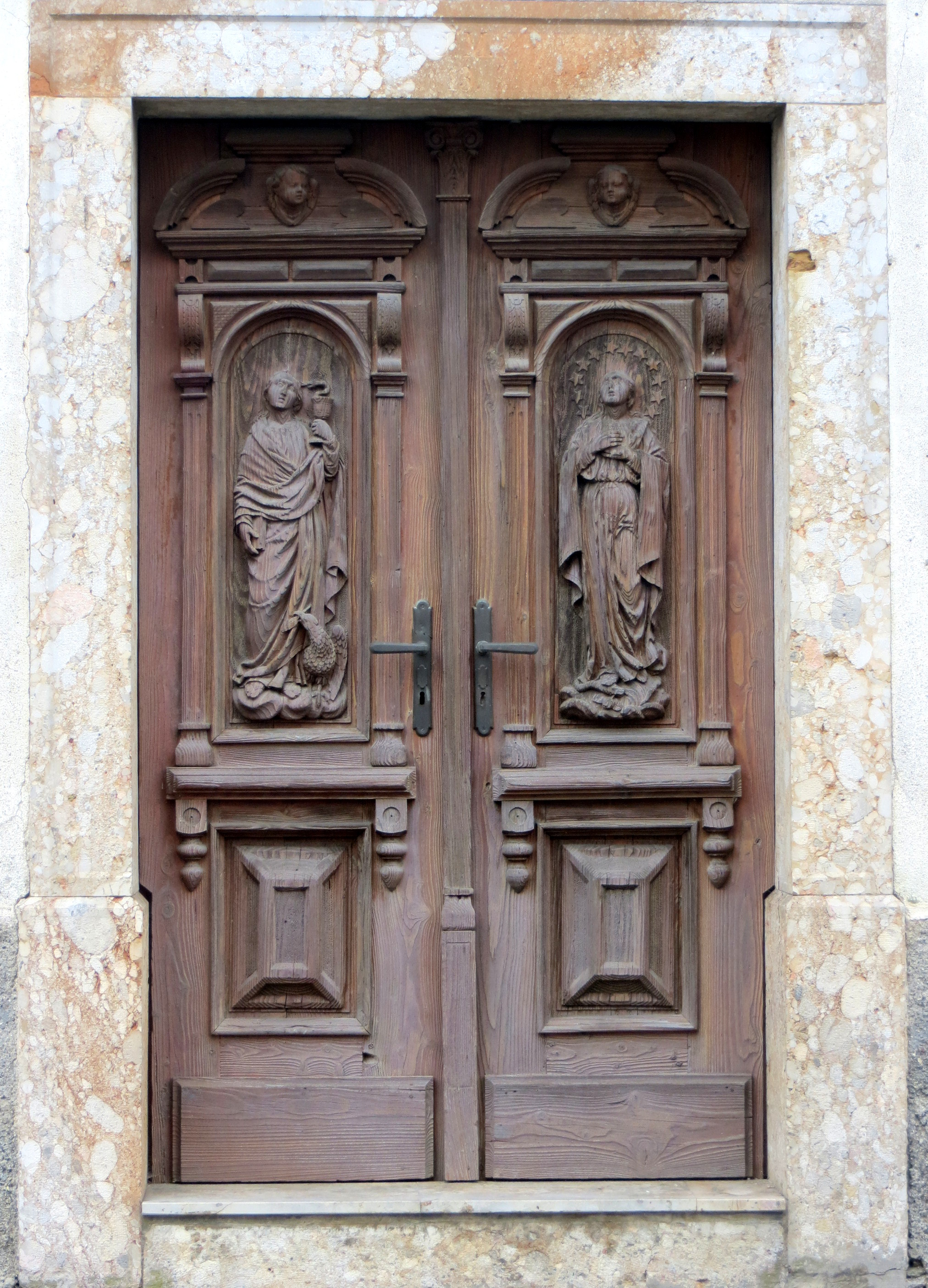
Door detail

Dolenja Dobrava no. 2

The house at Dolenja Dobrava no. 2 is registered as cultural heritage. The building stands along the road from Gorneja Vas to Dolenja Dobrava. It is a two-story structure with a decorated facade, including quoined corners, carved window frames, and a gable cornice. The wooden entry doors are carved with figures in low-relief and bear the year 1908, and the rectangular door frame is made of marble and dates from 1888. The house was built before 1825 and has been remodeled several times.
