= Municipality of Renče–Vogrsko =

Municipality of Slovenia

Municipality of Renče–Vogrsko Občina Renče - Vogrsko
- Municipality
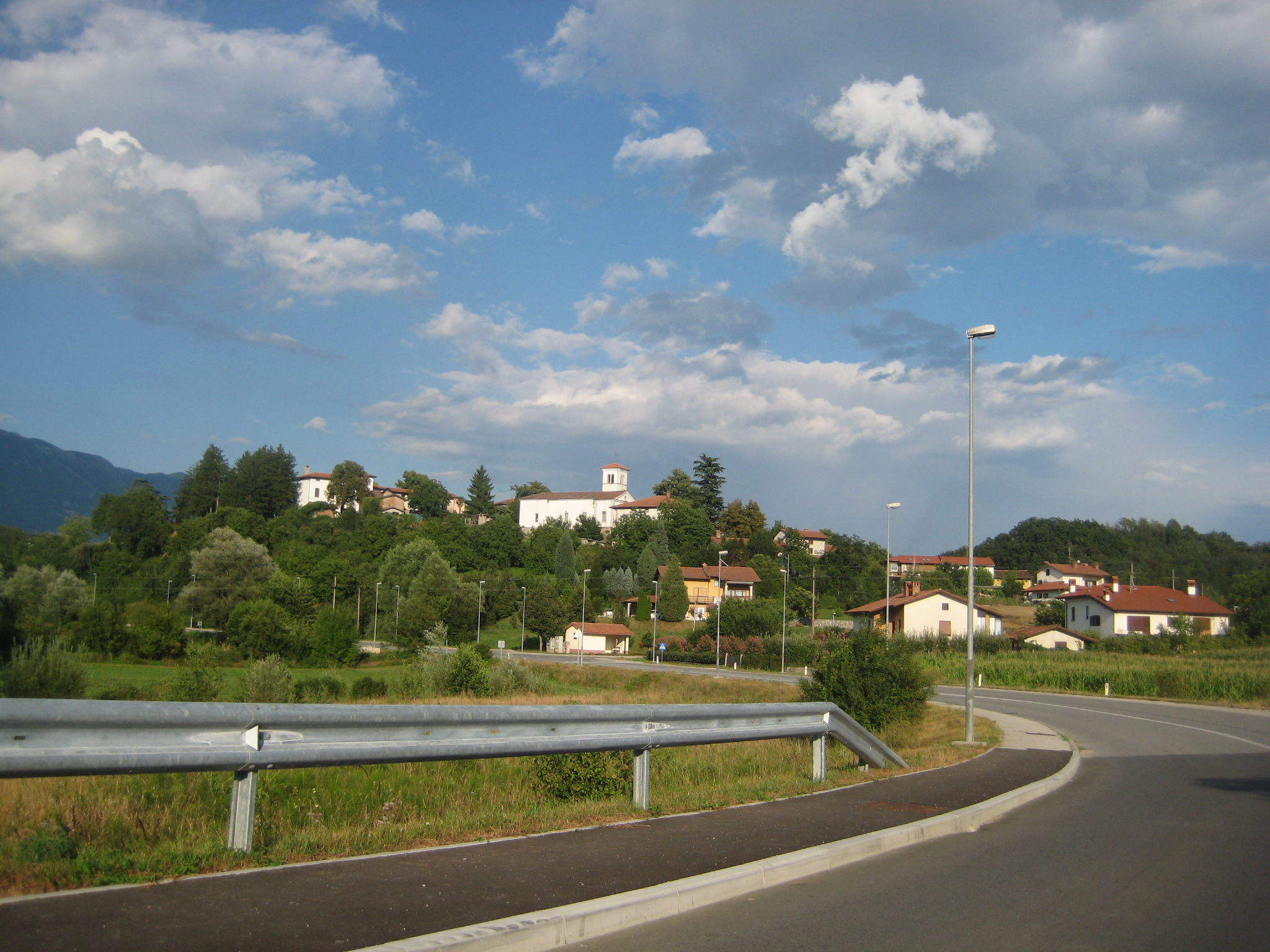

- Location of the Municipality of Renče–Vogrsko in Slovenia
- Coordinates: 45°53′N 13°40′E
- Country: Slovenia

Government
  - Mayor: Tarik Žigon

Area
  - Total: 29.5 km^{2} (11.4 sq mi)

Population (2002)
  - Total: 4,135
  - Density: 140/km^{2} (363/sq mi)
- Time zone: UTC+01 (CET)
  - Summer (DST): UTC+02 (CEST)

The Municipality of Renče–Vogrsko (pronounced [ˈɾeːntʃɛ ˈʋoːɡəɾskɔ]; Slovene: Občina Renče - Vogrsko, Italian: Comune di Ranziano-Voghersca) is a municipality in the Goriška region of Slovenia. It was created in 2006, when it split from the City Municipality of Nova Gorica. The seat of the municipality is the village of Bukovica.

== Settlements ==
In addition to the municipal seat of Bukovica, the municipality also includes the following settlements:

- Dombrava
- Oševljek
- Renče
- Vogrsko
- Volčja Draga
