= List of Slovenian artists =

This article is a list of Slovenian artists and architects

== A ==
- France Ahčin (1919–1989) - sculptor
- Zvest Apollonio (1935–2009) - painter and graphic artist
- Anton Ažbe (1862–1905) - painter

== B ==
- Emilija Bucik Razman (1935–2024) - painter and illustrator

== C ==
- Anton Čebej (1722–1774) - painter
- Mihaela Adelgundis Černic (1913–2016) - painter
- Avgust Černigoj (1898–1985) - painter
- Jože Ciuha (1924–2015) - painter, graphic artist and illustrator

== D ==
- Julia Doria - illustrator, painter, writer

== F ==
- Max Fabiani (1865–1962) - architect

== G ==
- Frančiška Giacomelli Gantar (1905–1988) - bobbin lacemaker, drafter, designer
- Ivan Grohar (1867–1911) - painter.
- Franc Grom
- Herman Gvardjančič (b. 1943) - painter.

== I ==
- Aleksa Ivanc Olivieri (1916–2010) - painter, graphic designer, art restorer

== J ==
- Stane Jagodič (b. 1943) - painter, graphic artist, montager and illustrator
- Božidar Jakac (1899–1989) - painter, graphic artist and illustrator
- Rihard Jakopič (1869–1943) - painter
- Matija Jama (1872–1947) - painter
- Mara Jeraj Kralj (1909–2010) - painter, sculptor, ceramist and puppet maker

== K ==
- Alenka Kham Pičman (1932–2025) - architect, painter, graphic artist and industrial designer
- Boris Kobe (1905–1981) - architect and painter
- Ivana Kobilca (1861–1926) - painter
- Gojmir Anton Kos (1896-1970) - painter
- Tone Kralj (1900–1975) - painter
- Juta Krulc (1913–2015) - landscape architect and artist

== L ==
- Lojze Logar (1944–2014) - painter and graphic artist

== M ==
- Fredy Malec Koschitz(1914–2001) - painter and woodcarver
- Adriana Maraž (1931–2015) - painter and graphic artist
- Julie Martini (1871–1943) - photographer
- France Mihelič (1907–1998) - painter and graphic artist
- Špelca Mladič (1894–1981) - painter and designer
- Pino Mlakar (1907–2006) - ballet dancer and choreographer
- Marko Modic (b. 1958) - photographer, painter and visual artist
- Miki Muster (1925–2018) - illustrator
- Marko Mušič (b. 1941) - architect
- Zoran Mušič (1909–2005) - painter

== O ==
- Lidija Osterc (1928–2006) - painter and illustrator

== P ==
- Justina Hermina Pacek (1931–2016) - nurse, photographer
- Micka Pavlič (1821–1891) - folk artist
- Leopoldina Pelhan (1880–1947) - bobbin lacemaker, bobbin lacemaker teacher, draftswoman and designer
- Slavko Pengov (1908–1966) - painter
- Tomaž Perko (b. 1947) - painter
- Veno Pilon (1896–1970) - painter
- Mira Pintar (1891–1980) - artist and art collector
- Štefan Planinc (1925-2017) - painter, graphic artist and illustrator
- Jože Plečnik (1872–1957) - architect
- Marjetica Potrč (b. 1953) - architect and visual artist
- Marij Pregelj (1913–1967) - painter and illustrator
- Mira Pregelj (1905–1966) - painter

== R ==
- Edo Ravnikar (1907–1993) - architect
- Marija Reven (1882 – after 1945) - bobbin lacemaker teacher, draftswoman and designer
- Jelka Reichman (*1939) - painter and illustrator,
- Miránda Rúmina (?–) - multimedia, painter, writer
- Janez Ravnik, (1929 -) painter, sculptor, professor and art curator
- Jatun Risba intermedia and performance artist

== S ==
- Jakob Savinšek (1922–1961) - sculptor
- Maksim Sedej (1909–1974) - painter
- Savin Sever (1927–2003) - architect
- Matej Sternen (1870–1949) - painter
- Christoph Steidl Porenta (1965–) - silversmith
- Barbara Jožefa Struss (1805–1880) - painter.

== Š ==
- Avgusta Šantel (1876–1968), painter, teacher and printmaker
- Danica Šantel (1887 –1921), teacher, amateur artist and artist's model.
- Henrika Šantel (1874–1940) - painter
- Ive Šubic (1922–1989) - painter
- Vladimir Šubic (1894–1946) - architect

== T ==
- Antonija Thaler - Toni (1914–2014) - bobbin lace maker, draughtswoman and designer
- Jožef Tominc (1790–1866) - painter

== U ==
- Joseph Urbania (1877–1943) - sculptor

== V ==
- Antonija Volk Krebelj (1908–2003), farmer, maker of Suhorje Easter eggs, and folk artist
- Ivan Vurnik (1884–1971) - architect and town planner

== See also ==
- List of painters
- List of sculptors
- List of people by nationality
- List of people by occupation
