= List of Slovenian painters =

A list of notable painters from Slovenia:

== A ==
- Zvest Apollonio
- Anton Ažbe

== B ==
- Milko Bambič
- Bogdan Borčić
- Emilija Bucik Razman

== C ==
- Anton Čebej
- Mihaela Adelgundis Černic
- Avgust Černigoj
- Jože Ciuha

== E ==
- Josip Egartner

== G ==
- Maksim Gaspari
- Ivan Grohar
- Herman Gvardjančič

== I ==
- Tjaša Iris
- Aleksa Ivanc Olivieri

== J ==
- Stane Jagodič
- Božidar Jakac
- Rihard Jakopič
- Matija Jama
- Jernej of Loka

== K ==
- Franz Caucig
- Irena Kazazić
- Ivana Kobilca
- Anton Gojmir Kos
- Tone Kralj

== L ==
- Lojze Logar

== M ==
- Fredy Malec Koschitz
- Adriana Maraž
- France Mihelič
- Zoran Mušič
- Marko Modic

== P ==
- Micka Pavlič
- Slobodan Pejić
- Slavko Pengov
- Veno Pilon
- Mira Pintar
- Štefan Planinc
- Marij Pregelj

== S ==
- Barbara Jožefa Struss
- Maksim Sedej
- Evgen Sajovic
- Rudi Španzel
- Matej Sternen
- Michael Stroy
- Ive Šubic

== T ==
- Ambroz Testen
- Ante Trstenjak
- Marko Tušek
- Jožef Tominc
