= List of Slovenian women artists =

This is a list of women artists who were born in Slovenia or whose artworks are closely associated with that country.

== B ==
- Beti Bricelj (born 1974), painter
- Suzana Bricelj (born 1971), painter, illustrator
- Emilija Bucik Razman (1935–2024), painter and illustrator

== C ==
- Mihaela Adelgundis Černic (1913–2016), painter and painting teacher

== D ==
- Julia Doria (active since 2004), writer, illustrator

== G ==
- Alenka Gerlovič (1919–2010), painter
- Frančiška Giacomelli Gantar (1905–1988), bobbin lacemaker, drafter, designer
- Jelka Godec Schmidt (born 1958), illustrator, children's writer
- Ančka Gošnik Godec (born 1927), illustrator, children's writer
- Tjaša Iris (born 1968), painter

== I ==
- Aleksa Ivanc Olivieri (1916–2010) - painter, graphic designer, art restorer

== J ==
- Marjanca Jemec Božič (born 1928), illustrator

== K ==
- Irena Kazazić (born 1972), painter, writer
- Ivana Kobilca (1861–1926), prominent Slovene painter
- Juta Krulc (1913–2015), landscape architect and artist

== M ==
- Fredy Malec Koschitz(1914–2001), painter and woodcarver
- Adriana Maraž (1931–2015), graphic artist
- Julie Martini (1871–1943), photographer
- Neža Ema Mikec (1877– 1967), embroiderer
- Špelca Mladič (1894–1981), painter and designer

== N ==
- Lela B. Njatin (born 1963), writer, visual artist

== O ==
- Mojca Osojnik (born 1970), painter, illustrator
- Lidija Osterc (1928–2006), painter, illustrator

== P ==
- Justina Hermina Pacek (1931–2016), nurse, photographer, painter, illustrator
- Micka Pavlič (1821–1891), folk painter and carver
- Leopoldina Pelhan (1880–1947) - bobbin lacemaker, bobbin lacemaker teacher, draftswoman and designer
- Mira Pintar (1891–1980), artist, and art collector
- Roža Piščanec (1923–2006), painter, illustrator
- Cita Potokar (1915–1993), painter, illustrator
- Marjetica Potrč (born 1953), artist, architect
- Lila Prap (born 1955), illustrator

== R ==
- Jelka Reichman (born 1939), painter, illustrator
- Miranda Rumina (active since 1980s), multimedia artist, writer

== S ==
- Avgusta Šantel (1876–1968), painter, teacher and printmaker
- Danica Šantel (1887 –1921), teacher, amateur artist and artist's model.
- Henrika Šantel (1874–1940) - painter
- Alenka Sottler (born 1958), painter, illustrator
- Barbara Jožefa Struss (1805–1880) painter and drawing teacher
- Marija Lucija Stupica (1950–2002), illustrator
- Marlenka Stupica (1927–2022), prominent illustrator

== T ==
- Antonija Thaler - Toni (1914–2014) - bobbin lace maker, draughtswoman and designer

== V ==
- Eka Vogelnik (born 1946), illustrator, costume designer, puppeteer
- Kamila Volčanšek (born 1950), painter, illustrator
- Antonija Volk Krebelj (1908–2003), farmer, maker of Suhorje Easter eggs, folk artist
- Melita Vovk (1928–2020), painter, illustrator

== Z ==
- Vlasta Zorko (born 1934), sculptor
