= Jakopič Award =

The Jakopič Award, also known as the Rihard Jakopič Award (Slovene: Jakopičeva nagrada or Nagrada Riharda Jakopiča), is an art award in Slovenia awarded each year for achievements in the fine arts children's literature. It has been bestowed since 1969 by the Ljubljana Academy of Fine Arts and Design, the Museum of Modern Art and the Slovene Fine Artists' Association. It is awarded on 12 April, the anniversary of the birth of the painter Rihard Jakopič after whom it is named.

== Jakopič Award laureates ==
| Year | Recipient |
|---|---|
| 1969 | Marij Pregelj |
| 1970 | Gabrijel Stupica |
| 1971 | Janez Bernik |
| 1972 | Drago Tršar |
| 1973 | Slavko Tihec |
| 1974 | Riko Debenjak |
| 1975 | Andrej Jemec |
| 1976 | Marjan Pogačnik |
| 1977 | Adriana Maraž |
| 1978 | France Mihelič |
| 1979 | Zoran Mušič |
| 1980 | Boris Jesih |
| 1981 | Jože Ciuha, Janez Lenassi |
| 1982 | Bogdan Borčić |
| 1983 | Metka Krašovec |
| 1984 | Štefan Planinc |
| 1985 | Zvest Apollonio |
| 1986 | Zdenko Kalin |
| 1987 | Vladimir Makuc |
| 1988 | France Rotar |
| 1989 | Emerik Bernard |
| 1990 | Herman Gvardjančič |
| 1991 | Zmago Jeraj |
| 1992 | Lujo Vodopivec |
| 1993 | Marjan Tršar |
| 1994 | Lojze Logar |
| 1995 | Rudolf Kotnik |
| 1996 | Gustav Gnamuš |
| 1997 | Valentin Oman |
| 1998 | Živko Marušič |
| 1999 | was not awarded |
| 2000 | Lojze Spacal |
| 2001 | Matjaž Počivavšek |
| 2002 | Zdenko Huzjan |
| 2003 | Marjetica Potrč |
| 2004 | IRWIN group |
| 2005 | Franc Purg |
| 2006 | Bogoslav Kalaš |
| 2007 | Srečo Dragan |
| 2008 | Marko Pogačnik |
| 2009 | Tadej Pogačar |
| 2010 | Berko |
| 2011 | Zmago Lenardič |

== See also ==
- List of European art awards
