= Ive Šubic =

Yugoslav painter, graphic artist and illustrator

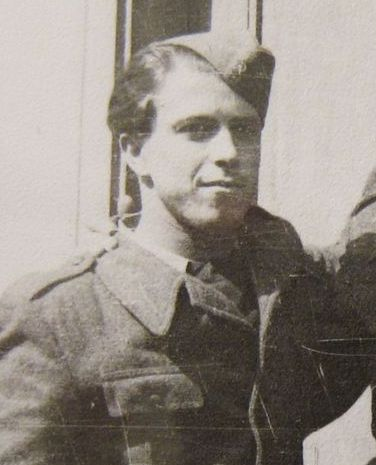
- Born: 23 April 1922; Hotovlja, Slovenia
- Died: 29 December 1989 (aged 67); Škofja Loka, Slovenia
- Education: Academy of Fine Arts, Ljubljana
- Known for: painting, printmaking, illustrating
- Notable work: Paintings, prints, and illustrations
- Awards: Levstik Award; 1949 for Nejček; Levstik Award; 1951 for Kralj Matjaž reši svojo nevesto Levstik Award; 1967 for Jugoslavija with Jože Ciuha; Prešeren Foundation Award; 1968 for his exhibition in the Škofja Loka Museum; Levstik Award; 1969 for Mladost v džungli Levstik Award; 1971 for Kos rženega kruha Grand Prešeren Award; 1979 for his artistic achievements

Ive Šubic (23 April 1922 – 29 December 1989) was a Yugoslav painter, printmaker, and illustrator.

Šubic was born in the village of Hotovlja near Poljane above Škofja Loka in 1922. He enrolled in the Zagreb Academy of Arts in 1940, but his studies were interrupted by the Second World War. He joined the Partisans in 1941 and participated in the Battle of Dražgoše, the monument to which he later participated in designing. After the war he studied at the Academy of Fine Arts in Ljubljana under Gojmir Anton Kos and Božidar Jakac. He graduated in 1948. He is known for his paintings, linocuts and other prints, illustrations, and murals. He died in Škofja Loka in 1989.

In 1968 he won the Prešeren Foundation Award for the exhibition of his art at the Škofja Loka Museum. In 1979 he won the Grand Prešeren Award for his creative achievements. He also won the Levstik Award for his illustrations five times: in 1949, 1951, 1967 (with Jože Ciuha), 1969, and 1971.

The Ive Šubic Art Workshop, held every year in Škofja Loka since 1997, is named after him.

== Selected illustrated works ==
- Uporne Dražgoše (Dražgoše, the Village That Rebelled) by Ivo Zorman, 1978
- Dolga pot (The Long Path) by Kristina Brenk, 1973
- Kos rženega kruha (A Slice of Rye Bread) by Ferdo Godina, 1971
- Mladost v džungli (Youth in the Jungle) by Dhan Gopal Mukerji, 1969
- Tolminski punt (The Peasant Revolt in Tolmin) by France Bevk, 1968
- Spomini na deda in druge zgodbe (Memories of Grandfather and Other Stories) by Josip Jurčič, 1967
- Jugoslavija (Yugoslavia), by France Planina 1967
- Smeh skozi solze (Laughter through Tears) by France Bevk, 1959
- Kralj Matjaž reši svojo nevesto (King Matthias Saves His Bride) by Mile Klopčič, 1951
- Nejček by Zoran Hudales, 1949
