= Herman Gvardjančič =

Slovene painter

- Born: 21 October 1943 (age 82); Gorenja Vas–Reteče at Škofja Loka, Slovenia
- Education: Pedagogical Academy in Ljubljana (1963-64); Painting on the ALUO in Ljubljana (1964/65-1968), MA on the ALUO in Ljubljana(1970)
- Known for: painting, drawing
- Notable work: Hiša samomorilke Silve, 1983; B.N.,1985; Slovenski grb, 25.6.1991
- Awards: Prešeren Award Ljubljana 1981, Grohar award Škofja Loka 1988, Jakopič award Ljubljana 1990
- Website: https://hermangvardjancic.cf

Herman Gvardjančič (born 21 October 1943, in Gorenja vas, Škofja Loka), is a Slovene painter.

== Life ==
Gvardjančič was born in Škofja Loka in Slovenia and was educated at the local primary school. After this he attended the Ljubljana School of Design and later continued painting at the Art Academy in Ljubljana. He finished his studies under Professor Maksim Sedej in 1968 and then specialised under Professor Zoran Didek in 1970. His studies brought him into contact with other famous Slovene painters including France Mihelič, Marij Pregelj and Gabrijel Stupica. After his graduation he continued his studies in Poland and Germany. From 1971 he worked as a teacher in a primary school until in 1987 he began work as a Professor at the Pedagogical Academy in Ljubljana. Since 1997 H. G. has worked as a professor of painting and drawing at the Academy of Fine Arts and Design in Ljubljana. He continues to live in Škofja Loka, the town of his birth.

== Art Work ==
Throughout his life Gvardjančič has proved to be an important contributor to the field of art in all its manifestations. He has helped to decipher the problematic, multi-layered world of painting as it has evolved during his own creative life. His creations are always based on the subject rather than on the abstract. In his opus we recognise that he is a painter of culture and ethics of late modernism and, despite the widespread use of new media, he insists on the expressive power of traditional painting and drawing. He trusts the visual power of his work through which he expresses the existential validity of the subjective experiences of birth, life and death. He manages to capture this with a remarkable sense of balance, composition and integrity to which he also adds his subtle touch. The concluding thought is therefore that from H.G’s works there radiates a primal instinct of the mental state of the artist.

»Gvardjančič’s past and present painting - with its power to restore the foundations of a long nurtured and progressive movement within the permanently adopted and firmly embedded experience - insisted on the artist's strong belief in the expressive power of painting as a permanent historical artistic discipline and also the belief in his own painting, which cooperates with its visibility and participation in an endless world of contemporary art at the crossroads of the 20th and 21st century.« Wrote the art critic Ješa Denegri.

His works are present in several collections in Slovenia and abroad (Karlovac, Sombor, Rijeka, Zagreb, Belgrade, Graz, Kunsan, Lisbon, Hiroshima, Tokyo, Vienna). For his work he received the Prešeren Foundation Award in 1981, the Grohar Award in 1988 and the Jakopič Award in 1990.

In an interview (Art Words No. 81 - 82) H.G.said:

»Being a painter is a way of life. A real artist, having reached his maturity, does not attempt to change that.«

== Important periods, paintings and exhibitions ==
Between 1970 and 1972 (during the pop art movement in Europe and America) Gvardjančič made a series of landscape paintings in the pop art style. This resulted in his paintings entitled: Road, Figure and Landscape. Between 1972 - 1975 Gvardjančič enters a period of photorealism, where he was a broker in their perception of the nature of the use of photography. During this period, significant paintings are:, Southern Sky and Superpanorama.

Between 1975 and 1977 he entered a period of painting entitled »Typical Landscape«. Two major paintings from this period are Dandelion and Shadows. In 1976 he exhibited at the Venice Biennale and in 1977 at the International Fine Arts in Belgrade. In 1978 he exhibited at the 12th Mediterranean Biennale in Alexandria. From 1977 to 1979 he painted the so-called »minimalist landscape«. In 1980 he produced a series of paintings entitled Grasses.

Between 1982 and 1985 resulting from cycles of drawings, paintings and watercolors, he produced In Memoriam, and Reminiscence. In 1983 cycles of drawings and paintings on the theme of House of Suicide Silva, Suicide Silva fence and Intimacy. In 1984 he completed a series of images with a key painting entitled Gray sun.

In 1991 he exhibited at the exhibition Kunst Europa in Siegen. In the same year he drew a picture entitled Solea and Saita (the theme music Miles Davis). In the period 1997 - 2005 he worked under the influence of the music of Nico. In 2008, he had retrospective exhibitions at the International Graphic Centre in Ljubljana, City Art Museum in Ljubljana and in the Gallery of Contemporary Art in Celje. On this occasion, his monograph was also published. Between 2008 - 2010 he painted a series entitled and Sigur Ros (Sigur Rós is a band from Reykjavík).

== Selected artworks ==
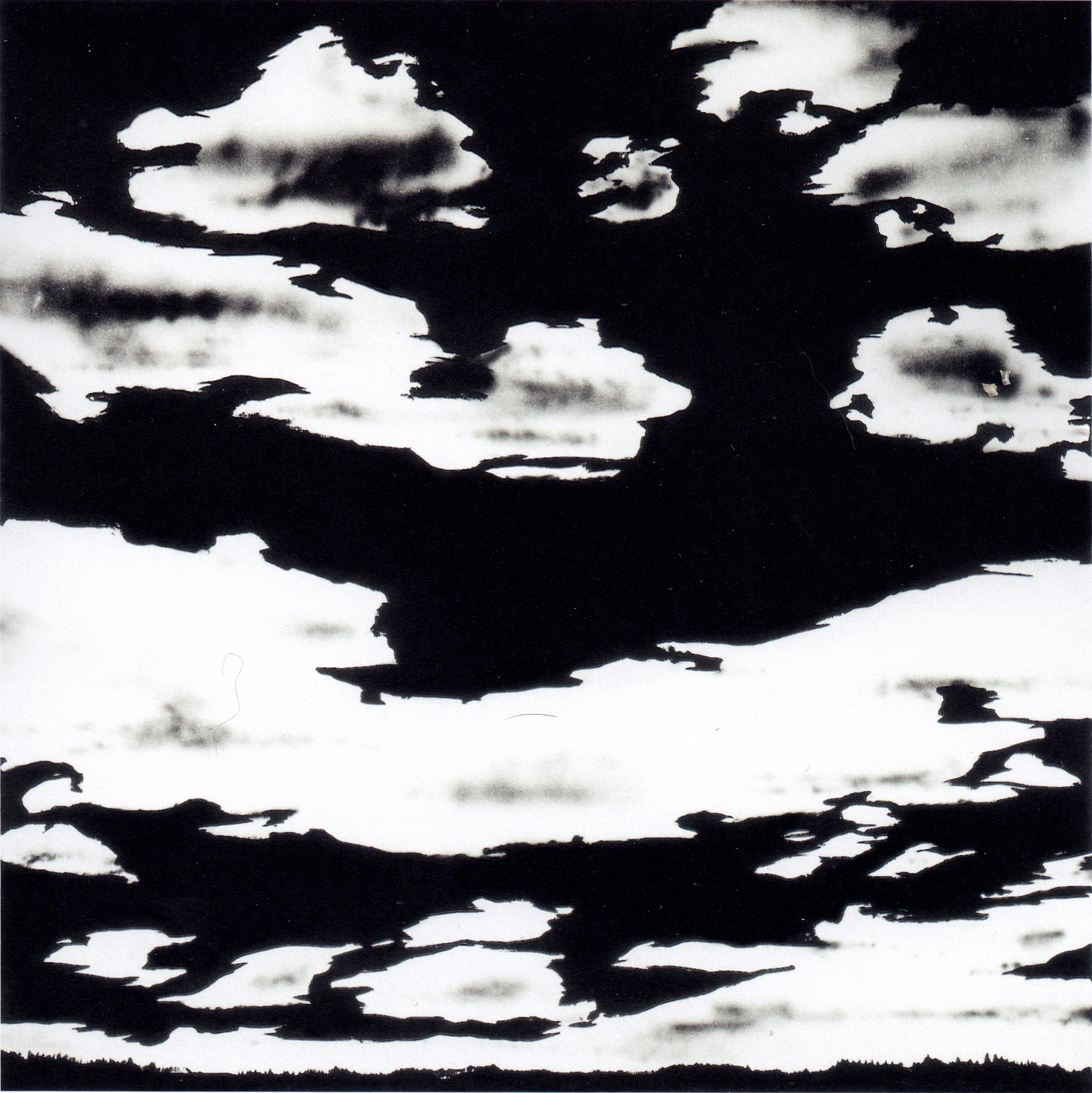
Cumulus, 1973

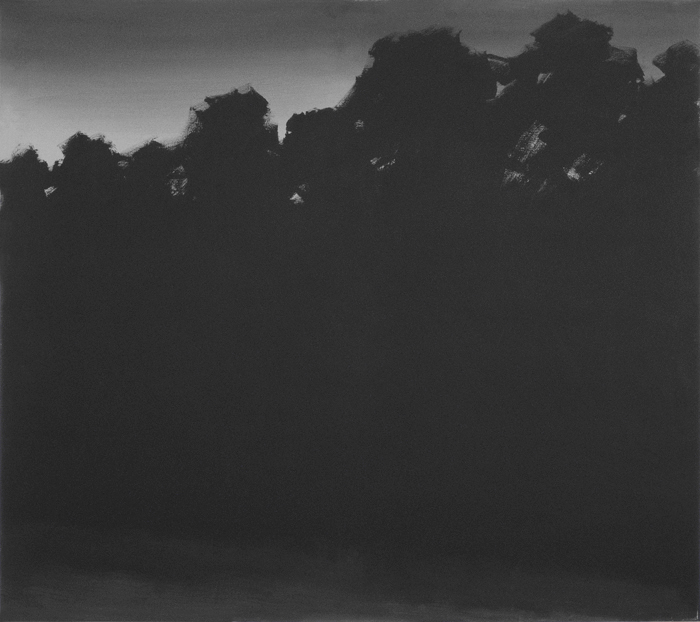
Landscape, 1977

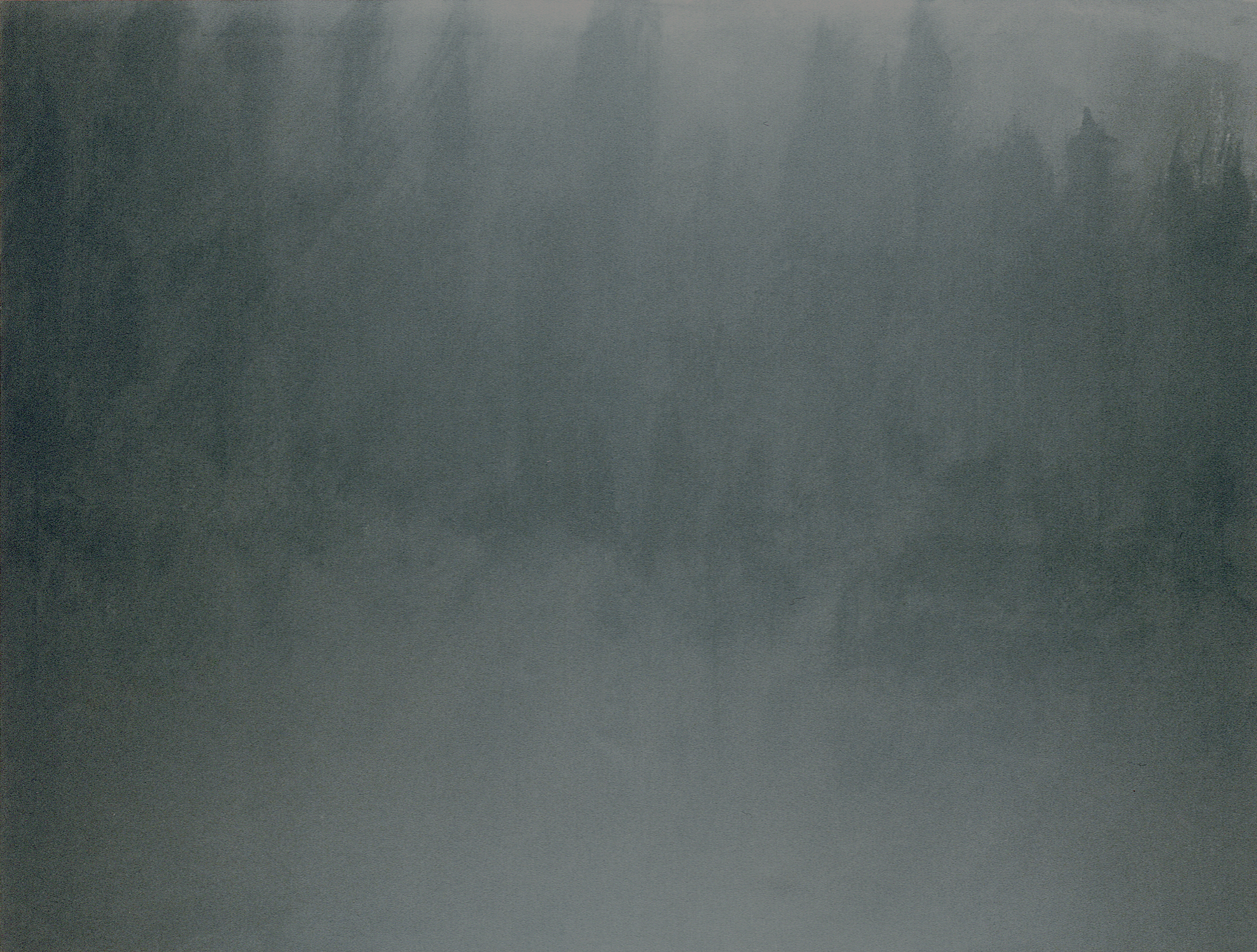
Landscape, 1979

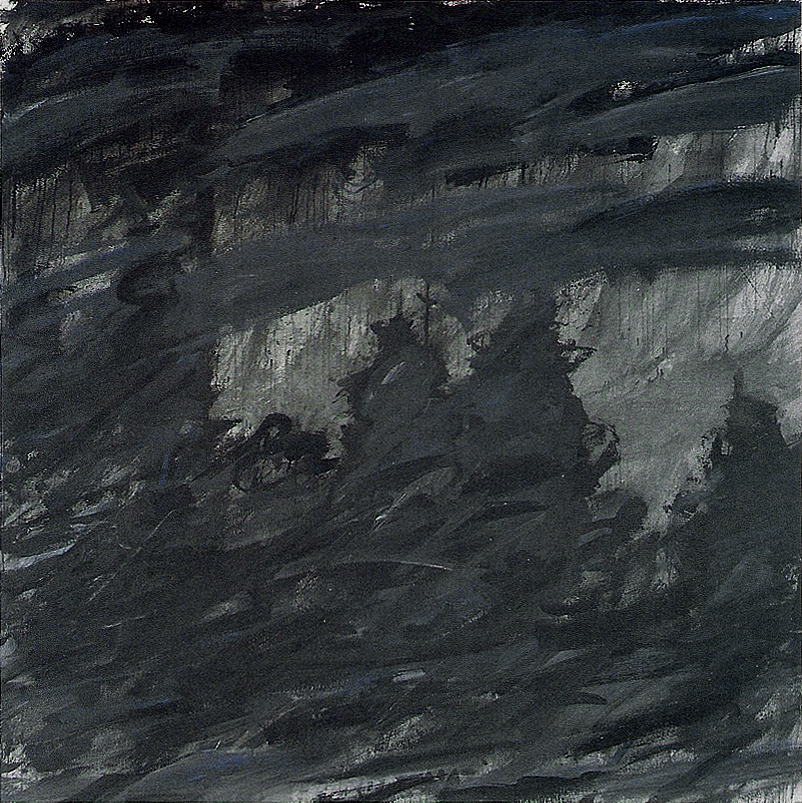
Landscape, 1980

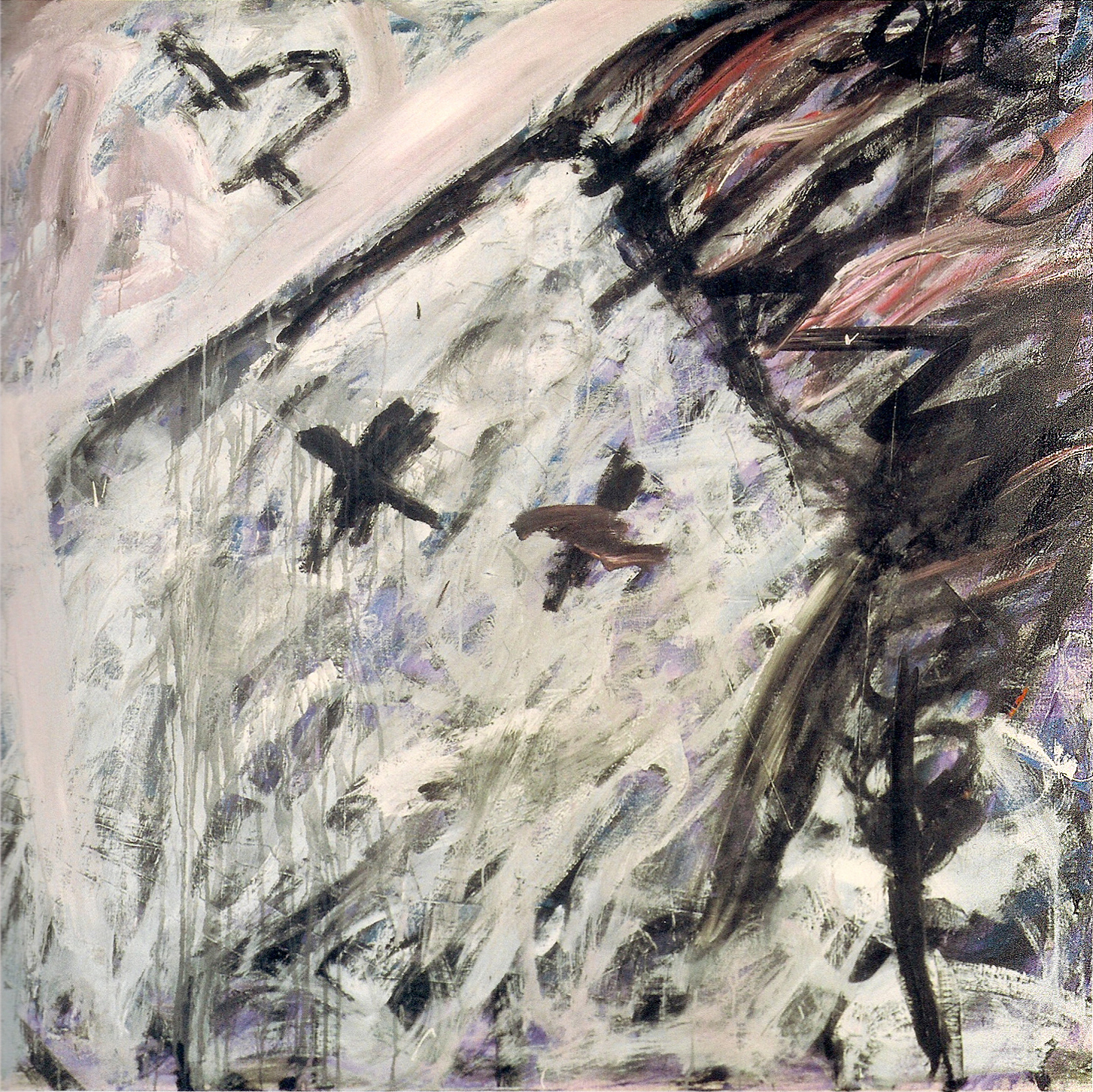
Flying Max, 1984

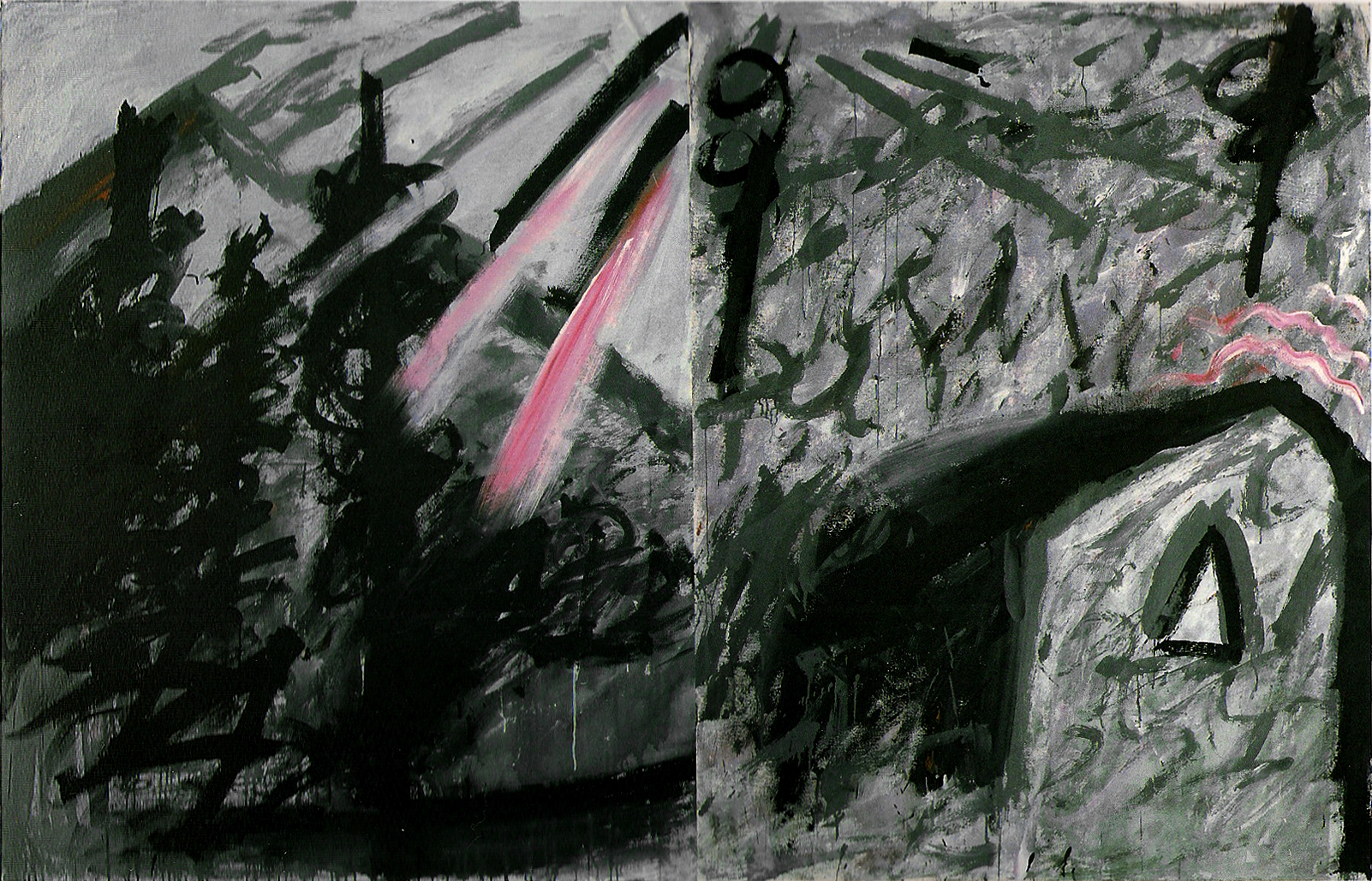
Reminiscence, 1985

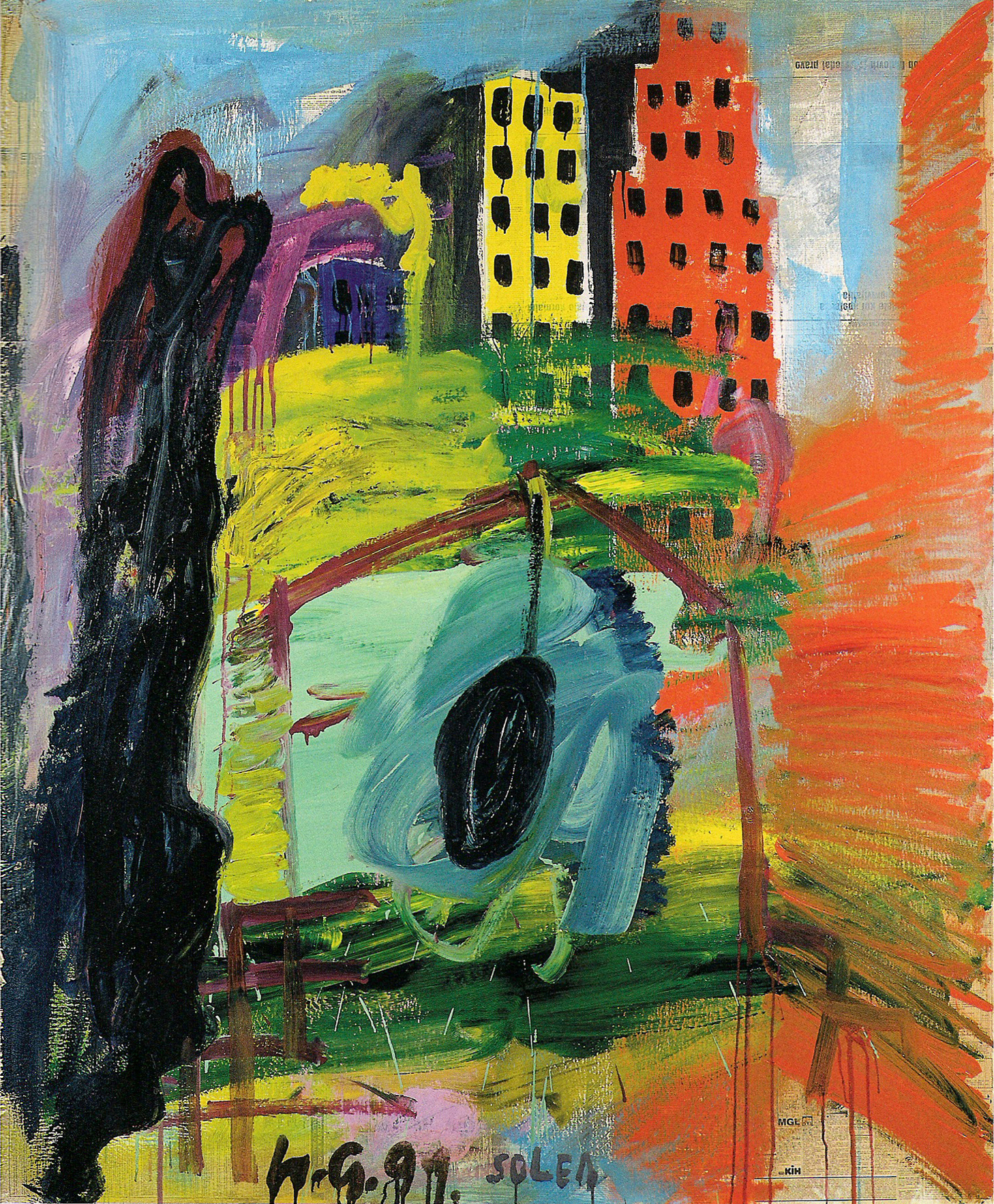
Solea II, 1991

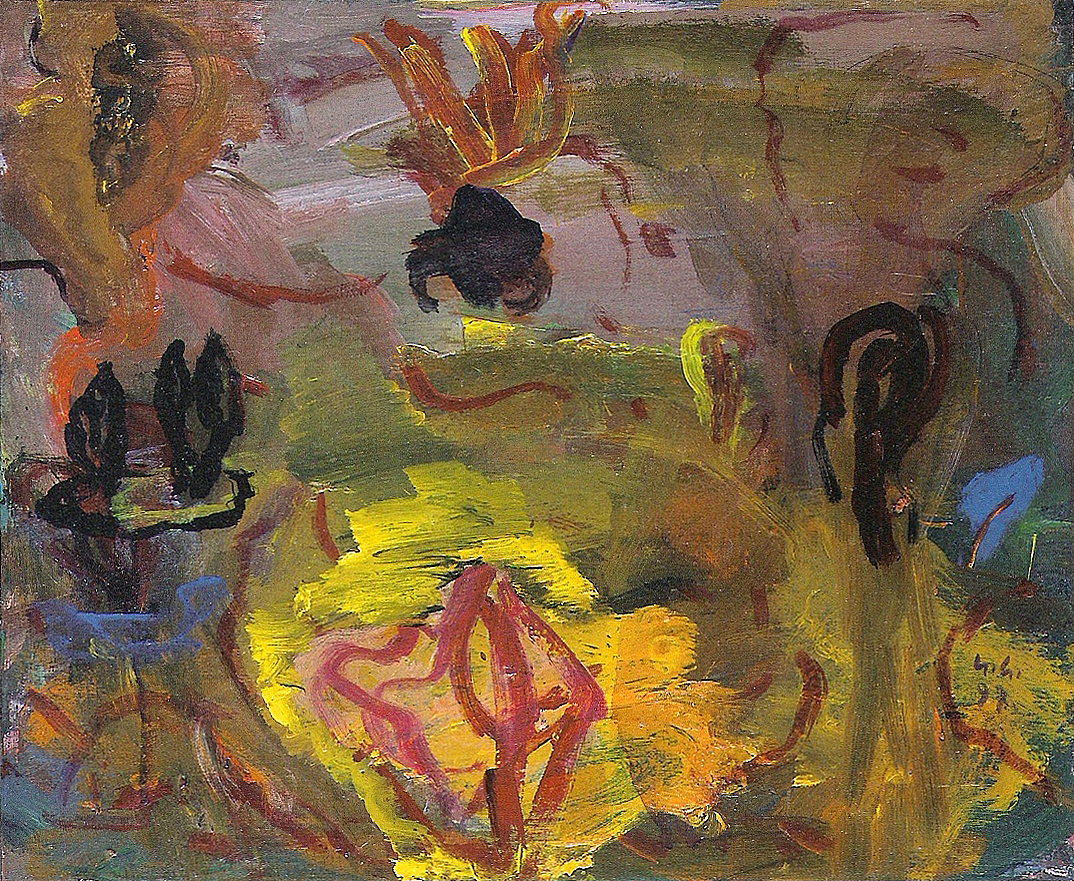
Landscape, 1997

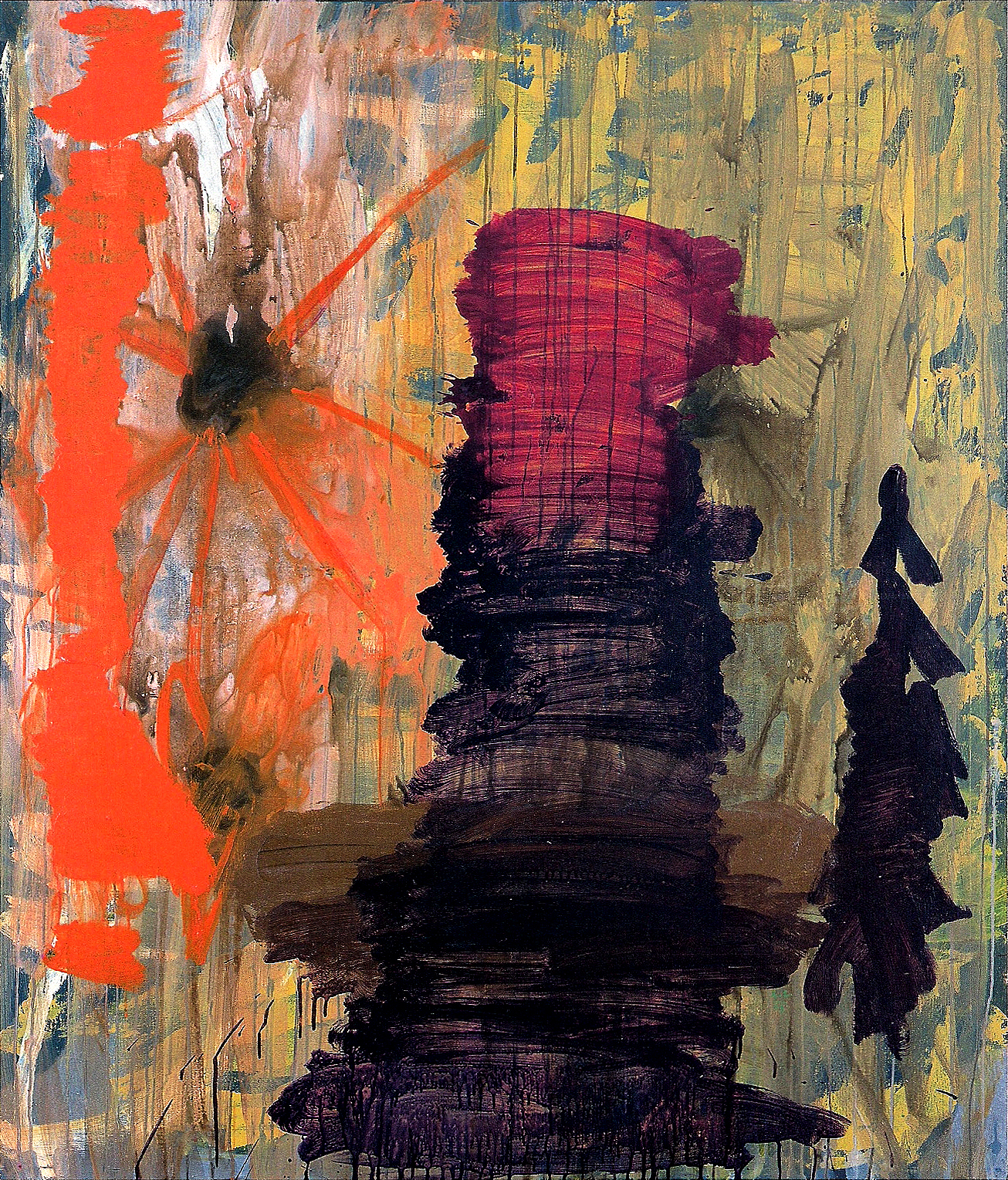
Landscape, 2003

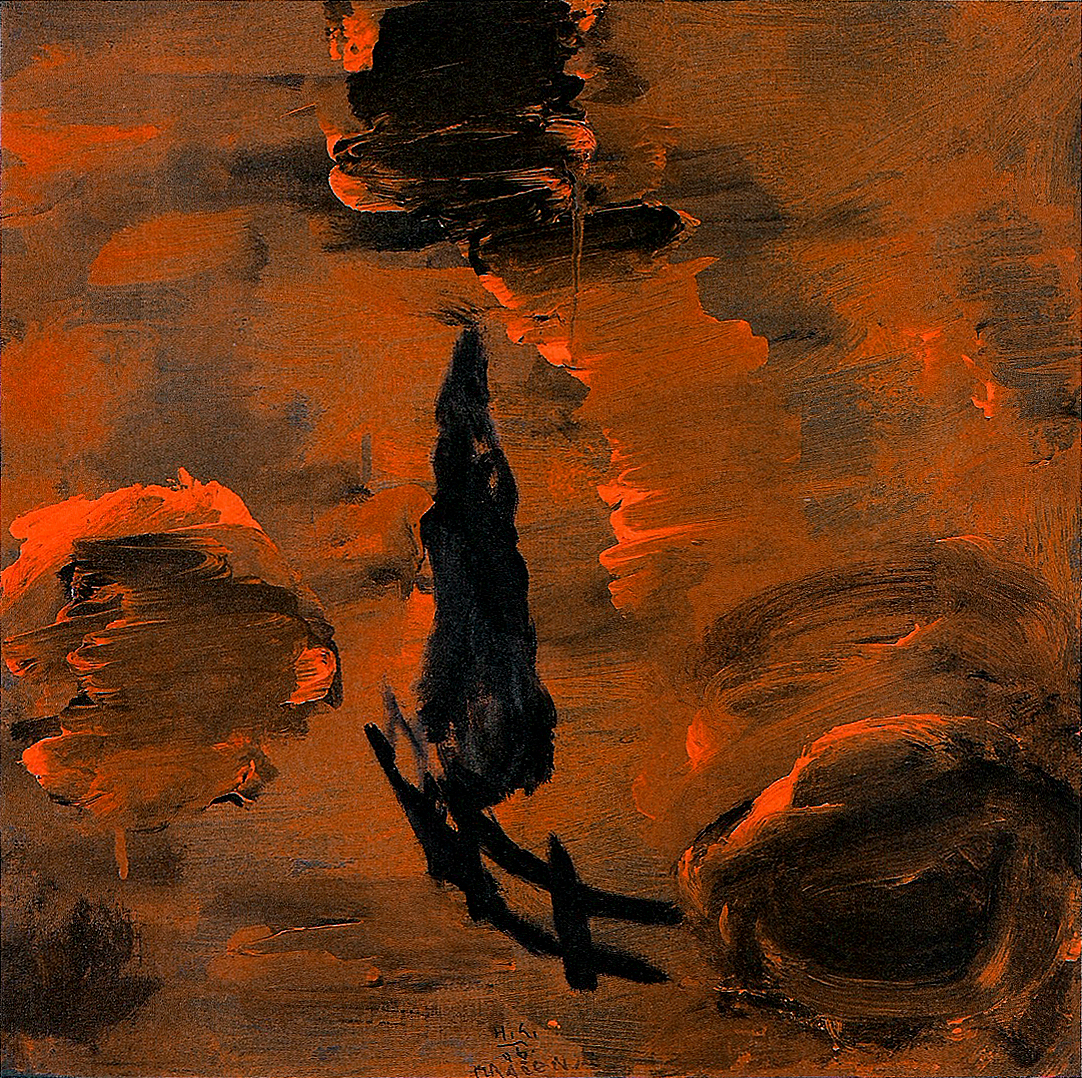
Dimming, 2006

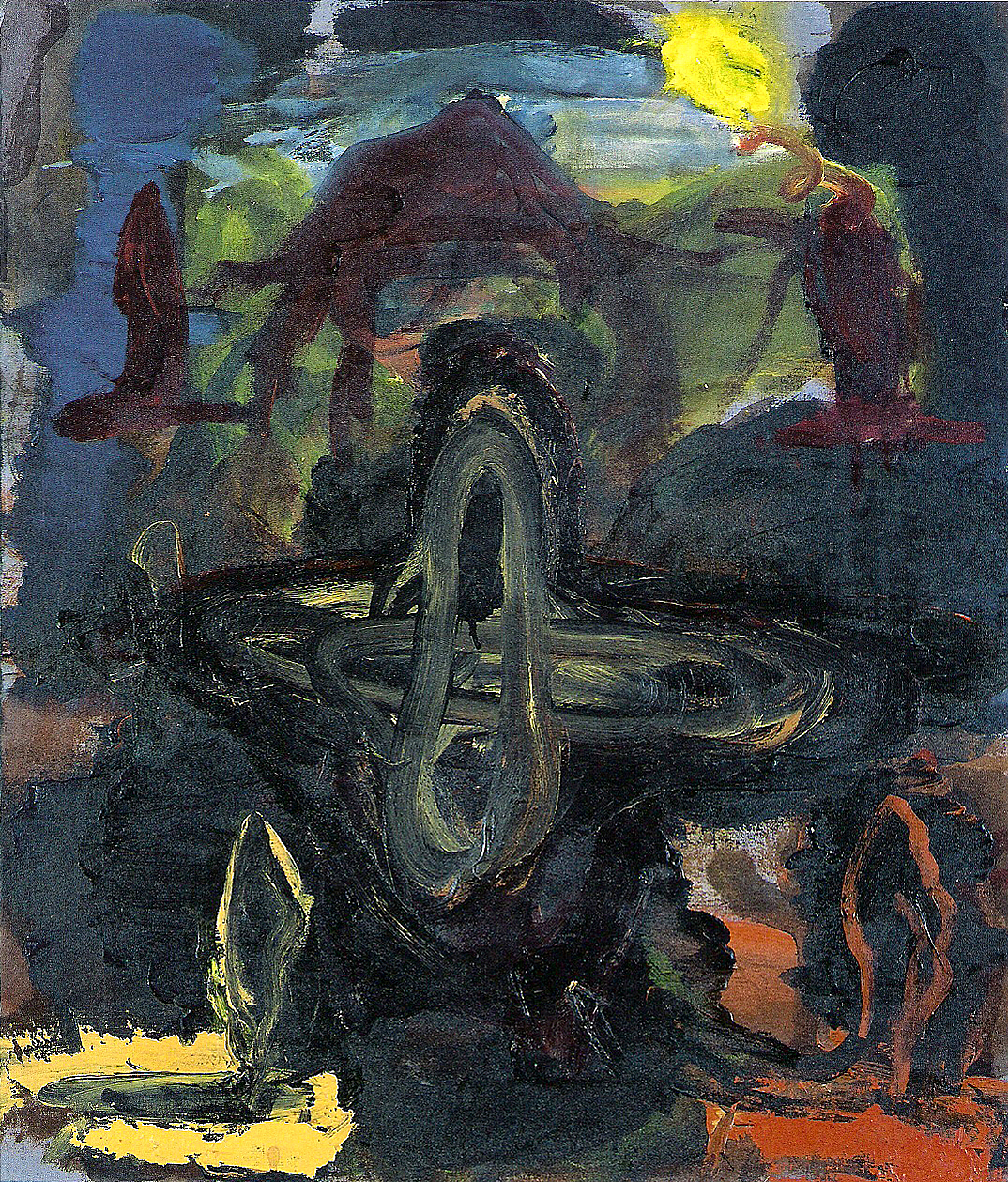
A.L.V.N, 1995 - 2006

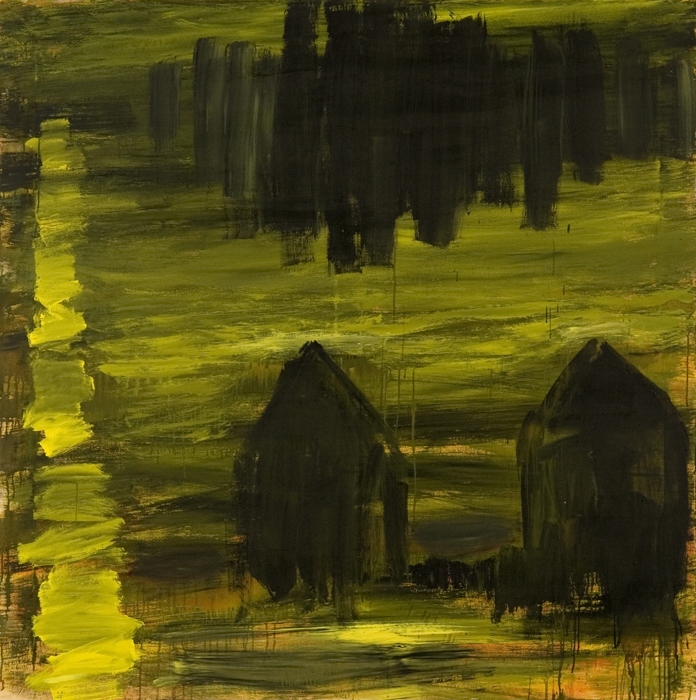
Sigur Ros, 2009

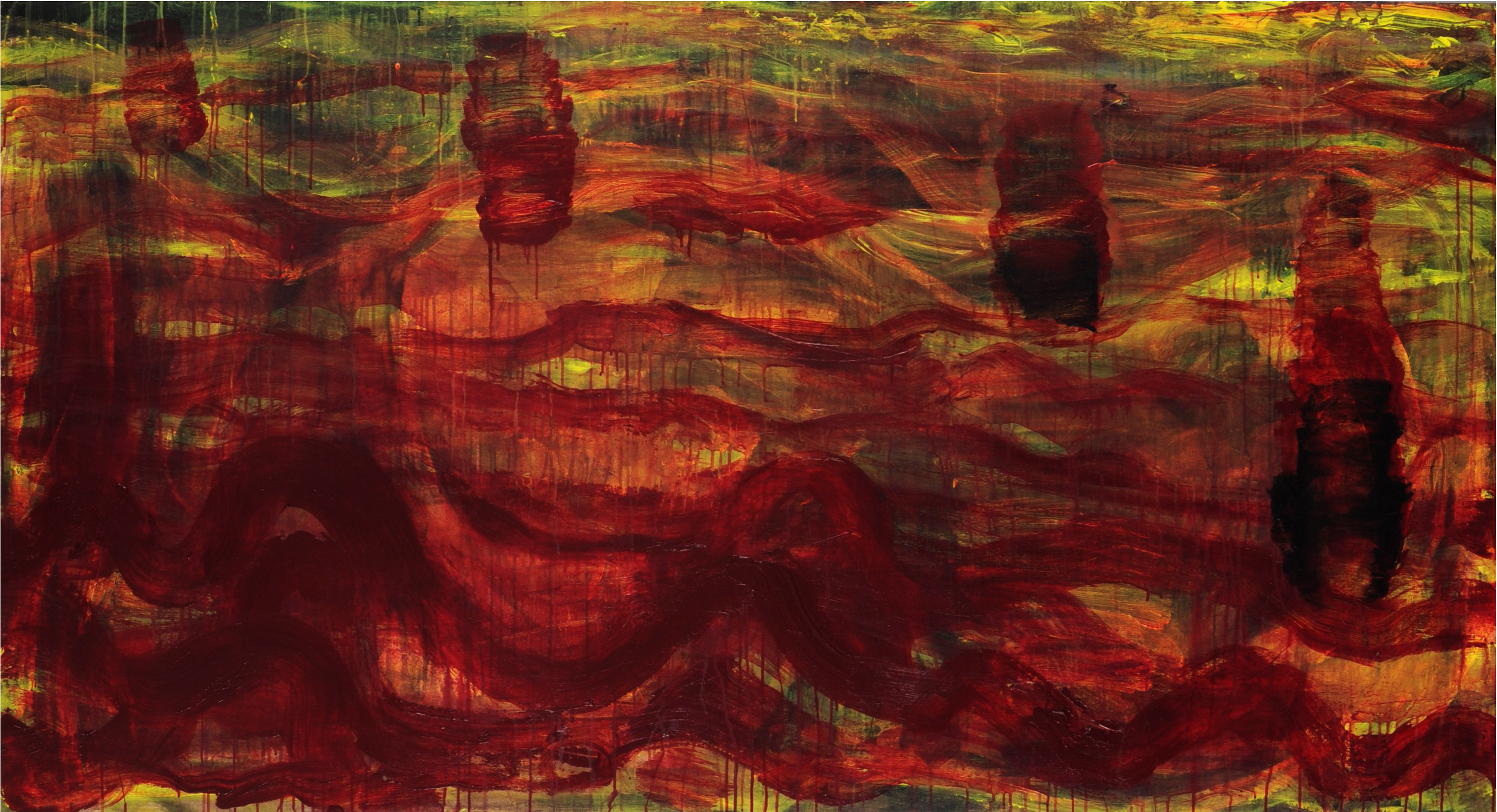
Landscape, 2008 - 2013

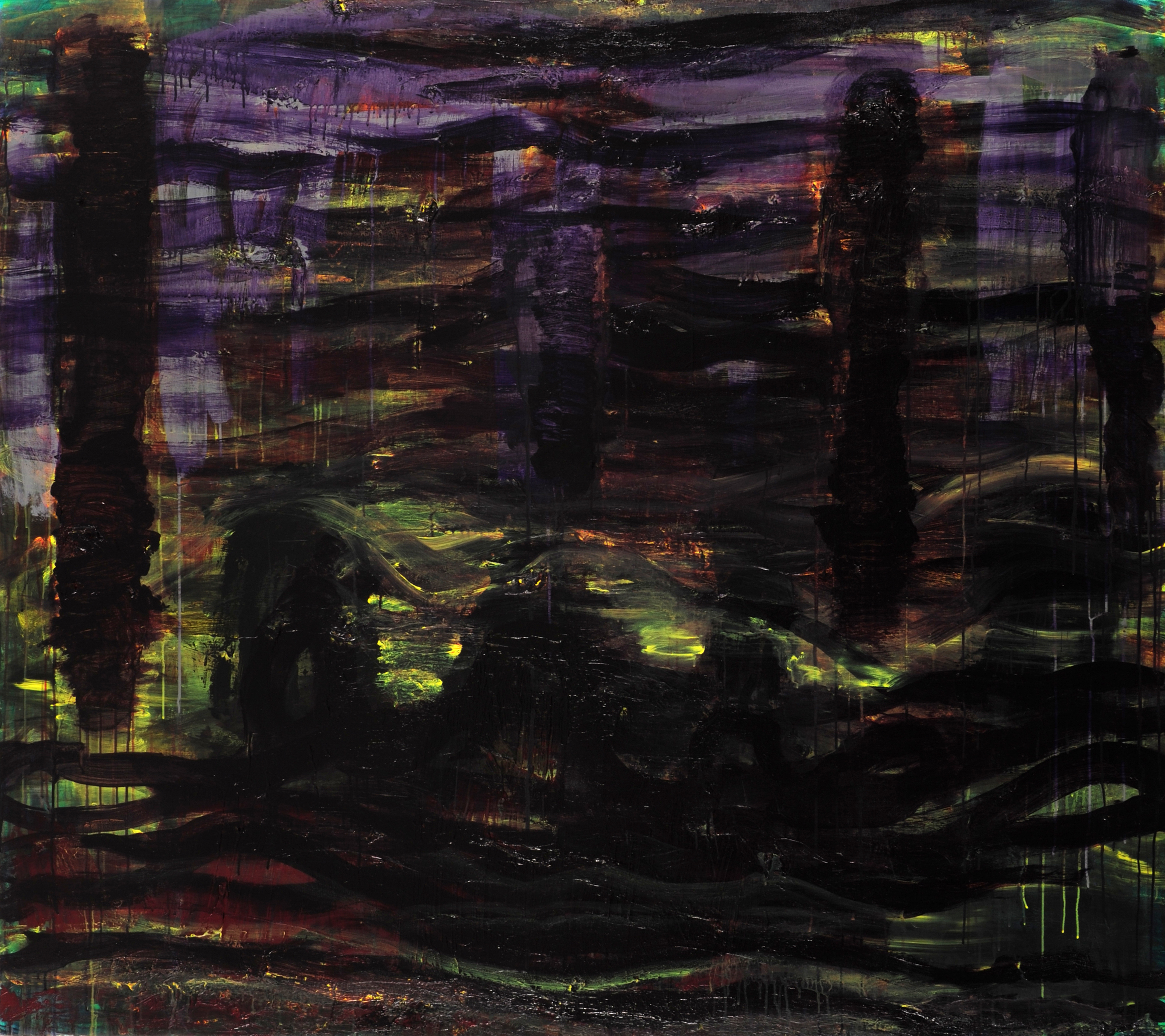
Landscape, 2013

== Solo exhibitions(selection) ==
- 1981, Ljubljana, Mala Galerija
- 1985, Ljubljana, Equrna Gallery
- 1988, Ljubljana, Museum of Modern Art, Ljubljana, retrospective exhibition
- 1998, Ljubljana, Tivoli Castle, Ljubljana/MGLC
- 2008, Ljubljana, Ljubljana city gallery, Tivoli castle, Ljubljana/MGLC, Celje Gallery of Contemporary Art

== Group exhibitions (selection) ==
- 1975, Edinburgh, The Richard Demarco Gallery, aSPECT
- 1976, Venice, Venice Biennale
- 1991, Siegen, Stadtische Galerie Haus Seel, Kunst Evropa
- 2002, Belgrade, Museum of Contemporary Art (Belgrade), Yugoslavias art space 1990–1991
- 2003, Ljubljana, Museum of Modern Art, Ljubljana, Do roba in naprej, Slovene art 1975–1985

== See also ==
- List of Slovenian painters
