= Planinc =

Planinc is a surname. Notable people with the surname include:

- Albin Planinc (1944–2008), Slovenian chess player
- Milka Planinc (1924–2010), Yugoslav politician
- Štefan Planinc (1925–2017), Slovene painter and illustrator
