= L'Île-Rousse =

L'Île-Rousse Lìsula
- Commune
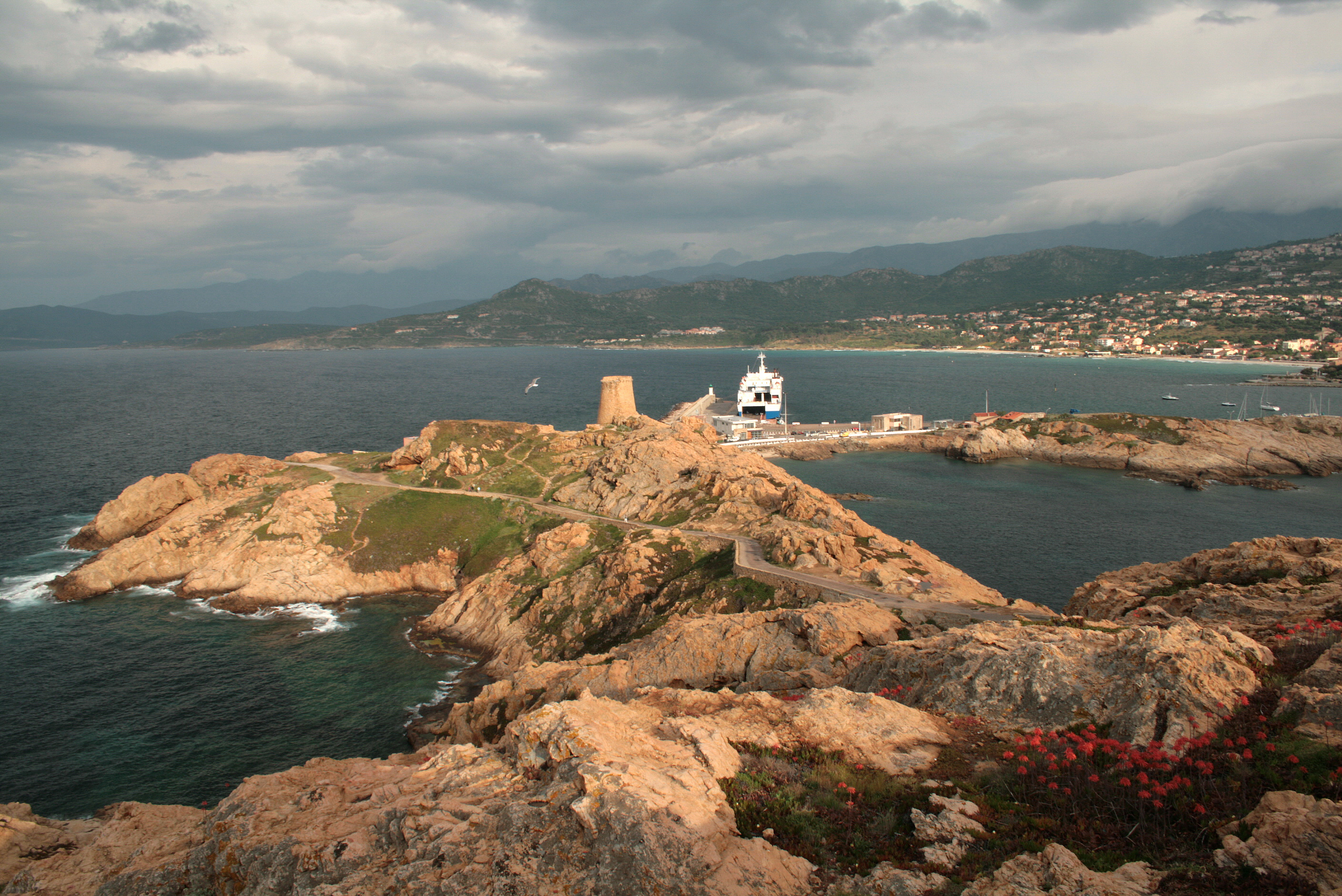
- Port

- Coat of arms
- Location of L'Île-Rousse
- Location within France Location within Corsica
- Coordinates: 42°38′08″N 8°56′17″E
- Country: France
- Region: Corsica
- Department: Haute-Corse
- Arrondissement: Calvi
- Canton: L'Île-Rousse
- Intercommunality: CC de l'Île-Rousse - Balagne

Government
  - Mayor (2020–2026): Angèle Bastiani
- Area^{1}: 2.5 km^{2} (0.97 sq mi)
- Elevation: 15 m (49 ft)
- Highest elevation: 151 m (495 ft)
- Lowest elevation: 0 m (0 ft)
- Population (2023): 3,231
  - Density: 1,300/km^{2} (3,300/sq mi)
- Time zone: UTC+01:00 (CET)
  - Summer (DST): UTC+02:00 (CEST)
- INSEE/Postal code: 2B134 /20220
- ^{1} French Land Register data, which excludes lakes, ponds, glaciers > 1 km^{2} (0.386 sq mi or 247 acres) and river estuaries.

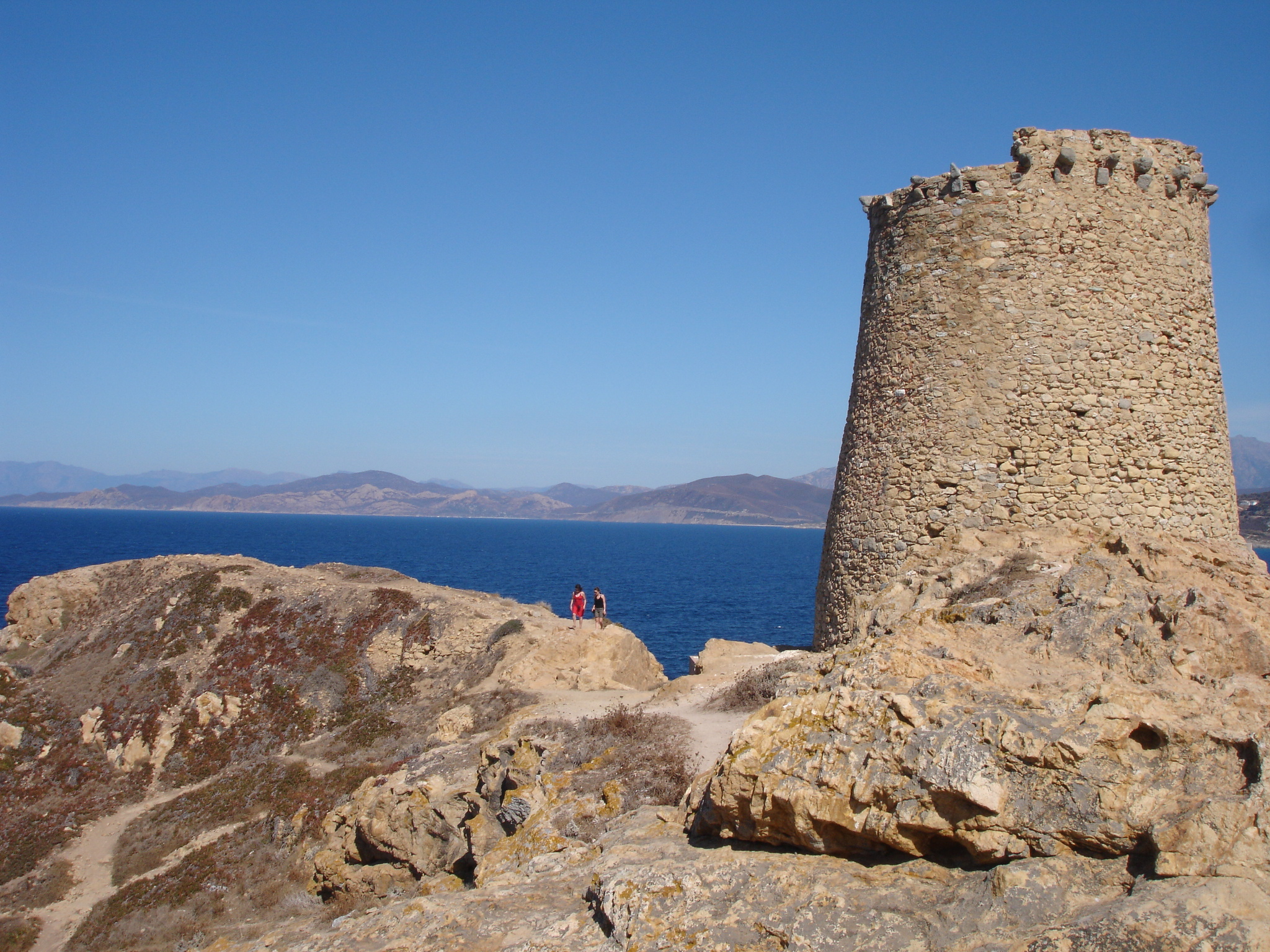
Torra di a Petra

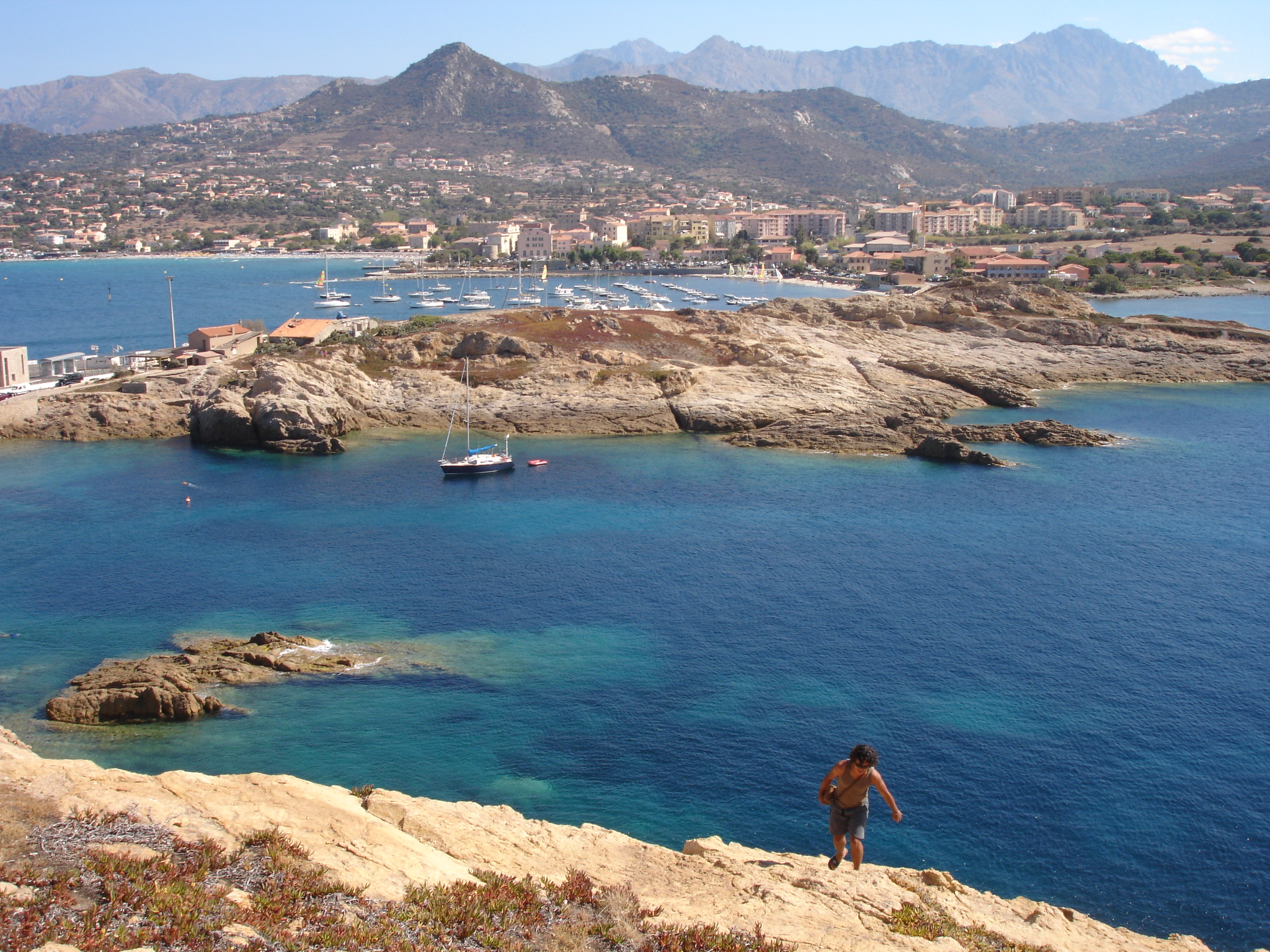
View from the tower

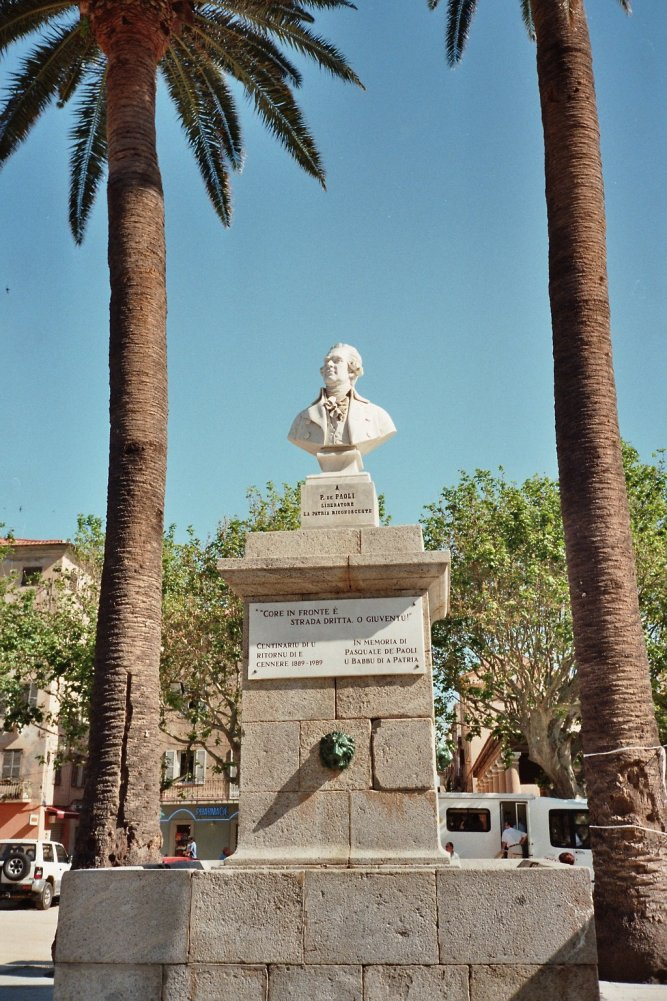
Bust of Pasquale Paoli

L'Île-Rousse (French pronunciation: [lil ʁus]; Corsican: Lìsula, [ˈlizula], or Isula Rossa, [ˈizula ˈrɔssa]; Italian: Isola Rossa, [ˈiːzola ˈrossa]; lit. 'Red Island') is a commune in the Haute-Corse department of France on the island of Corsica.

It was founded in 1758 by Pasquale Paoli to create a port that would not be in the hands of the Genoese (such as Calvi). As Italian was until 1848 the administrative language of Corsica, the town was originally named Isola Rossa (Red Island) from the eponymous reddish color of a rocky islet that served as a natural harbor.

Along with Saint-Florent and Tox, it is one of only three communes in the département to have a French name — all the others have kept their Italian names despite the repeated demands of Corsican nationalists to change the names of all communes to their native Corsican names.

== History ==
Inhabited since very ancient times (between 5000-3000 BC), l'Île-Rousse was in 1000 BC a small, prosperous town called Agilla; it was dependent on Tyre in Phoenicia. Destroyed by the Phoenician fleet of Calaris (Galeria), Agilla came under Roman rule as Rubico Rocega (red rock) until the 4th century AD. Being so close to the sea, it was threatened by pirates and other potential enemies, and was not inhabited for several centuries except for fishermen and peasants who lived on the products of the sea and earth around the villages of Santa Reparata and Monticello.

In the 17th century, merchants from Santa-Reparata-di-Balagna established shops to trade by sea with the coastal villages of the Balagne, Nebbio, and the west of the Cap Corse. About 1759, Pasquale Paoli, who often came to Balagne, decided to equip Corsica with a port in the northwest of the island to try to cut the sea traffic between Genoa and Calvi. His plans prepared, he persuaded the Balagne government, sitting in Algajola, to authorize him to create a fort protecting the port (the Scalu) on 10 December 1765. L’Île-Rousse was born from this decision.

== Climate ==
L'Île-Rousse has a cold semi-arid climate (Köppen climate classification BSk) closely bordering on a hot-summer mediterranean climate (Köppen climate classification Csa). The average annual temperature in L'Île-Rousse is 16.9 °C (62.4 °F). The average annual rainfall is 473.8 mm (18.65 in) with November as the wettest month. The temperatures are highest on average in August, at around 24.9 °C (76.8 °F), and lowest in February, at around 10.4 °C (50.7 °F). The highest temperature ever recorded in L'Île-Rousse was 39.6 °C (103.3 °F) on 5 July 1993; the coldest temperature ever recorded was −1.3 °C (29.7 °F) on 28 December 1996.

Climate data for L'Île-Rousse (1991–2020 averages, extremes 1988–present)
Month	Jan	Feb	Mar	Apr	May	Jun	Jul	Aug	Sep	Oct	Nov	Dec	Year
Record high °C (°F)	20.8 (69.4)	22.2 (72.0)	27.9 (82.2)	29.3 (84.7)	32.2 (90.0)	36.7 (98.1)	39.6 (103.3)	36.9 (98.4)	35.2 (95.4)	31.3 (88.3)	25.9 (78.6)	25.2 (77.4)	39.6 (103.3)
Mean daily maximum °C (°F)	12.8 (55.0)	12.9 (55.2)	14.9 (58.8)	17.4 (63.3)	21.2 (70.2)	25.0 (77.0)	27.6 (81.7)	27.9 (82.2)	24.6 (76.3)	21.1 (70.0)	16.9 (62.4)	13.9 (57.0)	19.7 (67.5)
Daily mean °C (°F)	10.6 (51.1)	10.4 (50.7)	12.2 (54.0)	14.5 (58.1)	18.1 (64.6)	21.8 (71.2)	24.5 (76.1)	24.9 (76.8)	21.7 (71.1)	18.5 (65.3)	14.5 (58.1)	11.7 (53.1)	16.9 (62.4)
Mean daily minimum °C (°F)	8.4 (47.1)	7.9 (46.2)	9.5 (49.1)	11.5 (52.7)	15.0 (59.0)	18.6 (65.5)	21.4 (70.5)	21.9 (71.4)	18.8 (65.8)	15.9 (60.6)	12.2 (54.0)	9.5 (49.1)	14.2 (57.6)
Record low °C (°F)	−1.0 (30.2)	−0.9 (30.4)	−1.1 (30.0)	2.5 (36.5)	5.6 (42.1)	9.1 (48.4)	13.0 (55.4)	14.8 (58.6)	10.8 (51.4)	4.7 (40.5)	1.1 (34.0)	−1.3 (29.7)	−1.3 (29.7)
Average precipitation mm (inches)	34.0 (1.34)	32.7 (1.29)	42.9 (1.69)	39.9 (1.57)	30.2 (1.19)	29.8 (1.17)	7.1 (0.28)	13.5 (0.53)	43.7 (1.72)	60.6 (2.39)	85.5 (3.37)	53.9 (2.12)	473.8 (18.65)
Average precipitation days (≥ 1.0 mm)	5.6	5.5	5.8	5.9	4.3	2.9	0.8	1.4	4.7	6.5	8.5	6.3	58.2
Source: Meteo France

== Description ==
Built on a bay bounded to the north-west by the rocky islets of red porphyry which give it its name, and to the south by a white sand beach, extending westwards from the sea to the hill of the Sémaphore and the col de Fogata.

The old town of Pascal Paoli, le Père de la Patrie (the Father of the Fatherland), is made up of paved streets, almost rectilinear and oriented north-south. From the quays of the commercial port installed on 3 of the 6 small islands, the fishing port and the bridges which link the harbor complex to the coast and the market with its twenty one columns, the fortifications and the houses of the old city grew over the years, from 1765 into the first half of the 19th century.

Certain houses with their interior Florentine staircases are remarkable. The first church built in 1740 and destroyed in 1936 gave its name to the rue Notre-Dame. The church dedicated to Notre Dame de Miséricorde is next to an old Franciscan convent, while the parish church of l’Île-Rousse, the Immaculée Conception de Marie, is on the west of the main square, with its enormous date palms (planted 1890) in the shade of which it is good to play a game of pétanque.

The new town blends harmoniously with the old at the place Paoli, shaded by hundred year old plane trees, where it is good to take the summer air. The old town offers visitors the chance to stroll on the old paving stones, partly restored, along streets with historic names: Pasquale Paoli, Napoleon, les frères Arena (Arena brothers), Louis Philippe, Agilla..

l’Île-Rousse is a popular town with tourists, in part due to its history in Corsica: it was built by Pascal Paoli. After 1815, it was equipped by its municipal officials with a blazon decorated with the royal fleur-de-lis of France. It was then run for a half-century by elected Bonapartist officials.

== Population ==
Historical population
Year	Pop.	±% p.a.
1968	2,036	—
1975	2,360	+2.13%
1982	2,632	+1.57%
1990	2,288	−1.74%
1999	2,774	+2.16%
2007	2,765	−0.04%
2012	3,740	+6.23%
2017	3,043	−4.04%
2023	3,231	+1.00%
Source: INSEE

== Notable people ==
- Pasquale Paoli
- Battista Acquaviva
- Aleksa Ivanc Olivieri (1916–2010), Slovenian painter, graphic designer and art restorer, who lived and worked in France

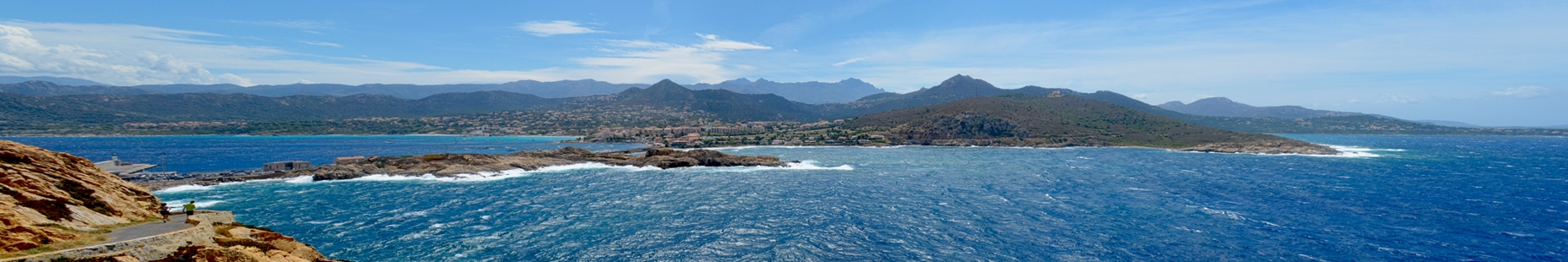
Panoramic view from Pietra lighthouse

== See also ==
- Communes of the Haute-Corse department
