= Slavko Pengov =

Slovene painter

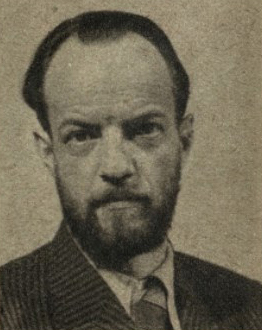
- Pengov, c. 1945
- Born: Vladislav Pengov; 24 June 1908; Ljubljana, Slovenia
- Died: 6 January 1966 (aged 57); Ljubljana, Slovenia
- Education: Academy of Fine Arts, Zagreb Academy of Fine Arts Vienna
- Known for: painting
- Notable work: Painting, murals and illustration
- Awards: Levstik Award; 1951 for Pod svobodnim soncem Prešeren Award; 1959 for his frescos in the National Assembly Building

Slavko Pengov (24 June 1908 – 6 January 1966) was a Slovene painter best known for his monumental opus of murals such as those in the National Assembly Building in Ljubljana and the Parish Church of Saint Martin in Bled.

Pengov was born in Ljubljana in 1908 and baptized Vladislav Pengov. He studied art at the Zagreb Academy of Fine Arts and the Academy of Fine Arts Vienna. From 1945 he taught at the Academy of Arts in Ljubljana.

He also illustrated a number of books and won the Levstik Award in 1951 for his illustrations of Fran Saleški Finžgar's book Pod svobodnim soncem (Under A Free Sun).

He taught painting to Aleksa Ivanc Olivieri.

In 1959 he received the Prešeren Award for his murals on the history of Slovenes in the National Assembly Building in Ljubljana.
