= Zvest Apollonio =

Slovenian artist (1935–2009)

Apollonio Zvest
- Born: May 15, 1935; Capodistria
- Died: March 25, 2009; Bertoki
- Known for: Painting

Zvest Apollonio (15 May 1935, in Capodistria – 25 March 2009, in Bertoki) was a Slovenian painter and scenographer.

== Biography ==
Apollonio was born of an Italian father and a Slovenian mother and grew up bilingually. He entered the Ljubljana Academy of Fine Arts in 1960 where he studied under Gabrijel Stupica. He was a professor at the graphic arts department at the Academy from 1973 to 1989. He was also head of the graphics department and Associate Dean for four years. He is considered one of the most important Slovenian artists of the late 20th and early 21st centuries, and was a recipient in 1984 of the Jakopič Award, the highest award for the arts in Slovenia. In 2003 he received the Istrian Arts Award "for special achievements in shaping, researching and preserving the cultural identity of Istria."

Apollonio worked in various mediums, including painting, graphics, sculpture, drawing, illustration, art equipment, mosaics and scenery. He has held over 40 solo exhibitions in galleries in Slovenia and around the world. He has also participated in many group exhibitions and international shows. He has won more than 30 national and international awards.
