= Gorenja Vas–Reteče =

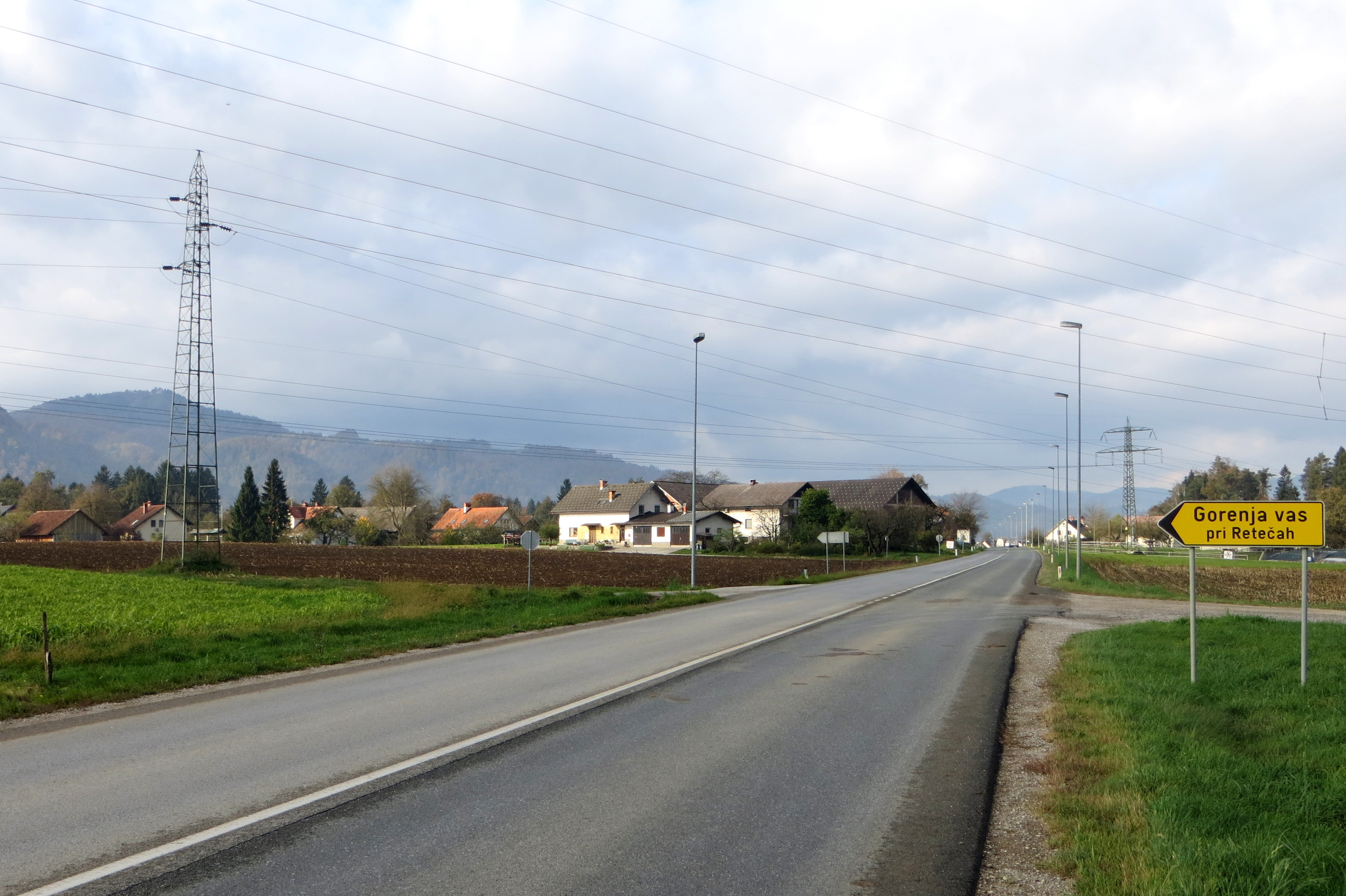

- Location in Slovenia
- Coordinates: 46°9′16.08″N 14°22′45.67″E
- Country: Slovenia
- Traditional region: Upper Carniola
- Statistical region: Upper Carniola
- Municipality: Škofja Loka

Area
  - Total: 2.81 km^{2} (1.08 sq mi)
- Elevation: 349.5 m (1,147 ft)

Population (2022)
  - Total: 411

Gorenja Vas–Reteče (pronounced [ɡɔˈɾeːnja ˈʋaːs ɾɛˈtɛːtʃɛ] or [ɡɔˈɾeːnja ˈʋaːs ɾɛˈteːtʃɛ]; Slovene: Gorenja vas - Reteče, German: Goreinawas) is a village on the left bank of the Sora River in the Municipality of Škofja Loka in the Upper Carniola region of Slovenia.

== Name ==
The name of the settlement was changed from Gorenja vas to Gorenja vas-Reteče in 1953. In the past the German name was Goreinawas.

== Demographics ==
In 2022, the population of Gorenja Vas–Reteče was 411.

	2002	2011	2021	2022	Percentage Increase
Population	368	368	398	411	+11.7%
