= Bertoki =

Bertoki Bertocchi (Italian)
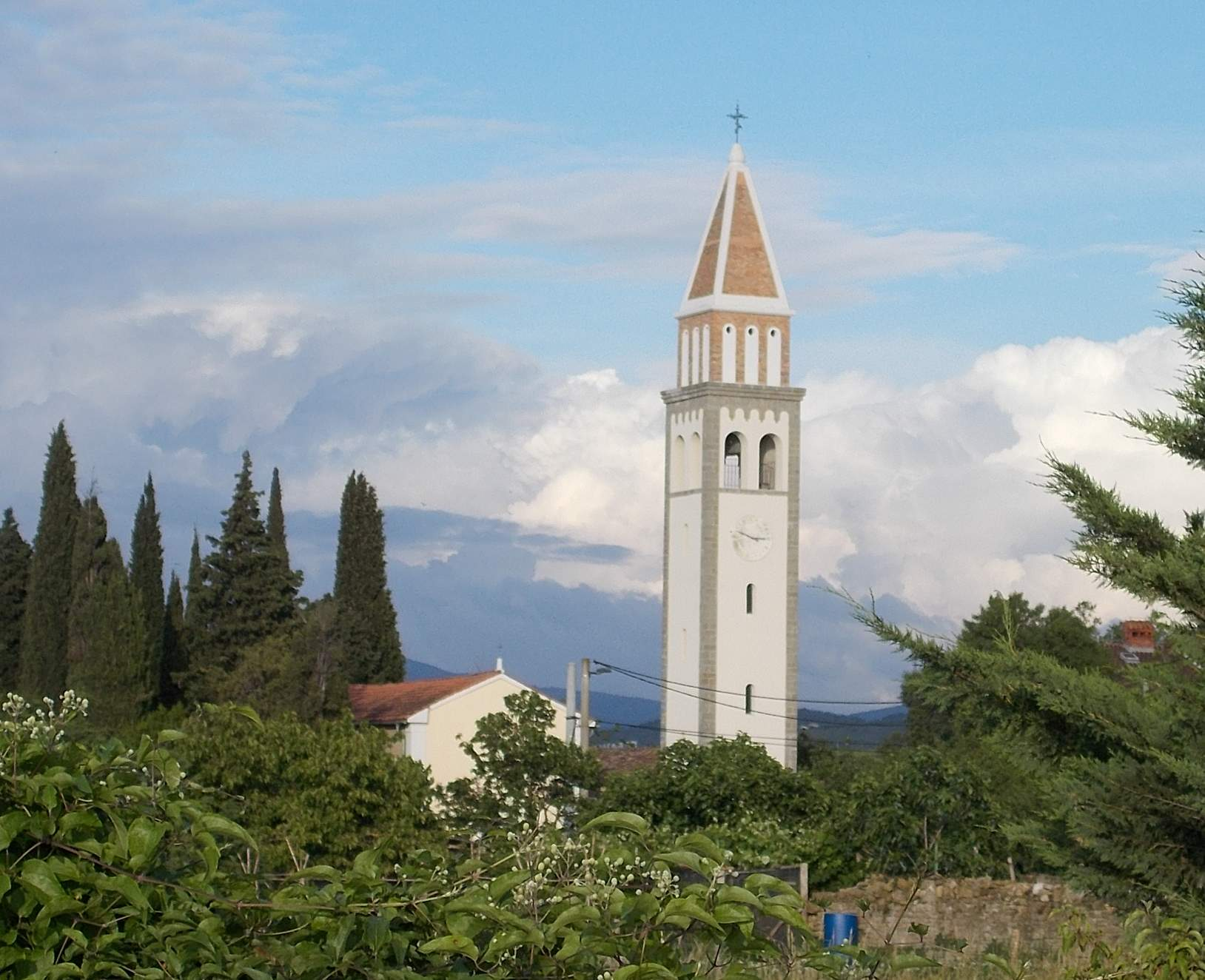

- Location in Slovenia
- Coordinates: 45°32′40.33″N 13°46′0.76″E
- Country: Slovenia
- Traditional region: Littoral
- Statistical region: Coastal–Karst
- Municipality: Koper

Area
  - Total: 4.996 km^{2} (1.929 sq mi)

Population (2026)
  - Total: 1,025
  - Density: 205/km^{2} (530/sq mi)

Bertoki (Slovene pronunciation: [bɛɾˈtóːki]; Italian: Bertocchi [berˈtɔkki]) is a settlement in the City Municipality of Koper in the Littoral region of southwestern Slovenia. In January 2026, the population was 1,025.

The parish church in the settlement is dedicated to the Assumption of the Virgin.
