= Bogdan Borčić =

Slovene painter

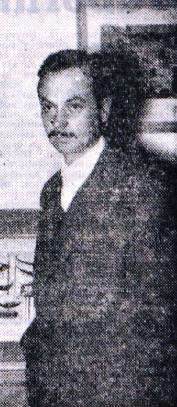
Bogdan Borčić

Bogdan Borčić (26 September 1926 – 24 April 2014) was a Slovene painter, printmaker, and educator. He was one of the most prolific and versatile Slovene visual artists.

== Life ==
Borčić was born in Ljubljana. He spent his childhood at his grandfather's home in Komiža, a coastal town on the island of Vis, Croatia. During World War II, he was deported to the Dachau concentration camp.

After the war, Borčić studied painting at the Academy of Fine Arts and Design in Ljubljana. He graduated in 1950, and continued his studies of painting with the Professor Gabrijel Stupica. He improved his work at the study travels to Amsterdam and Paris, where he worked in 1958 for three months in the studio of the printmaker Johnny Friedlaender.

Since 1969, he taught at the Academy of Fine Arts in Ljubljana, where since 1976 he held the post of the full professor of printmaking. At the invitation of the Academy of Fine Arts (Académie des Beaux-Arts) in Mons (Belgium), he lectured printmaking there for one month.

From 1980 until his death in 2014, he lived and created in Slovenj Gradec (Slovenia). In his later period, he created glowing images with extensive colour surfaces and added elements. He dedicated a series of images to the Dachau camp. The central motif of his last series of images was the smoking pipe.

== Legacy ==
Borčić's prints are kept in the collections of numerous worldwide-known museums, for example the Albertina in Vienna. The Božidar Jakac Gallery in Kostanjevica na Krki (Slovenia) maintains a special Bogdan Borčić Prints Cabinet with over 1,000 of his prints, including his renowned motifs of shells and series of various classical techniques. A larger collection of images is also kept at the Slovenj Gradec Fine Arts Gallery.

== Awards ==
In 1965, Borčić was bestowed the Prešeren Fund Award for his paintings exhibited in 1964. In 2005, he was awarded the Prešeren Award for his lifetime achievement.
