= Julia Doria =

Slovene writer

Julia Doria is a Slovene writer, illustrator and visual artist. Ljubljana, Slovenia. She writes children's books and prose fiction for adults. Her illustrations appear in children's picture books and in prose fiction and nonfiction books.

== Life and work ==
She graduated from the Faculty of Arts, Library and Information Science and Book Studies in Ljubljana in 2004 and from Academy of Fine Arts, Illustration & Visual Communication Design in Ljubljana in 2015. Since 2005 she has run her publishing house Atelje Doria.

== Published works ==
- Kresnička in njena lučka (The little Firefly and her Light), children's book, 2007 COBISS 235984640
- Naša kužica zaspanka (Our Puppy the Sleepyhead), children's book, 2007 COBISS 235985408
- Aidor – Legenda o Griču tisočerih rož (Aidor – The Legend of Thousand Fower Hill), prose, 2007 COBISS 235635456
- Netopirček Tinček (Tincek, the little Bat), children's book, 2008 COBISS 238244096
- Mavrica pripoveduje (The Rainbow is talking), children's book, 2010 COBISS 251688448
- Kresnička Sija in pikapolonica Lili na mavrični gugalnici (Sija the Firefly and Lili the Ladybug on Rainbow Swing ), children's book, 2011 COBISS 252817664
- Kako je muren Vladimir presenetil svet (How Vladimir the Cricket surprised the World), children's book, 2011 COBISS 255791872
- Diamanti na tvojem dvorišču (Diamonds in Your own Backyard), prose, 2011 COBISS 254225664
- Samoregulacija in učenje (Self-regulation and learning), 2011 COBISS 256569088
- Psička Pia in borovnice (Puppy Pia and the blueberries), children's book, 2012 COBISS 257153280
- Povodni mož Svit je zaljubljen (Svit the Water Man is in Love), children's book, 2012 COBISS 262863360
- Keltski vrt (Celtic garden), 2013 COBISS 268203264
- Vesoljček Pi (Alien Pi), children's book, 2015 COBISS 278403072
- Rdeči jelen in lešniki (The red Deer and the Hazelnuts), children's book, 2016 COBISS 283524864
- Feniks : grenko sladka mikropoezija, poetry, 2017 COBISS 288504320
- Abeceda z žužki, children's book, 2016 COBISS 284585728
- Marsovčki na počitnicah, children's book, 2017 COBISS 290301952, English translation When little Martians had holidays COBISS 290302208
- Metulj Modrin in čarobni vrt, children's book, 2017 COBISS 291758848, English translation The Chapman's Blue butterfly and the secret garden COBISS 291759360
- Cvetek, ki se ni hotel zmočiti, children's book, 2017 COBISS 291326720, English translation A floret that did not want to get wet COBISS 291327488
- Taščica, children's book, 2018 COBISS 292308992, English translation The redbreast COBISS 292309248
- Radovedni podlesek Albert, children's book, 2018 COBISS 293962752, English translation Curious Albert the hazel dormouse COBISS 293963264
- Glej, žaba!, children's book, 2018 COBISS 294986496, English translation Look, a frog! COBISS 294987264
- Čmrlj Brenčač, children's book, 2018 COBISS 296207872, English translation The buzzing bumblebee COBISS 296208128
- Dežela sneženega moža, children's book, 2019 COBISS 297395968, English translation The Land of the Snowman COBISS 297396224
- Zvonček in stržek prikličeta pomlad, children's book, 2019 COBISS 298380544, English translation The snowdrop and the wren summon the spring COBISS 298696192
- Vrt škrata Avgusta, children's book, 2019 COBISS 299661056, English translation The garden of August the dwarf COBISS 299661568
- Žužkopis : slikopis z žuželkami, children's book, 2019 COBISS 300621824
- Ptičje strašilo in lastovka, children's book, 2019 COBISS 301653248, English translation The scarecrow and the swallow COBISS 301653760
