= Matej Sternen =

Slovene painter

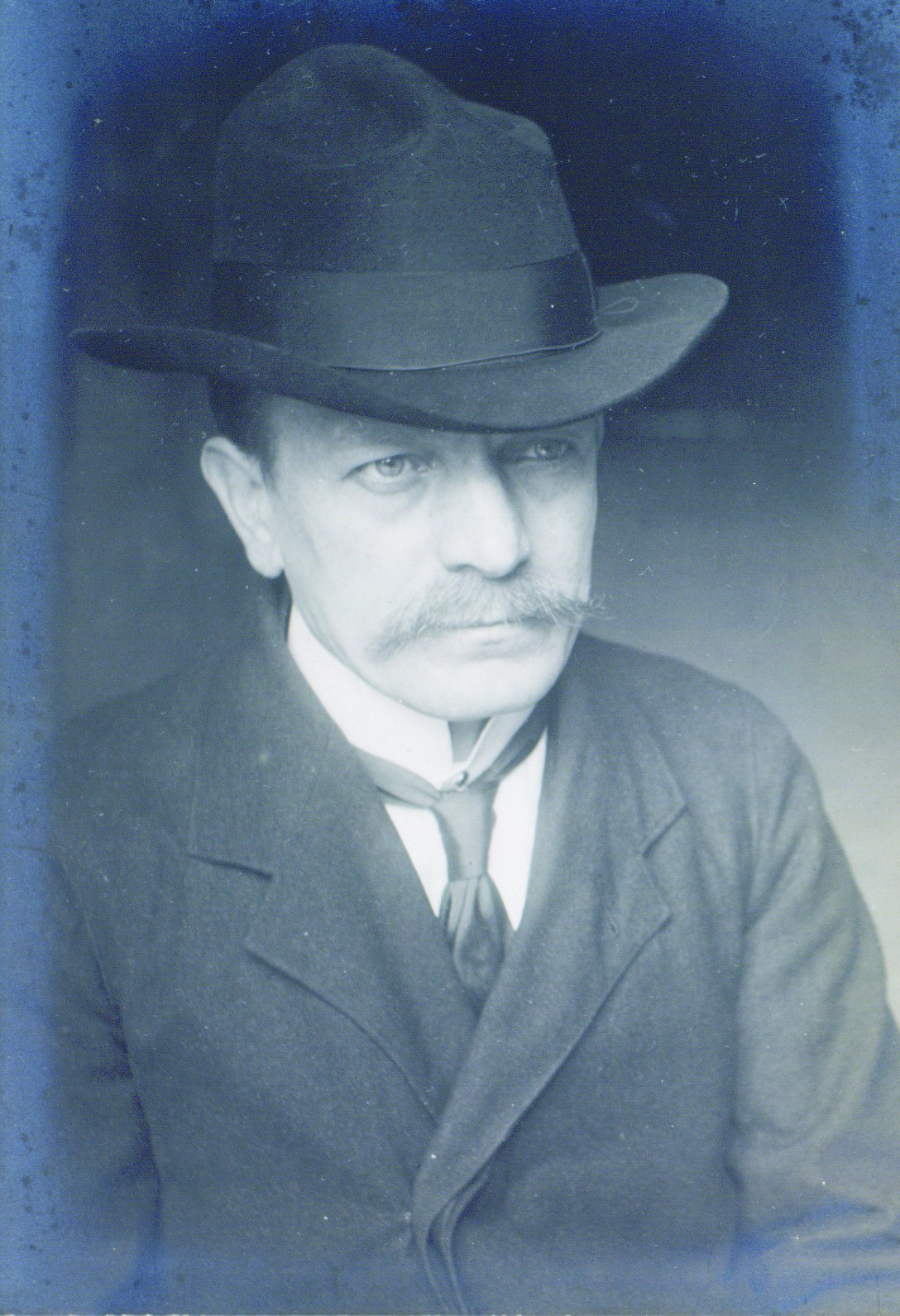
Matej Sternen in the 1920s

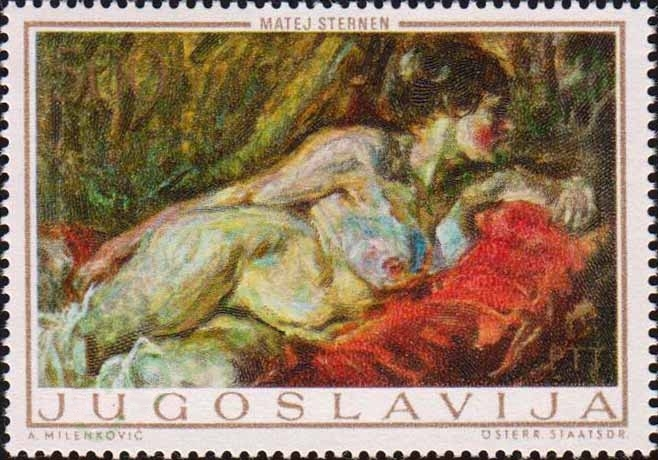
Woman on a Sofa (1914), a 1969 Yugoslav stamp

Matej Sternen (20 September 1870 – 28 June 1949) was a leading Slovene Impressionist painter.

Sternen was born in the Carniolan village of Verd—now part of the Municipality of Vrhnika, Slovenia, then part of the Austro-Hungarian Empire—and baptized Matthæus Strnen. He attended the secondary school in Krško and attended technical school in Graz between 1888 and 1891. After finishing the school in Graz, he enrolled at the Academy of Fine Arts in Vienna. In 1897 he left Vienna for Munich, where he studied at Anton Ažbe's private art school. He lived and worked in the Bavarian capital until Ažbe's death in 1905.

Sternen became acquainted with Impressionism already in Graz. In Vienna, he saw the original paintings of several French impressionists. In Munich he studied with fellow countrymen Rihard Jakopič and Matija Jama, two other representatives of Slovene impressionism. Unlike them, Sternen preferred figurative art, and his work consists mostly of portraits and female nudes.

He became known chiefly as a restorer and conservator of old paintings, and dedicated the majority of his later life to restoration. He partly restored and partly repainted the ceiling in the Franciscan church in Ljubljana, originally decorated by Matevž Langus in the mid 19th century, but badly damaged in the 1895 Ljubljana earthquake.

During World War II, Sternen did not take a political stance, although he was occasionally critical of the communist-led Liberation Front and its activities. In 1944 he painted a portrait of Home Guard General Leon Rupnik, who was the patron of his only solo exhibition in 1944. After the war, he was sent to a prison camp in the Kočevje area, but he was released after six months due to the intervention of prominent acquaintances. He taught painting to Aleksa Ivanc Olivieri. He died in Ljubljana on 28 June 1949 and was buried in Žale Cemetery.

== Works ==
- Rdeči parazol (The Red Parasol) (1904), National Gallery, Ljubljana
- Ulica v Münchnu (A Street in Munich), National Gallery, Ljubljana
- Pomladno sonce (Spring Sun), National Gallery, Ljubljana
- Na divanu (On the Couch) (1909), National Gallery, Ljubljana
- Frescos on ceiling of the Franciscan Church of the Annunciation (1935), In situ, Franciscan Church, Ljubljana
