= Miranda Rumina =

Slovenian multimedia artist and writer (born 1959)

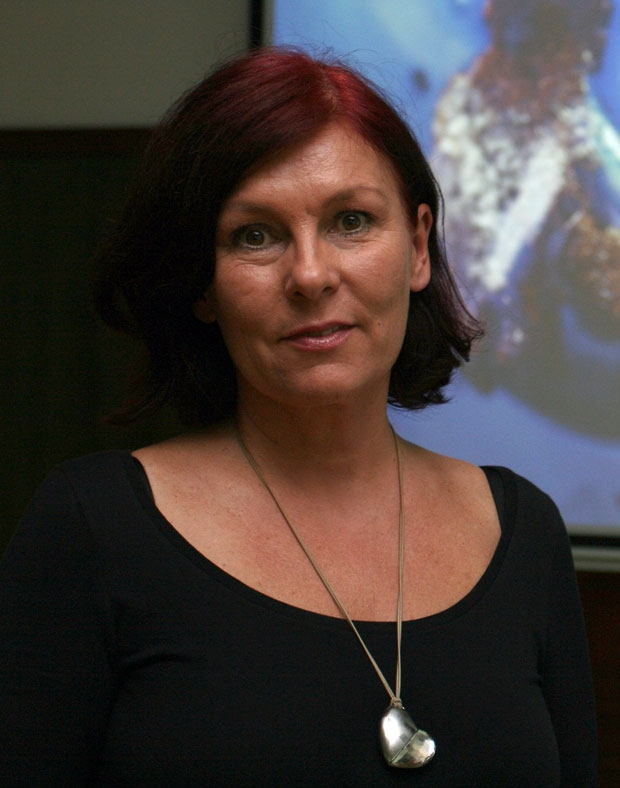
- Rumina in 2010
- Website: mirandarumina.com

Miranda Rumina [miránda rúmina] is a Slovenian Multimedia artist and writer.

== Life and work ==
Rumina is a painter, sculptor, writer and multimedia artist. She graduated from the Economics Faculty of the University of Ljubljana and continued with the study of the English and Italian language with literature on the Faculty of Arts. She lives between the town of Auroville and Slovenia with her husband, Dalai Eegol. She is the leader of numerous projects of Art Society Kerubin, which also has Kerubin Gallery in Izola.

Rumina uses a variety of techniques. Early in her career she developed a technique producing three-dimensional acrylic relief (Angels, Dance of the Planets), and she has worked with collage and digital graphics (Art & Fashion, 108 Simple Koans, Modern Angels). She also creates sculptures in glass (Odiseja 2001, Requiem, Planets) and in other materials (bronze, wax), and glass fusion paintings (Yin and Yang Spring Collection). In her multimedia projects, Ruminar combines artistic genres and techniques. Examples of such projects include Kerubin Launch (2002), She is ShAKTI (2004), Manhattan N.Y. (2005), Stoli/Chairs (2006) and Palčki/Gnomes (2006). Her work A Woman Saint and a Madam caused some controversy in her native country. In the year 2003 she was chosen to cooperate in Florence Biennale of Contemporary Art and she took part in the Summer Biennale in the town Lulea in Sweden.

Rumina is also a writer. In 2002, she published an autobiographical novel, Lydia. In 2003 she published her third book, Kodeks (Codex in English), a sequel and a build-up of her autobiography Lydia. The publication of Kodeks was accompanied by numerous multimedia presentations, an ice installation and a publication of the book in an interactive digital form. In the year 2007 she published a fairy tale The Little Mermaid and her Dolphin on DVD, in the form of an audio book with supplements. That same year she joined other artists in donated works for auction to support the Nangal Education Project in Thazhanguda, India.

In July 2009, Rumina won the RTV Slovenia MMC blogger contest. She is currently working with other artists and the Slovenian government to build a Slovenian Pavilion in the Internationalist Zone in Auroville.

Her work, 108 Simple Koans, is available as an iPhone application.

== Exhibitions and projects ==
=== 2002 ===
- Planets, Studio Gallery Gasspar, Piran

=== 2004 ===
- Ice installation Codex, Mercator center Ljubljana

=== 2007 ===
- Modern Angels, Tibetan Pavilion, Auroville, India

=== 2009 ===
- Paintings on marble and poetry reading, Auroville, India.

=== 2010 ===
- Installation Underwater
