= Avgust Černigoj =

- Born: August 24, 1898; Trieste, Austria-Hungary
- Died: November 17, 1985 (aged 87); Sežana, Slovenia
- Education: Academy of Fine Arts, Munich; Bauhaus (Weimar)
- Known for: Constructivism, collage, painting
- Movement: Constructivism, Avant-garde

Avgust Černigoj, also known in Italian as Augusto Cernigoi (August 24, 1898 – November 17, 1985), was a Yugoslav-era Slovenian painter known for his avant-garde experiments in Constructivism.

== Biography ==
He was born in Trieste, to a Slovenian family, in what was then part of the Austrian-Hungarian Empire. He finished Secondary School of Arts and Crafts in Trieste, continuing his studies at the Academy of Fine Arts in Munich. Later on, he attended the Bauhaus art school in Weimar, which had a profound impact on his development as an artist, having come into contact with Abstraction, the Russian avant-garde and particularly Constructivism through the works and teachings of Wassily Kandinsky, who brought it from Russia.

He returned to Yugoslavia, where he became friends with the avant-garde poet Srečko Kosovel. In 1924, he helped with the mounting of the first Constructivist exhibition in Yugoslavia, held in the premises of the Secondary Technical School in Ljubljana. The exhibits included architectural models, reliefs and sculptures, as well as parts of machines, overalls and politically artistic slogans. This exhibition has now been partially re-constructed as part of the new displays at the re-built Museum of Modern Art in Ljubljana.

In 1925, he became a political exile. Working briefly as a teaching assistant in Ljubljana, the Royal Yugoslav police discovered Communist literature in his personal mail. In a censorious political atmosphere, and due to the attention that his socially critical and provocative art attracted, he found it expedient to return to Trieste, rather than face possible arrest and imprisonment in Yugoslavia. There, he co-operated with an avant-garde stage manager Ferdo Delak in the forming of an international avant-garde magazine called Tank.

Černigoj's main contribution to the Slovene fine arts lies in the introduction of collage, which broadened the understanding of art and artistic work. He was also extremely productive in terms of book illustration, lithography, woodcuts and painting.

Černigoj focused mainly on painting and collage in his later years. He had a lifelong fondness of the Slovenian Karst region, and spent his last six years there. He died in Sežana, Slovenia. Today, the bulk of his life's work can be seen in the August Černigoj Galerija in Lipica, Slovenia, in addition to the Moderna Galerija in Ljubljana.

In 1998, two Slovenian postage stamps were issued in his honour.

== References and sources ==
Sources

- August Černigoj discussion at "Trans Balkan Express" blog
