= Štefan Planinc =

Slovene surrealist painter (born 1925)

- Born: September 8, 1925; Ljubljana, Slovenia
- Died: 2.9.2017; Ljubljana, Slovenia
- Education: Academy of Fine Arts, Ljubljana
- Known for: painting, illustrating
- Notable work: Painting and illustration
- Awards: Levstik Award; 1959 Tajno društvo PGC and Živali v ukrivljenem zrcalu Levstik Award; 1963 Pesmi za otroke Prešeren Foundation Award; 1965 his paintings Jakopič Award; 1984 achievements in painting

Štefan Planinc (8 September 1925 – 2017) was a Slovene surrealist painter also known for his illustrations for newspapers, magazines and books.

Planinc was born in Ljubljana in 1925. He studied at the Ljubljana Academy of Fine Arts and has received numerous awards for his works. He won the Levstik Award in 1959 and 1965.

== Selected Illustrated Works ==
- Mame ni doma (Mum is not at Home), written by Erich Kästner, 1992
- Lessie se vrača (Lassie Come-Home), written by Eric Knight, 1985
- Pesmi za lačne sanjavce (Poems for Hungry Dreamers), written by Milan Dekleva, 1981
- Vrtiljak (The Merry-Go-Round), written by Tone Pavček, 1980
- Cigančica (The Little Gipsy Girl ), written by Tone Seliškar, 1979
- Hišica brez napisa (The Little House Without a Sign), written by Jože Snoj, 1978
- Kvadrat pa pika (A Square and a Dot), written by Gregor Strniša, 1977
- Andrejčkova glava je prazna (Little Andrej's Head is Empty), written by Žarko Petan, 1967
- Drejček in trije marsovčki (Drejček and the Three Martians), written by Vid Pečjak, 1965
- Tajno društvo PGC (The PGC Secret Society ), written by Anton Ingolič, 1959
- Živali v ukrivljenem zrcalu (Animals in a Curved Mirror), written by Vid Pečjak, 1957
- Črni bratje (Black Brothers), written by France Bevk, 1957
- Otroška leta (Childhood Years), written by France Bevk, 1956
