= Lojze Logar =

Lojze Logar (30 July 1944 in Mežica – 12 October 2014 in Izola) was a Slovenian painter, graphic artist and professor, a 1987 Prešeren Fund Award and 1994 Jakopič Award laureate.
