= Marij Pregelj =

Slovenian painter and illustrator (1913–1967)

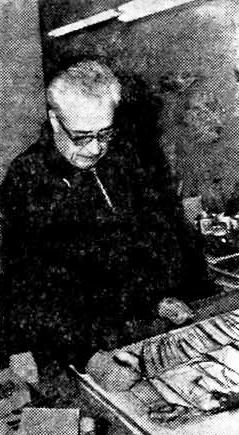
- Born: 8 August 1913; Kranj, Slovenia
- Died: 18 March 1967; Ljubljana, Slovenia
- Education: Academy of Fine Arts, Zagreb
- Known for: Painting and illustrating
- Notable work: Painting and illustration
- Awards: Levstik Award; 1949 for Otroška leta Levstik Award; 1957 for Beli očnjak Prešeren Award; 1958 for a mosaic in Trbovlje; Levstik Award; 1959 for Starec in morje Prešeren Award; 1964 for his exhibition at the Museum of Modern Art, Ljubljana; Jakopič Award; 1969 for his achievements in painting

Marij Pregelj (8 August 1913 – 18 March 1967) was a Slovene painter, considered one of the key figures in Slovene painting in the second half of the 20th century.

Pregelj was born in Kranj in 1913 and was the son of the Slovene writer and playwright Ivan Pregelj. He studied art at the Zagreb Academy of Fine Arts from 1932 to 1936. He was known for his oil paintings, mostly landscapes, still lifes, and portraits, and also for his illustrations, most notably those for the 1950 and 1951 editions of Anton Sovre's translation of Homer's Iliad and Odyssey. He won the Levstik Award for his illustrations three times: in 1949 for his illustrations for France Bevk's collection of stories Otroška leta (My Childhood Years), in 1957 for Jack London's White Fang (Slovene title: Beli očnjak), and in 1959 for Hemingway's The Old Man and the Sea (Slovene title: Starec in morje). He taught painting to Aleksa Ivanc Olivieri.

He won the Prešeren Award twice, in 1958 for his mosaic at the Worker's Union building in Trbovlje and in 1964 for an exhibition of his paintings in the Museum of Modern Art in Ljubljana the previous year. In 1969 he was also the first recipient of the Jakopič Award for painting.

From December 2017 to May 2018, a retrospective exhibition of Pregelj's oeuvre was held at the Museum of Modern Art in Ljubljana.
