= Božidar Jakac =

Slovene artist

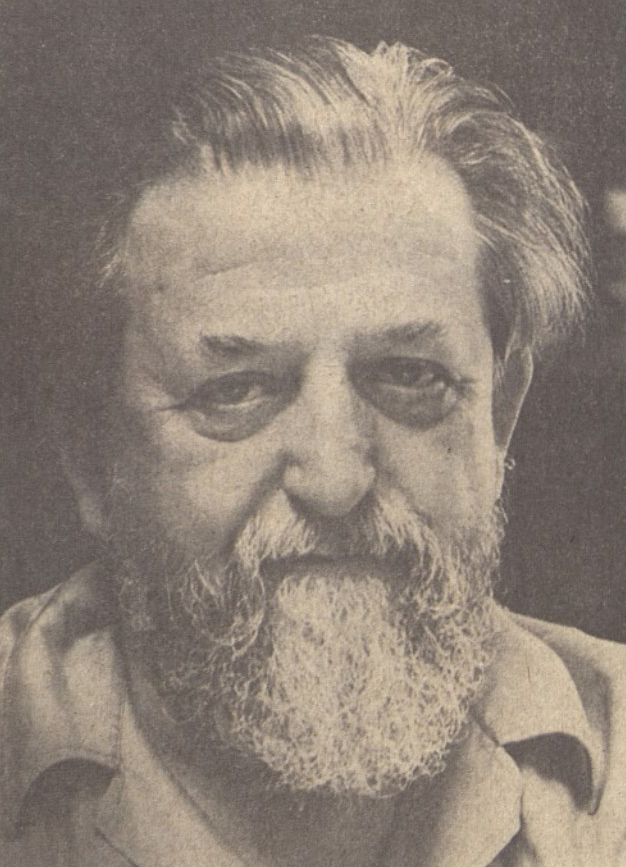
- Born: July 16, 1899; Novo Mesto, Duchy of Carniola, Austria-Hungary
- Died: November 20, 1989 (aged 90); Ljubljana, Slovenia, Yugoslavia
- Education: Academy of Fine Arts in Prague
- Known for: painting, printmaking, illustration, documentary film
- Notable work: Concert, Portrait of France Prešeren, Following the Traces of the 4th and 5th Offensive (drawings collection), Portrait of Oton Župančič, The Teran Vine
- Movement: Expressionism, Lyrical Realism, Symbolism
- Awards: AVNOJ Award; 1967; Prešeren Award; 1947; Prešeren Award; 1948; Prešeren Award; 1980

Božidar Jakac (July 16, 1899 – November 20, 1989) was a Slovene Yugoslavian expressionist, realist and symbolist painter, printmaker, art teacher, photographer and filmmaker. He produced one of the most extensive oeuvres of pastels and oil paintings (landscapes, vedutas and portraits), drawings and, especially, prints in Slovenia. He was also one of the key organizers in the establishment of the Ljubljana Academy of Fine Arts and the International Biennal of Graphic Art in Ljubljana. Some of his work is on display in museums in Belgrade.

== Biography ==
Jakac was born in Novo Mesto, which was then part of Austria-Hungary. He started painting in 1910 or 1911, when he was attending the Novo Mesto grammar school, and more seriously, when he was attending the technical high school in Idrija, which he finished in 1917. As he lacked money to continue the studies, he had to set off to the Isonzo Front to fight for the monarchy. In 1918, after World War I ended, Ivan Vavpotič, his former professor, introduced him to the prominent Slovene Impressionist painter Rihard Jakopič, who exhibited Jakac's paintings and became his first true tutor.

From November 1919, Jakac studied painting and printmaking at the Academy of Fine Arts in Prague (under professors Jakub Obrovský and Franz Thiele). There, he came into contact with rich artistic tradition and versatile modern art movements that expanded his artistic horizons tremendously. During that period he also visited Paris and Bremen. He finished the postgraduate studies of printmaking under professor August Brömse.

In 1920, Jakac returned to Novo Mesto and became the bearer of The Spring of Novo Mesto, an avant-garde movement in literature and fine arts, which included also the poets Miran Jarc and Anton Podbevšek, the painter Ivan Čargo and the composer Marij Kogoj. In 1924, he settled in Ljubljana. At first, he earned his money as a woodcut illustrator at the liberal newspaper Jutro and a professor of drawing at the Second State Gymnasium in Ljubljana. Three years later he gave up his work and became an independent artist. At that time he also travelled extensively, for example to Paris, Tunisia, the Americas and Norway, and married Tatjana Gudrunova, who profoundly influenced his work. In 1932, he published his memoirs and letters from America in the book Odmevi rdeče zemlje ("The Echoes of the Red Earth"), in cooperation with his friend Jarc.He taught painting to Aleksa Ivanc Olivieri.

In September 1943, Jakac joined the partisan resistance in the Province of Ljubljana, where he promoted culture and education and noted the events in numerous graphics. In October 1943, he participated as a deputy at the Assembly of the Delegates of the Slovene Nation in Kočevje, which was a general constitutional convention organised by the Liberation Front of the Slovene Nation to establish the legal basis for the future political sovereignty of the Slovenes. In that year, he was also among the Slovene deputies at the second AVNOJ Conference in Jajce. At that time he contributed significantly to the establishment of Ljubljana Academy of Fine Arts, which was realised in 1945, and then served as its dean for three terms (1945–1947, 1947–1949, and later in 1959–1961) and taught printmaking till his retirement in 1961.

In 1949, Jakac became a full member of the Slovenian Academy of Sciences and Arts. In addition, in 1963 he became a correspondent member of the Yugoslav Academy of Sciences and Arts in Zagreb and a correspondent member of the Serbian Academy of Sciences and Arts in Belgrade. He was the president of the Association of Fine Artists of Yugoslavia, a republican and federal deputy, and in 1955, the initiator of the international Biennial of Graphic Arts in Ljubljana.

Jakac died in Ljubljana in 1989 and is buried in Novo Mesto.

== Work ==
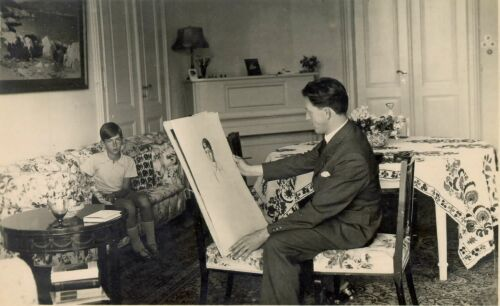
Jakac painting Peter II of Yugoslavia, Bled, 1934

Jakac's first steps in the arts were literary and musical in nature, since he was not sure yet which branch of the arts he preferred. However, as he discovered the fine art he was hooked on it once and for all. In his teenager years, he created watercolors of scenes from nature and of the Novo Mesto landscape, distinguished by reduced Realism, Mood Impressionism and the exploration of light effects, as well as by discovery and establishment of his pastel technique.

After the departure to Prague he progressed rapidly in his artistic development and incorporated many of the elements of Cubism, Expressionism and Abstract art in his works. Although he liked to picture the landscape of the Czech lands, he preferred the poetic landscape of his home region Lower Carniola (Dolenjska), full of shades and veiled atmosphere. On his travels abroad in the 1930s, Jakac photographed and painted what he saw, giving his work an important documentary value. His art slowly transformed itself into lyrical realism.

After the war Jakac continued to paint landscapes of the dynamic Lower Carniola. Some of Jakac's best works (The Teran Vine, The Last Stars) originate from his late period, when he created symbolistically charged colored woodcuts. Jakac was essentially a black-and-white artist. His favourite painting technique was chalk pastel, which appealed to him due to its mellowness and the possibility for quick painting during his numerous travels.

Jakac was an excellent portraitist who depicted a number of prominent Slovenes and Yugoslavs, friends and very often also himself. In 1940 he painted a portrait of the Slovenian poet France Prešeren, which became one of the emblematic rafigurations of the national poet. Between 1949 and 1974, his portraits and other drawings were used in a series of Yugoslav postage stamps. Jakac was also one of the pioneers of the Slovene cinema. He produced several black-and-white documentary vedutas of Novo Mesto, which made him the first Slovene master of camera.

Today, many of the works of Jakac are permanently exhibited in Božidar Jakac Gallery in Kostanjevica na Krki and in Jakac House in Novo Mesto. His films are kept by the Archives of the Republic of Slovenia.

== Awards and commemorations ==
Jakac received numerous local and foreign awards for his work. The most prestigious of them was the AVNOJ Award, which he won in 1967. He was also awarded the Prešeren Award four times: for his drawings collection Po sledovih 4. in 5. ofenzive ("Following the Traces of the 4th and 5th Offensive") in 1947, for his sepia drawing Portret Otona Župančiča ("A Portrait of Oton Župančič") in 1948, for his illustrative cycle XIV. divizija na Štajerskem ("The 14th Division in Lower Styria") in 1949, and for his rich exhibition activity in the past years and a vivid fine art presence in the Slovene and Yugoslav cultural space in 1980.

Jakac was named the honorary academician of Accademia dell'Arte del Disegno in Florence (1965) and a full member of European Academy of Arts, Sciences and Humanities in Paris (1982). In 1959, he was the first person bestowed the title of the honorary freeman of Novo Mesto. Since June 2012, a bronze bust of Božidar Jakac, work of the academic sculptor Drago Tršar, stands in front of the University of Ljubljana.
