= Barbara Jožefa Struss =

Slovenian drawing teacher and painter (1805–1880)

- Born: Barbara Struss; 29 November 1805; Ljubljana
- Died: 3 January 1880 (aged 74); Ljubljana
- Occupations: drawing teacher, painter
- Organization: Ursulines

Barbara Struss, Sister Marija Jožefa, (29 November 1805 – 3 January 1880), Slovenian drawing teacher and painter. She is considered one of Slovenian "Old Masters".

== Early life ==
Barbara Jožefa was born on 29 November 1805 in Ljubljana in a family of servants Marija Tratnik and Anton Struss. In 1823 she entered the Ursuline convent in Ljubljana. She pronounced her perpetual vows in 1829. Shortly after her arrival at the convent, at the suggestion of the community’s spiritual director Janez Šlaker, the painter Matevž Langus began teaching drawing to the novices, including Barbara Jožefa. Barbara Jožefa assisted him in painting the altarpiece of the Holy Trinity for the main altar of the Ursuline church in Ljubljana.

== Teaching career and later years ==
In 1826 she was appointed drawing teacher at both the inner and outer Ursuline schools, a position she held well into old age. For several decades she also served as prefect of the convent’s educational establishment. In 1874 she was elected prioress of the Ljubljana Ursuline convent, a role she fulfilled until her death.

== Artistic work ==
She painted throughout her life. Many of her works were created for the needs of the convent and the Ursuline church, as well as for other churches. She worked extensively in oil and also executed frescoes. She signed her works with her initials.

=== Major works ===
- Altarpiece of the Holy Trinity (1840): Prepared the compositional sketches and underdrawing for the Holy Trinity painting in the Ursuline church.
- Saint John the Evangelist (oil on canvas): One of the side‑altar oil paintings for the church.
- Stations: Painted wooden or canvas panels for the “Holy Sepulchre” backdrop.
- The Sacred Hearts of Jesus and Mary (oil on canvas): For the convent chapel.
- Frescoes in the refectory: A cycle of saints and Jesus (Joseph, Anne, Ursula, Angela, Augustine, Ignatius, Teresa, Catherine, Jesus, and Mary) on the walls of the convent dining hall.
- View of Bled (oil on canvas).
- Frescoes by the convent garden: Thirty smaller scenes.
- Portrait of Bishop Anton Aloys Wolf (1845): Formal oil portrait for Alojzijevišče.
- Christ in Dobrova (1848, painted on tin): For the cemetery there.
- Our Lady at the Cross (parish church of Litija): Altarpiece.
- Portrait of J. J. Schellenberg (1847).

== Death and legacy ==
Barbara Jožefa died on 3 January 1880 in Ljubljana. Her works still adorn the Ljubljana Ursuline convent. Art‑historical analysis places her among the “Old Masters” of Slovenian visual art, recognizing her as a key figure in the 19th‑century artistic network.
