= Aleksa Ivanc Olivieri =

Slovenian painter, printmaker and art restorer who worked in France (1916–2010)

- Born: Aleksa Ivanc; August 11, 1916; Ljubljana, Carniola, Austria-Hungary (now Slovenia)
- Died: June 11, 2010 (aged 93); Corsica, France
- Occupations: painter, graphic designer, art restorer

Aleksa Ivanc Olivieri (11 August 1916 – 11 June 2010) was a Slovenian painter, graphic designer and art restorer. From 1965 she lived and worked in France.

== Early life ==
She was born into a Slovenian family on 11 August 1916 in Spodnja Šiška, Ljubljana. Her mother, Marija Kolar, worked as a maidservant and her father, Jakob Ivanc, was a railway employee. She attended primary school (meščanska šola) in Ljubljana. Afterward, she began studying at textile design school in Kranj.

== Work in Slovenia ==
After finishing textile design school, she moved to Celje and worked as a textile pattern drawer. At the beginning of World War II, she returned to Ljubljana, where she took a drawing course with France Gorše. She also studied with Matej Sternen and Božidar Jakac. After the war she studied painting in Belgrade with Ivan Tabaković, and later in Ljubljana with Slavko Pengov, Gabrijel Stupica and Marij Pregelj. She also engaged in mountaineering and, in 1947, attended a federal course for climbing instructors. She graduated in 1950 and then specialized in art conservation and restoration. From this period several of her reproductions survive, including a copy of the Holy Family by Franc Jelovšek, kept at the Basilica of Mary Help of Christians, Brezje.

Art historian Emilijan Cevc suggested that she design a Nativity set (jaslice) inspired by Gothic frescoes. Her first Nativity sheets were made in 1944 but were lost during the war. In 1946, commissioned by the newspaper Oznanilo, she painted a second set, now in the Nativity Museum in Brezje. On eighteen sheets (48 × 33 cm) she depicted all the figures in the Nativity. The surrounding space is ornamented with vignettes and motifs. On one larger sheet (36 × 63 cm) she presented a layout for the Nativity scene. She worked in a mixed technique of tempera, gouache, watercolor and colored pencils. The set reflects two centuries of Gothic fresco development. By simplifying forms, especially drapery and color, she created a coherent composition. Where shepherds and donors were hard to source, she adapted figures not originally tied to the Nativity cycle. The principal motifs derive from late Gothic works.

Her first exhibition took place in 1951. She was particularly drawn to medieval frescoes. Her copy of the Three Kings from Mače appeared in a traveling exhibition of Yugoslav frescoes shown in major European capitals.

== Work abroad ==
After visiting the Venice Biennale in 1952 she remained abroad, which effectively closed the door on returning home at that time. She worked in Sardinia, Paris, Provence, Spain, Algeria, Morocco and Mauritania. Later she spent two years in Rome refining her painting and printmaking, illustrated several books, and participated in the first exhibition of Slovenian émigré graphics in Buenos Aires. During the following decade she worked and exhibited in France and Algeria. With works from this period she participated in a group exhibition of contemporary Slovenian art in New York (1964) and the following year in Washington, D.C. In 1965 she settled on Corsica, in L'Île-Rousse near Calvi, and on 16 September 1965 she married the Frenchman Pierre Olivieri. She later exhibited in Paris and in other cities across France and Switzerland. She held several notable exhibitions in Italy, France and the United States.

== Later life ==
Her first exhibition in Slovenia after leaving in the 1950s was organized in 1996 at the St. Stanislav's Institute by the émigré association Slovenija v svetu (Slovenia in the World). In 1999 she painted the fourteen Stations of the Cross for the parish church of St. Martin in Doberdob, which were displayed in 2002. She died on 11 June 2010 in Corsica. She is buried in the village of Occiglione (Santa-Reparata-di-Balagna) on Corsica.

== Reception in Slovenia ==
Art historian Ivan Sedej called her “a poet of Mediterranean austerity and bitter monumentality,” writing: “Sooner or later this painter will gain her deserved place on our artistic Olympus... Her painting is so strong, and she such an interesting personality, that we will have to reckon with her oeuvre in any honest survey of Slovenian visual art.” Her work was also highly valued in a dedicated study by art historian Marijan Tršar.

== Style ==
At first close to Impressionism and later to postmodernism, her palette in her Spanish and African periods acquired a distinctive luminous quality by which she is recognized. Her late work is best represented by the Stations of the Cross painted in 1999 for the Church of St. Martin in Doberdob. Her color range is closely aligned with the hues of the landscapes of Corsica and the Karst.

== Film ==
A documentary film about her, Aleksa Ivanc Olivieri – iskalka luči (Seeker of Light), was released in 2014. The screenplay and direction were by Tamara Trček Pečak, Vesna Krmelj and Rahela Jagrič; the film was produced by KUD Sestava, narrated by Jure Franko, with music directed by Gašper Trček. The film includes archival footage shot in 1994 at the artist's home on Corsica by cinematographer Jože Jagrič.

== Publications with her illustrations ==
- Dove le nubi fuggono, Rafko Vodeb (Rome, 1953)
- Kam potujejo oblaki?, Rafko Vodeb (Rome, 1953)
- Na steni spi čas, Branko Rozman (Rome, 1954)
- Pot iz doline, Vinko Beličič (Trieste, 1954)
- Ecce homo – Križev pot, Via crucis, Dane Zajc (2004)
