= Gojmir Anton Kos =

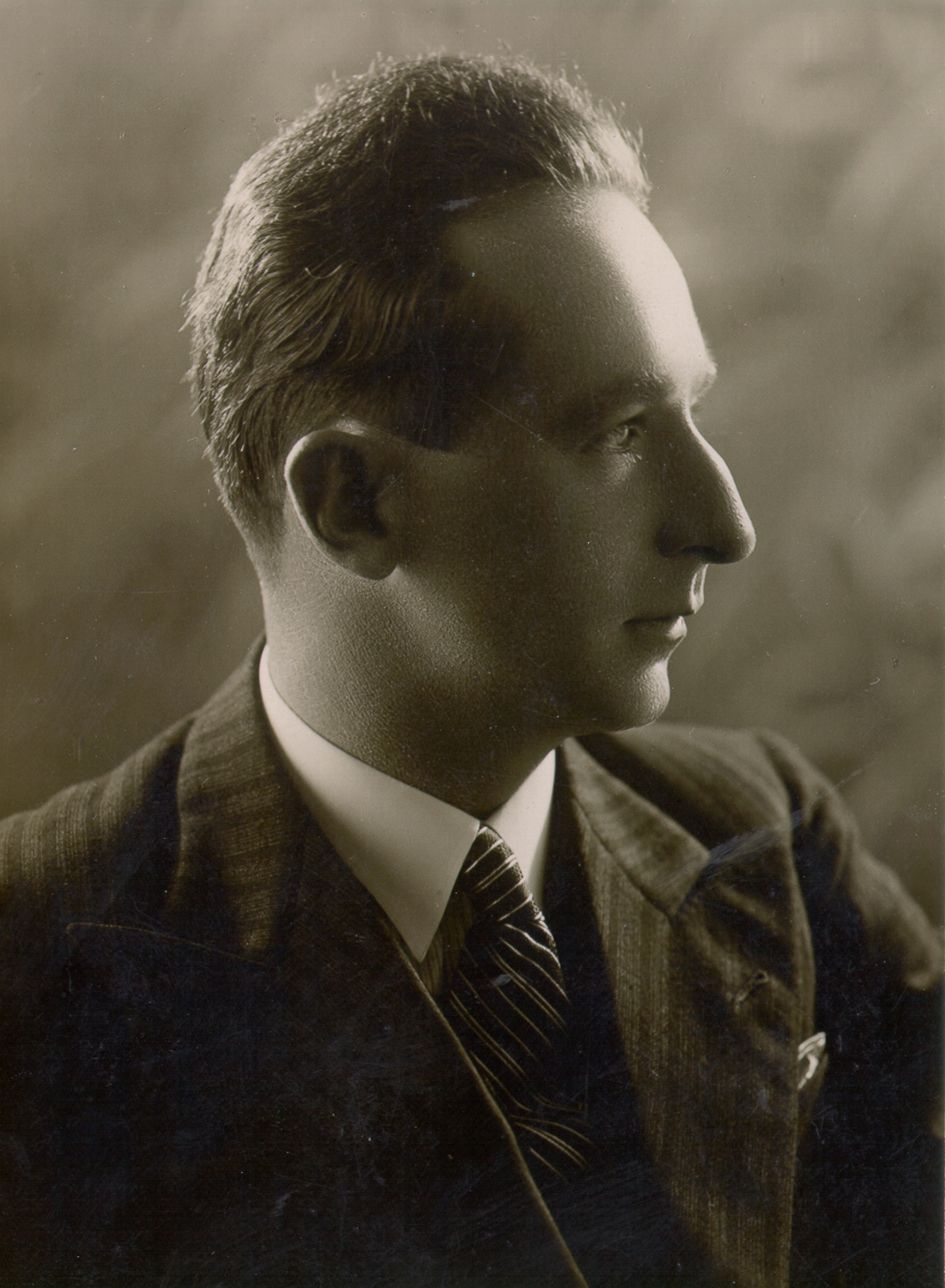
- Born: January 24, 1896; Gorizia, Austria-Hungary
- Died: May 22, 1970 (aged 74); Ljubljana, Slovenia, Yugoslavia
- Education: Academy of Fine Arts Vienna, College of Arts and Crafts in Zagreb
- Known for: Painting, photography
- Notable work: Girl with an Accordion, Self-Portrait, monumental compositions from Slovene history: The Enthronement in the Zollfeld, The Defeat of Rebellious Peasants near Krško
- Movement: Art Nouveau, Expressionism, Color realism, Poetic realism
- Awards: Prešeren Award; 1947 Girl with an Accordion; Prešeren Award; 1950 Self-Portrat

Gojmir Anton Kos (January 24, 1896 – May 22, 1970) was a Slovene academy-trained painter, photographer, and professor at the Academy of Fine Arts in Ljubljana.

Gojmir was born in the town of Gorizia (then part of Austria-Hungary, now in Italy), where his father, the renowned historian Franc Kos from the vicinity of Škofja Loka in Carniola, taught at the State Gymnasium. His mother was a Friulian from the Austrian Littoral. Gojmir's older brother Milko later also became a prominent historian and chancellor of the University of Ljubljana.

Gojmir studied at the Academy of Fine Arts in Vienna under Rudolf Bacher and Julius Schmidt. Due to the collapse of Austria-Hungary, he finished his last semester at the College of Arts and Crafts in Zagreb, where he graduated in 1919. At that time he also passed an examination qualifying him as a professor of drawing. In 1924 he moved to Ljubljana, where he initially taught at secondary schools. After World War II he was appointed a full professor of drawing at the newly established Academy of Fine Arts in Ljubljana, where he remained until his retirement in 1962. From 1948 to the spring of 1949 he also directed the Museum of Modern Art in Ljubljana.

== Work ==
Kos' paintings were mainly landscapes, portraits, monumental scenes from Slovene history (exhibited in the Slovenian Presidential Palace), figurative compositions, and still lifes, at which he especially excelled. His favorite medium was oil on canvas, although in his early years he also created some book illustrations, posters, and furniture. In his works he emphasized light contrasts and color over the reality of images.

Kos was also an avid photographer and the organiser of the first photography exhibition in Ljubljana.

Kos won numerous prizes for his work, including the Prešeren Award for his oil painting Dekle s harmoniko (Girl with an Accordion) in 1947 and again for his oil painting Avtoportret (Self-Portrait) in 1950. In that year he also exhibited at the Venice Biennale. On December 6, 1949 he became a member of the Slovene Academy of Sciences and Arts.
