= Adriana Maraž =

Slovenian artist (1931–2015)

Adriana Jadranka Maraž
- Born: 26 December 1931; Ilirska Bistrica, Slovenia
- Died: 8 May 2015 (aged 83)
- Education: Academy of Fine Arts, Ljubljana
- Known for: Painting

Adriana Jadranka Maraž (26 December 1931 – 8 May 2015) was a Slovene graphic artist. She was born in Ilirska Bistrica. From 1949 until 1957, she studied painting and graphic art with the professor Maksim Sedej at the Academy of Fine Arts (Akademija za likovno umetnost) (ALU) in Ljubljana. She had many solo exhibitions and has participated in the Graphic Art Biennales in Ljubljana. She won the Grand Prix at the second Norwegian International Print Biennale in Fredrikstad.

Maraž won the Jakopič award, the award for achievements in children's literature, in 1977 and the Prešeren Fund Award, the award for the artistic achievements, in 1983.
