= Mihaela Adelgundis Černic =

Slovenian painter (1913–2016)

- Born: Mihaela Černic; 29 September 1913; Miren, Austria-Hungary (now Slovenia)
- Died: 28 August 2016 (aged 102); Gorizia, Italy
- Occupations: painter; art teacher

Mihaela Černic, sister Marija Adelgundis (29 September 1913 – 28 August 2016), was a Slovenian painter and teacher of painting and art. She was an important figure among Slovenian minority in Italy and was important in preserving Slovenian culture in Gorizia région.

== Life and work ==
Mihaela Adelgundis was born on 29 September 1913, in Miren as the fifth child in Slovenian family. Her mother was Jožefa Batistič, a field labourer, and her father was Avguštin Černic, a shoemaker. After finishing primary school in her hometown, she entered the convent of the School Sisters of Notre Dame (Istituto Nostra Signora) in Gorizia on 16 September 1928. There, she first attended city school for three years and then studied for another three years at a school preparing for religious life, partly in Gorizia and partly in Ilirska Bistrica. She began her novitiate on 27 August 1934. She took her first vows on 28 August 1935, and her final vows on 15 August 1941. Early in her youth, she showed a talent for art. After taking her first vows, she enrolled at the Academy of Fine Arts in Venice, where she graduated in 1943. She later continued her artistic studies in Rome as well. In 1955, she passed the professor’s examination and began several decades of teaching art and painting at high schools in Gorizia. She also taught privately. She remained artistically active throughout her life and retirement; even in old age, she continued to paint and draw intensively. She died on 28 August 2016, at the Sisters of Notre Dame convent in Gorizia, at the age of 102. She left behind a substantial body of artistic work.

== Artistic style ==
From early childhood, Mihaela Adelgundis showed a strong passion for drawing, and over the course of her long career she developed a distinctive classical-figurative style. She remained faithful to traditional artistic representation and did not follow the trends of modernist abstraction. Her works are mostly realistic and marked by a deep appreciation for the beauty of nature. She especially enjoyed depicting natural motifs, flowers, still lifes, birds, and religious themes—particularly images of the Virgin Mary, angels, and saints. As a versatile artist, she worked in various techniques: oil on canvas, tempera, and watercolor, and also produced numerous drawings, sketches, architectural designs, and illustrations. She even experimented with relief work. Her rich artistic creations adorn many churches, institutions, and private homes throughout the Goriška and Trieste regions, as well as in Rome and beyond. Among her most notable contributions are religious motifs still displayed in Italian churches in Gorizia, Trieste, and Rome. Many of her paintings are preserved in the Notre Dame convent in Gorizia, where they decorate the convent. She is also known for her depiction of the Merciful Jesus in a chapel near her home in Miren. On occasion, she contributed artwork to publications—for example, the cover of the vinyl record Svetokriška mladina poje (1978) features her painting of the parish church in Sv. Križ near Trieste.
