= Jože Ciuha =

Slovenian painter (1924–2015)

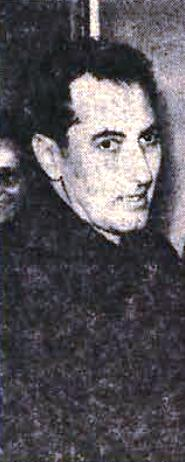
Jože Ciuha in the 1960s

Jože Ciuha (26 April 1924 – 12 April 2015) was a Slovenian painter.

== Biography ==
Jože Ciuha was born in Trbovlje. He graduated from the Academy of Fine Arts in Ljubljana in 1950. During his career, he traveled extensively. His artistic style was influenced by the time he spent in Macedonia as a student, as well as his stints in Paris and the Far East in the 1950s, and North and South America during the 1960s. Ciuha taught at the International Summer Academy in Salzburg in the 1970s, at Western Michigan University in Kalamazoo, at the International Graphic School in Venice, as well as the Academy of Fine Arts in Ljubljana.

Ciuha produced artwork in various styles, including watercolors, drawings, illustrations, mosaics, and tapestries. He also wrote poetry and prose. Some of his works are still exhibited at several major international art institutions.
