= Academy of Fine Arts and Design =

Art school of the University of Ljubljana

Coordinates: 48.141864°N 17.10736°E

The Academy of Fine Arts and Design (Slovene: Akademija za likovno umetnost in oblikovanje, also known by the acronym ALUO), is an art academy and institution based in Ljubljana, Slovenia. It is part of the University of Ljubljana.

From 1945 to 1961, Božidar Jakac taught graphic arts at the academy, and also served as a dean three times. The current dean of the academy is prof. Alen Ožbolt.

== Notable faculty ==
- Jože Ciuha (1924–2015)
- Božidar Jakac (1899–1989)
- Boris Kalin (1905–1975)
- Gojmir Anton Kos (1896–1970)
- Adriana Maraž (1931-2015)
- Miki Muster (1925-2018)
- Igor Torkar (1913–2004)
