= List of Slovenian mountain climbers =

A list of notable mountaineers from Slovenia:

== Č ==
- Tomo Česen, (1959–)

== F ==
- Jure Franko, (?)
- Marija Frantar, (1956–1991)

== G ==
- Tadej Golob, (?)
- Janja Garnbret

== H ==
- Tomaž Humar, (1969–2009)

== J ==
- Dušan Jelinčič (1953– )
- Klement Jug, (1898–1924)

== K ==
- Marjan Keršič, (?)
- Pavle Kozjek, (1959–2008)
- Julius Kugy, (1858–1944)

== M ==
- Mina Markovič, (1987– )
- Miha Osolin, (2012– )

== P ==
- Marko Prezelj, (1965– )

== S ==
- Janez Skok, (?)

== Š ==
- Igor Škamperle, (1962– )
- Bojan Šrot, (1960– )
- Domen Škofic

== V ==
- Miha Valič, (1978–2008)
- Eva Volk, (2015)

== Z ==
- Janez Zorko, (1937– )
