= List of Slovenian sculptors =

The following is a list of notable Slovenian sculptors:

== A ==
- France Ahčin (1919–1989)

== B ==
- Stojan Batič (1925–2015)
- Jakov Brdar (born 1949)

== D ==
- Lojze Dolinar (1893–1970)

== G ==
- Ron Gomboc (born 1947)
- Andrej Grabrovec (born 1959)

== K ==
- Boris Kalin (1905–1975)
- Marjan Keršič (1920–2003)
- Tone Kralj (1900–1975)

== M ==
- Luka Mislej (1670–1727)
- Miki Muster (1925–2018)

== P ==
- Slobodan Pejić (1944–2006)
- Nikolaj Pirnat (1903–1948)
- Marko Pogačnik (born 1944)

== R ==
- Miranda Rumina (born 1959)

== S ==
- Jakob Savinšek (1922–1961)

== U ==
- Joseph Urbania (1877–1943)

== Z ==
- Ivan Zajec (1869–1952)
- Janez Zorko (born 1937)
- Vlasta Zorko (born 1934)
