= Zorko =

Zorko is both a surname and a given name.

Surname:

- Branko Zorko (born 1967), Croatian middle-distance runner
- Dayne Zorko (born 1989), Australian rules footballer
- Janez Zorko (born 1937), Slovenian sculptor and mountain climber
- Vlasta Zorko (born 1934), Slovenian sculptor
- Zdenko Zorko (born 1950), Croatian handball player
- Zinka Zorko (1936–2019), Slovenian linguist and academic

Given name:

- Zorko Cvetković
- Zorko Čanadi
- Zorko Prelovec (1887–1939), Slovenian composer
