= Podgorje ob Sevnični =

- Location in Slovenia
- Coordinates: 46°3′58.81″N 15°20′27.1″E
- Country: Slovenia
- Traditional region: Styria
- Statistical region: Lower Sava
- Municipality: Sevnica

Area
  - Total: 5.22 km^{2} (2.02 sq mi)
- Elevation: 477.9 m (1,568 ft)

Population (2002)
  - Total: 115

Podgorje ob Sevnični (pronounced [pɔdˈɡoːɾjɛ ɔp ˈseːu̯nitʃni]) is a dispersed settlement in the hills north of Sevnica in east-central Slovenia. The area is part of the historical region of Styria. The Municipality of Sevnica is now included in the Lower Sava Statistical Region.

== Name ==
The name of the settlement was changed from Podgorje to Podgorje ob Sevnični in 1953.

== Church ==
The local church is dedicated to Our Lady of the Rosary (Slovene: sveta Marija Rožnovenska) and belongs to the Parish of Zabukovje. It has a Romanesque core and was restyled in the Baroque in the 17th century.

== Notable people ==
Notable people that were born or lived in Zabukovje nad Sevnico include:

- Štefan Teraž (born 1956), carpentry engineer, businessman
- Janez Zorko (born 1937), sculptor and mountain climber
