= 1925 in Yugoslavia =

- Decades: 1910s; 1920s; 1930s; 1940s
- See also: Other events of 1925; Timeline of Yugoslav history

This article lists events that occurred during 1925 in Kingdom of Serbs, Croats and Slovenes.

== Incumbents ==
- King - Aleksandar Karađorđević
- Prime Minister - Nikola Pašić

== Events ==
- January 5: Stjepan Radić, leader of the Croatian Republican Peasant Party is arrested.
- Elections held on February 8.
- Celebrations held to mark the 1000th anniversary of the coronation of Tomislav of Croatia. Duvno is renamed to Tomislavgrad.

== Sport ==
- National football champion: Jugoslavija Beograd
- National water polo champion: VK Jug Dubrovnik

== Births ==
- Stojan Batič - Slovenian sculptor
- Željko Čajkovski - Croatian footballer

== Deaths ==
- Antun Branko Šimić - Croatian poet (born 1898)
