= Joseph Urbania =

Slovene sculptor

- Born: Josip Vrbanija; February 16, 1877; Ljublijana, Slovenia
- Died: June 10, 1943 (aged 66); Vienna, Austria
- Education: Academy of Fine Arts Vienna
- Known for: Sculpture
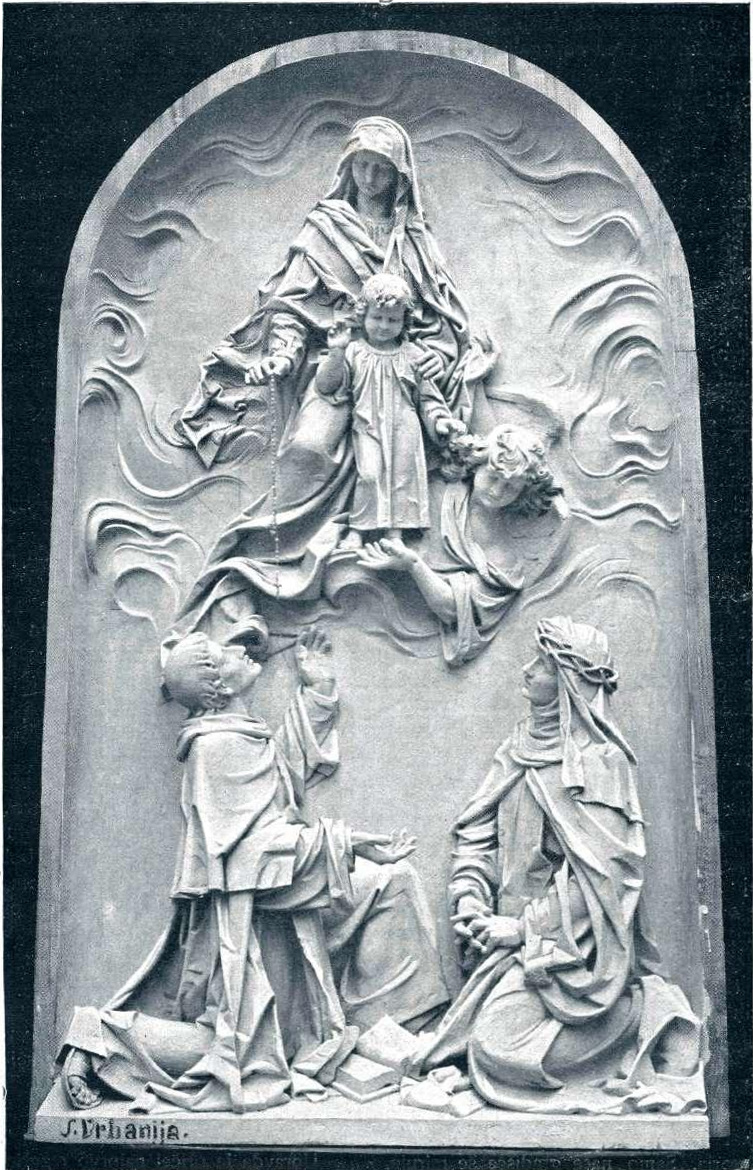
- Movement: Poetical Realism and The Vienna Secession Joseph Urbania: "Mother Mary with Rosary" (1907)

Joseph Urbania (also Josef Urbanija or Josip Vrbanija) (February 16, 1877 – June 10, 1943) was a 20th-century Slovene sculptor, who lived and worked in Austria for much of his life. His media was large-scale wood, stone, bronze and plaster religious sculptures for European cathedrals.

== Early life ==
Joseph Urbania's mother Lucija was a housekeeper in the home of sculptor Franz Ksaver (1821–1888), who was the father of renowned sculptor Ivan Zajec. Urbania's step-father Josip Groselj (1854-1941) was one of his son's early teachers and an artistic assistant and heir to the senior Zajec workshop. Zajec's influence can be seen in much of Urbania's early work.

At age 21, Joseph Urbania joined the Slovenian Army, during which time he was commissioned by Captain H. Wesshuber, to carve a large figure called Homeland (exhibited in Ljubljana, 1903). Upon completion of his military service - and with the savings from his art commissions - Urbania moved to Vienna to study and work. From 1906–1914, with the commissioned support of the Viennese Provincial Committee, Urbania resumed his full-time study of painting, drawing and sculpture at the Heinrich Strehblow Akademie of Arts (now part of the Academy of Fine Arts Vienna) under sculpture Professor Hans Bitterlich (1860-1949).

In a discussion of Urbania and other sculptors of the early 20th Century, Mateja Breščak, the Chief Curator of the National Gallery of Slovenia, said, "Students at the Vienna Academy – after acquiring basic sculpting skills from professors Edmund Hellmer, Caspar von Zumbusch, Karl Kundmann and Hans Bitterlich – were familiarized with religious motifs, but all turned toward secular motifs." Nonetheless, she said, "The sculpture of that time did not merge into artistic societies with common ideological goals." Instead, she said, "The Slovenian sculptors between 1890 and 1920 worked in an academically realistic, neo-baroque, neo-classical style, while they focused on social, mythological, biblical, historical and poetic motifs. The most visible and most influential sculptural personality of this new era is certainly Auguste Rodin, who also influenced our sculptors."

== Career ==
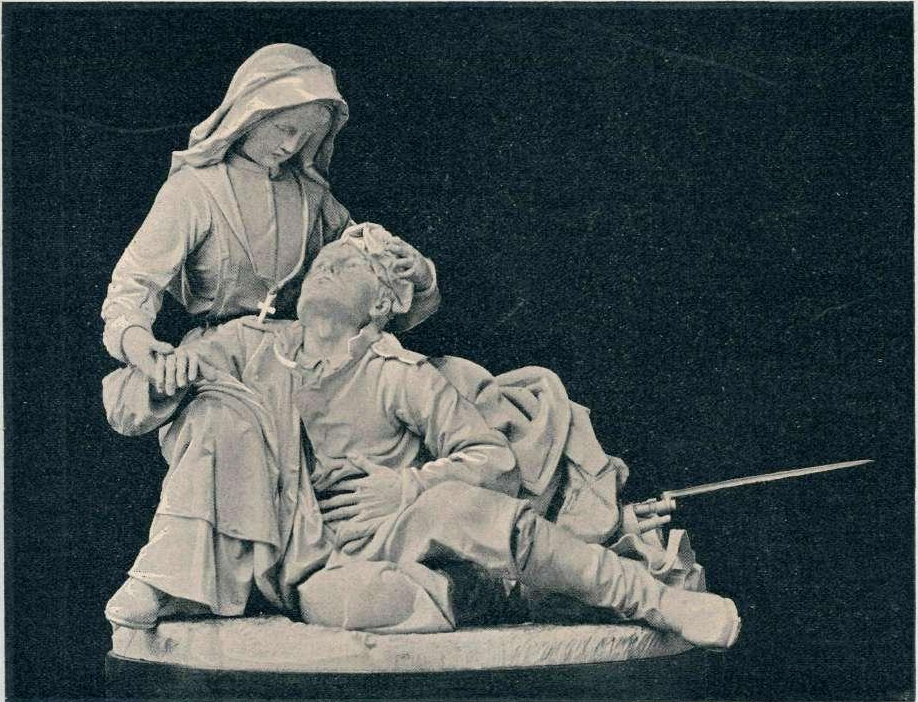
Joseph Urbania: After the Battle (1905)

While living in Vienna, Urbania produced commissioned sculpture and paintings and exhibited his work there. He began to be recognized publicly for his achievements and received the Gundel Art Prize for sculpture in 1910 and the Preleuthner Prize in 1912. Urbania lived briefly in Sarajevo in 1915-1918 where, together with a team of artists, he created a monument to WWI soldiers at the Kovaci Cemetery. After the war, he relocated permanently to Vienna where he lived and worked until his death in 1943.

Before WWI, Urbania began to produce anti-war allegory works. His massive wood-carving The Last Battle (1905), a scene from the Russo-Japanese War, was donated to the Dežel Museum in 1906 and is now on display at the National Gallery of Slovenia. Other anti-war pieces include: Hail Caesar (1915) After the Battle (1908) and Hannibal at the Gates (1908). His large carved-wood relief Z Doma (or Far from Home, 1908) was a sentimental self-portrait framed in branches and leaves.

In 1914, Urbania began but never finished the gigantic plaster figures Spring and Effort (also called Water and Electricity) for the cancelled Provincial House in Ljubljana (the plasters are currently disassembled in the National Gallery). His figure Passages of the Danube was commissioned for the Michaelerplatz, in Vienna, but was removed during WWII and is now missing.

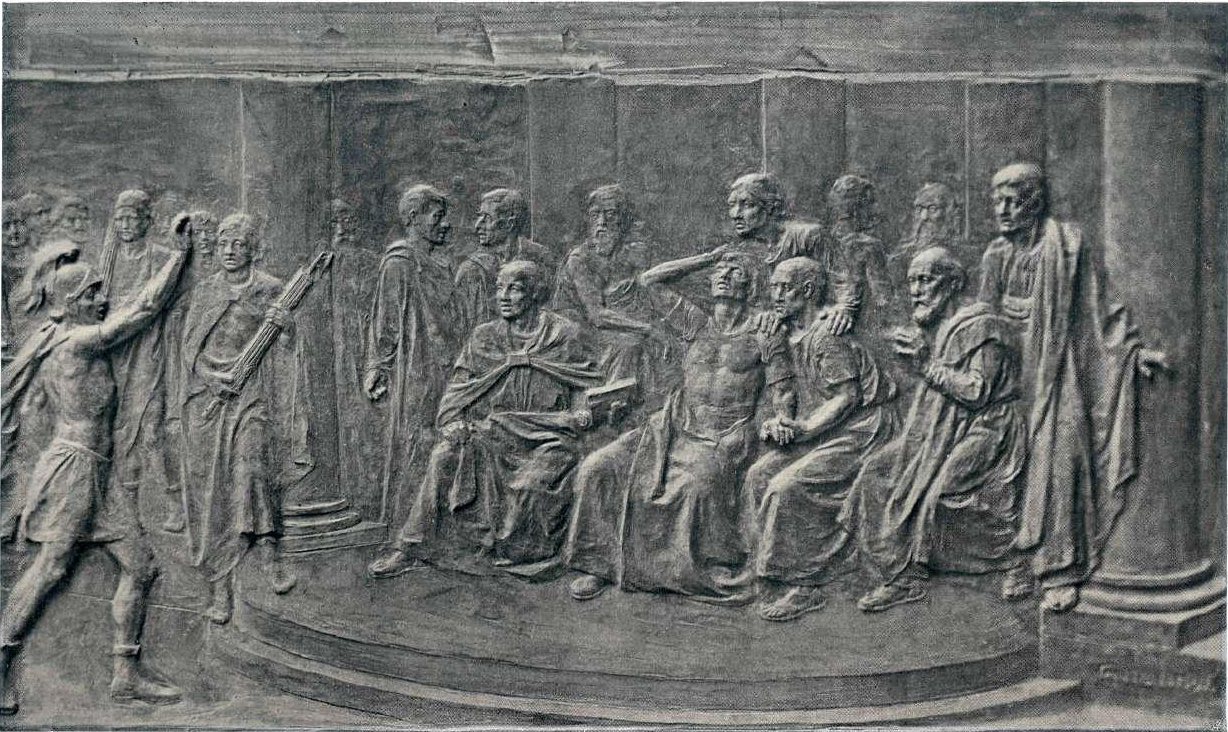
Joseph Urbania: Hannibal at the Gates (1908)

A devout Roman Catholic, Urbania was best known for the sculptures he created for cathedrals and monasteries. Two monumental plaster reliefs – Christ Healing and Daniel in the Lion’s Den – were later moved to the National Gallery of Slovenia in Ljubljana. Small bronze copies of these popular pieces occasionally appear for public sale. Other religious-themed pieces include: a maple wood carving of Christus Ascending (1931, now in Kenosha, Wisconsin); several marble statues at the Parish Church of St. Elisabeth, including Immaculata and Two Cherubim (with sculptor Alojzij Progar); St. Hubertus (1909) and St. Anthony and Child (1934); and an important burial chapel piece called Resurrection (1910, made by the artists' group at the Grošlje Workshop for a burial chapel in Škofja Loka), sometimes credited as the sole work of Ivan Zajec.

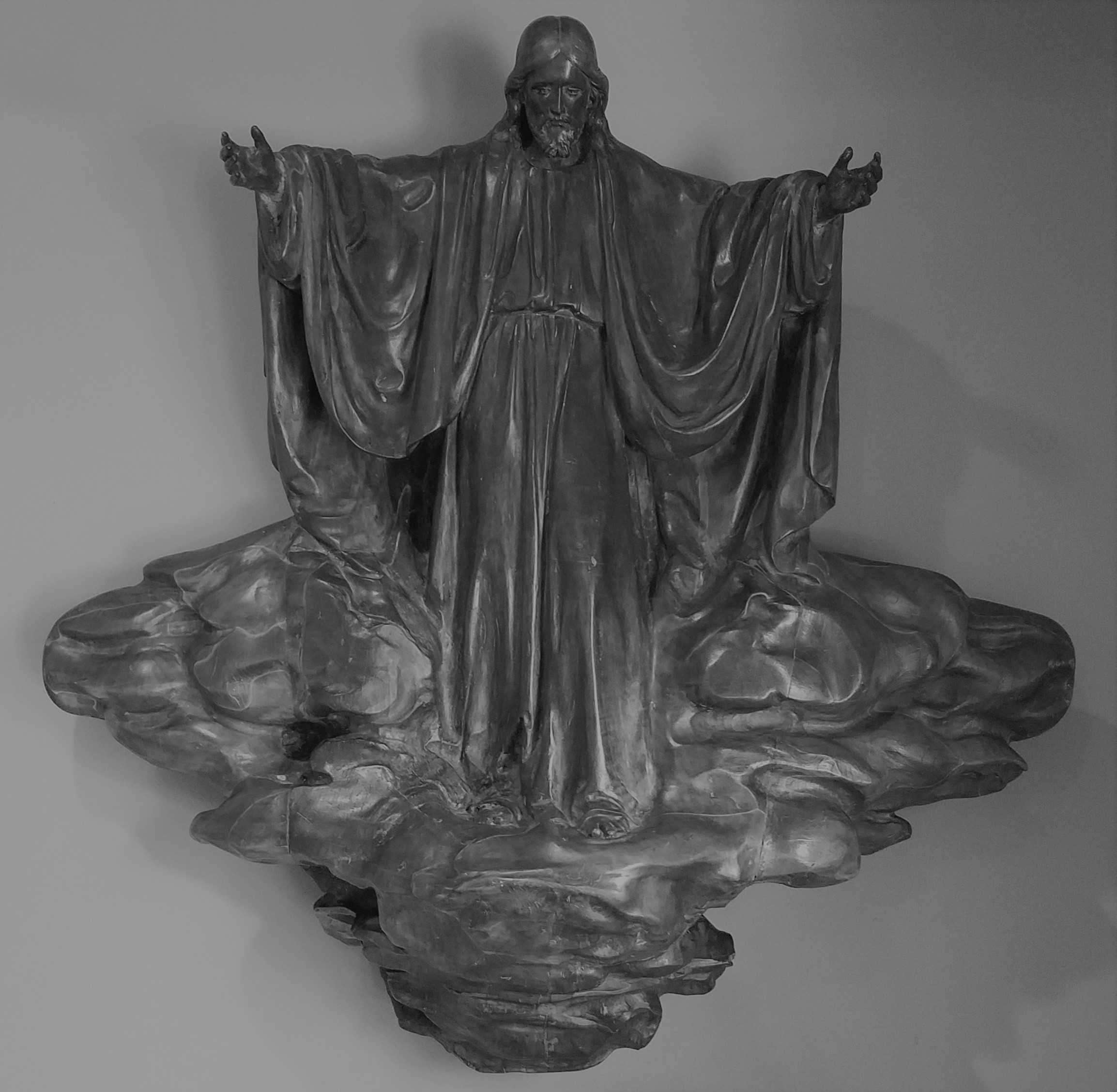
Joseph Urbania: Christus Ascending (1931)

Other statues and reliefs include: The Carrier of the Vase (1909); Absolvo Te (1910); Rokoborca (The Wrestlers) in 1913; Danica-Zarji (1913); Sejalec (1914); Monument to the Fallen (WWI Soldiers Cemetery in Sarajevo) in 1918; a carved wood statue In Nature (Flying Left) in 1922; a marble Holy Family (1926 – now in Chicago); Turn (1930); a bronze figure Girl with Grapes and Bear (1935); and a pear wood carved Mother (Ladies with a Child) in 1939.

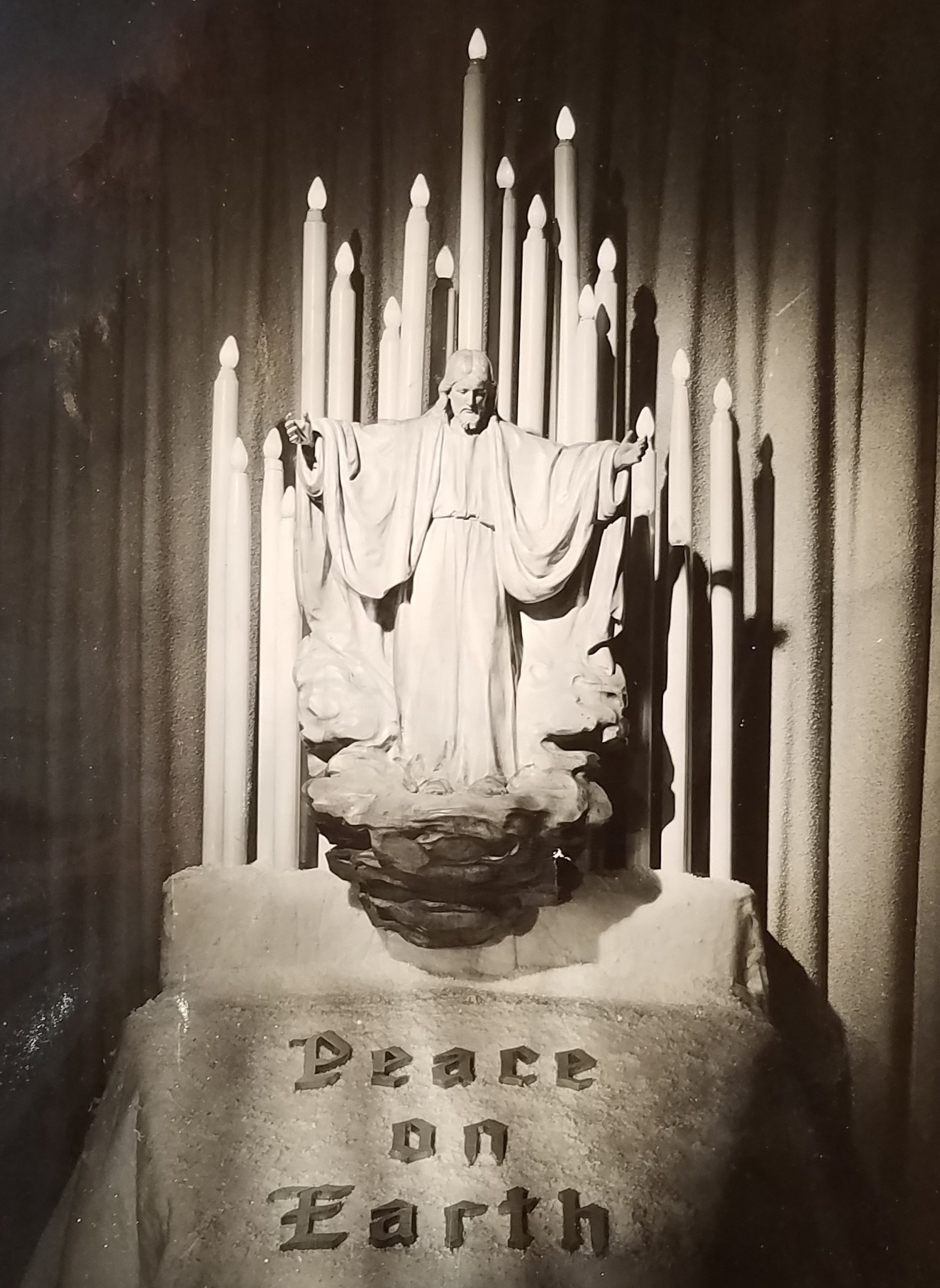
Joseph Urbania: Christus Ascending (1931) as it appeared in the home of Oscar U. Zerk in 1945

Completing a portion of his work as part of an unsigned team of artists at the Grošelj Workshop in Ljubljana Urbania's contributions stand out nonetheless for the vividness of his figures, the stunning naturalism, the realism of the human body, plainly beautiful faces, idealized branches and leaves, and exaggerated emotion, which can be seen in all his subsequent work. His unsigned reliefs and statues – at St. Mohor and Fortunat Cathedral in Groblje pri Prekopi , Angels on the Great Altar in the Ljubljana Cathedral at St. Cyril and Methodius Square, and Mother of God with St. Dominic and Rosary (1906) at Loško Potok – were all created by Urbania as the lead sculptor in the Groblje pri Prekopi Workshop.

Urbania's Christus Ascending was featured in the home of wealthy American Industrialist Oscar U. Zerk. The 1931 white maple carved work became internationally famous in 1954, when thieves broke into Zerk's Wisconsin mansion and stole more than $200,000 worth of paintings, gems and art. The thieves were captured by the FBI, and the art returned.

== Commentary ==
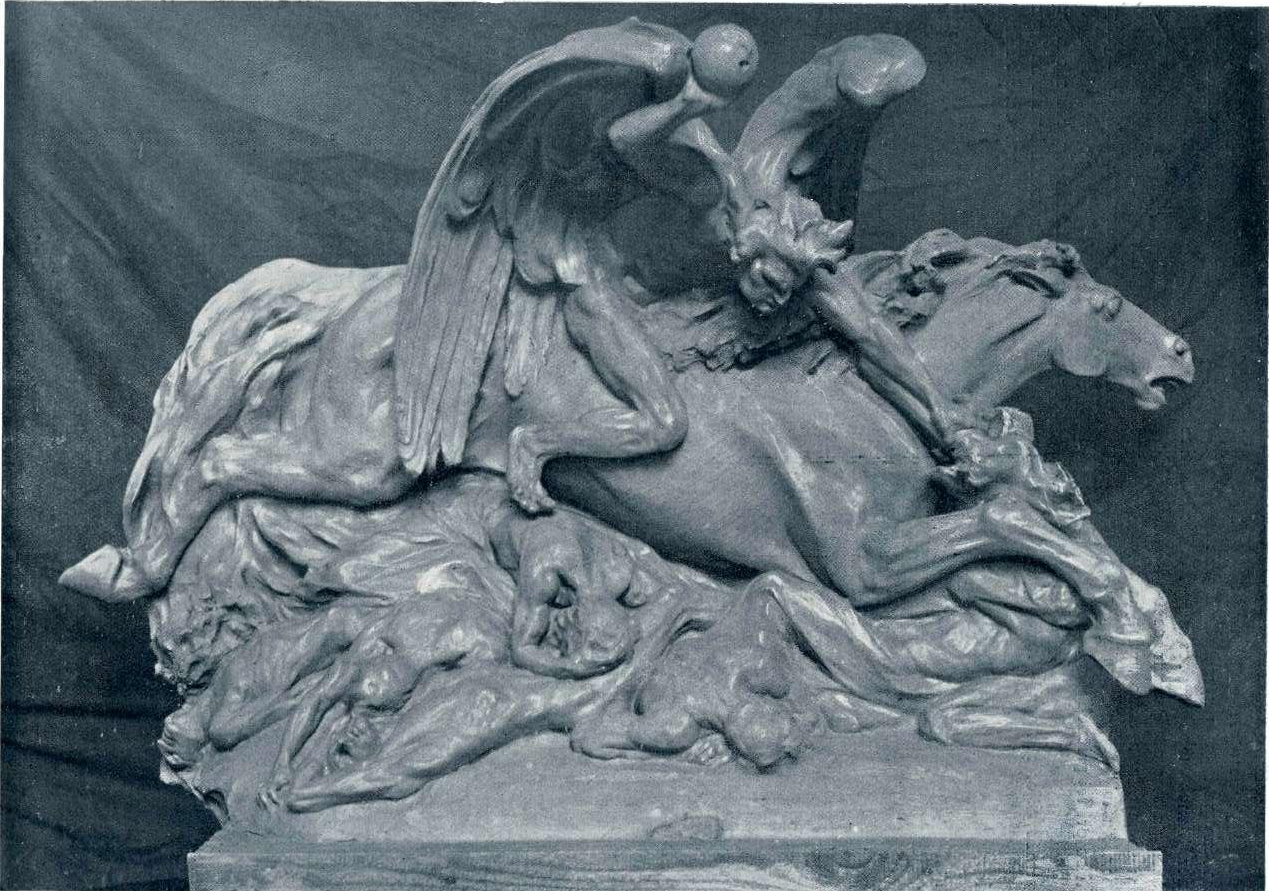
Joseph Urbania: Potop (1913)

Reviews of exhibitions may be found in the Slovenska biografija: The Last Battle, 1905 (Lj., See DS 1905, 325; S 1905, No. 39, 67; SN 1905, No. 68; LZ 1906, 383); Z Doma, 1908 (painter in Vienna, see S 1908, No. 119); The Carrier of the Vase, 1909 (ib., See S 1909, No. 160); Hanibal Ante Portas and Sv. Hubertus, 1909 (both on the first art exhibition in Jp.).

According to the Slovenian Biographical Lexicon, Urbania's contemporaries described his work (see V. Levstik, LZ 1909, 528, as "possessing a happy warmth and homey simplicity, although the technique is well-schooled and immaculate." Still others (F. Kozak in connection with the Krekov monument's draft, LZ 1918, 295), argued, "much of his art is idealized and depicted in a kind of modern Baroque and poetic realism." More critically, some considered his work "old-fashioned" (S. Mikuž, Um 1939/40, 10-5), and some said, "he blushed between folk art and visions of great pathos, although his talent was not up to date."

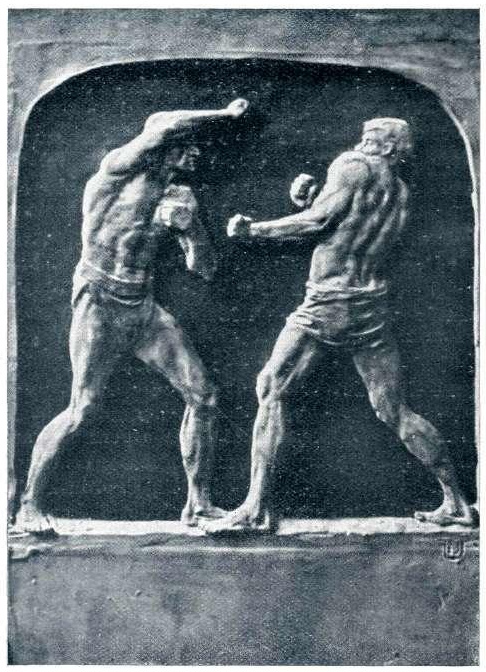
Joseph Urbania: Rokoborca (The Wrestlers) (1913)
