= Dušan Jelinčič =

Slovenian writer and journalist

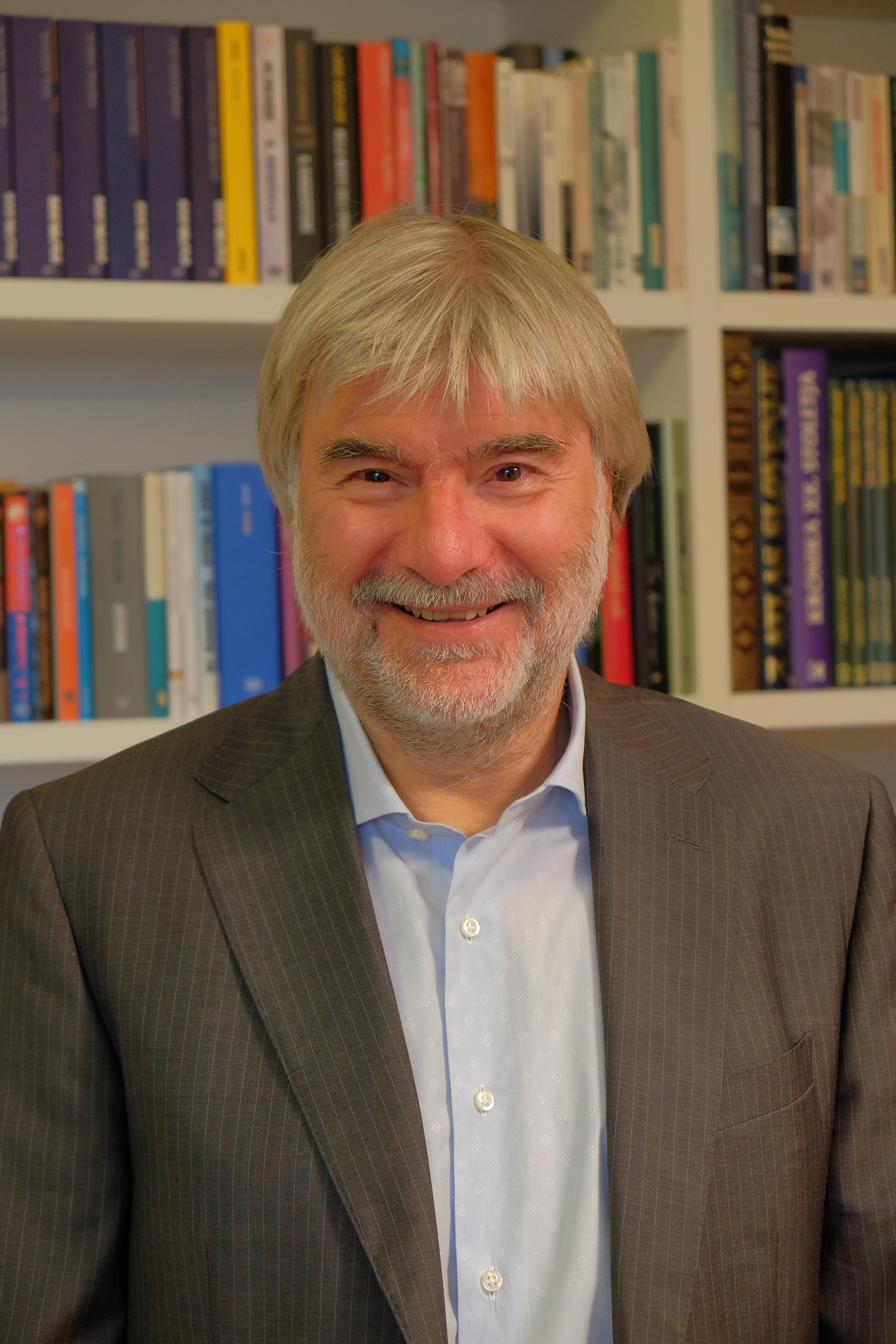
Dušan Jelinčič

Dušan Jelinčič (born 1953) is a writer and a journalist from the community of Slovene minority in Italy from Trieste, Italy. He is also an Alpine style mountaineer and the first mountaineer from Trieste who ever conquered an over-8000 m high Himalayan peak.

== Life ==
He was born in an influential Slovene intellectual family in Trieste; his father, Zorko Jelinčič, was among the co-founders of the militant anti-fascist organization TIGR, and a close personal friend of prominent authors such as Vladimir Bartol and Klement Jug.

In his college years, he visited most of the world, traveling as backpacker and also lived for a year in a kibbutz in Israel. At the University of Trieste he graduated from history under the mentorship of Jože Pirjevec.

== Work ==
=== Journalism, literature, and alpinism ===
He has worked in the Slovene language section of the regional RAI service for Friuli-Venezia Giulia. Dušan Jelinčič has also written numerous essays, published in mostly Slovene literary journals, such as Sodobnost and Nova revija. In 2001, he wrote a play about a planned attack on Benito Mussolini by TIGR members, Upor obsojenih oz Kobarid 38' – Kronika atentata, that was put on stage a decade later by Slovene theatre in Trieste.

In his book 'Starry Nights' (Slovene: Zvezdnate noči), he wrote about his experiences in the 1986 Slovenian expedition to the Karakoram mountain range, that conquered the 8047 m high Broad Peak. It was published as serial in Primorski dnevnik, and then it was translated as Le notti stellate into Italian, it became a best seller in Italy and won four literary prizes (including the international Acerbi Prize). Among Jelinčič's other works, the most famous is 'Night in the Docks' (Tema v pomolu), the Italian translation of which (Scacco nel buio) won the prize Scritture di Frontiera in 2006, ex aequo with Predrag Matvejević.

Jelinčič's writings are part of the tradition of Slovene mountaineer travelogues, which has been an important current within Slovene literature since the fin-de-siecle period. One of the most important centres of this literary production has been Trieste and the nearby areas of the Slovenian Littoral, with authors as Henrik Tuma, Julius Kugy, Klement Jug, Tone Svetina, Igor Škamperle, and Zorko Jelinčič, Dušan's father.

In 2003, he conquered the 8035 m high Gasherbrum 2.
