= Ocizla =

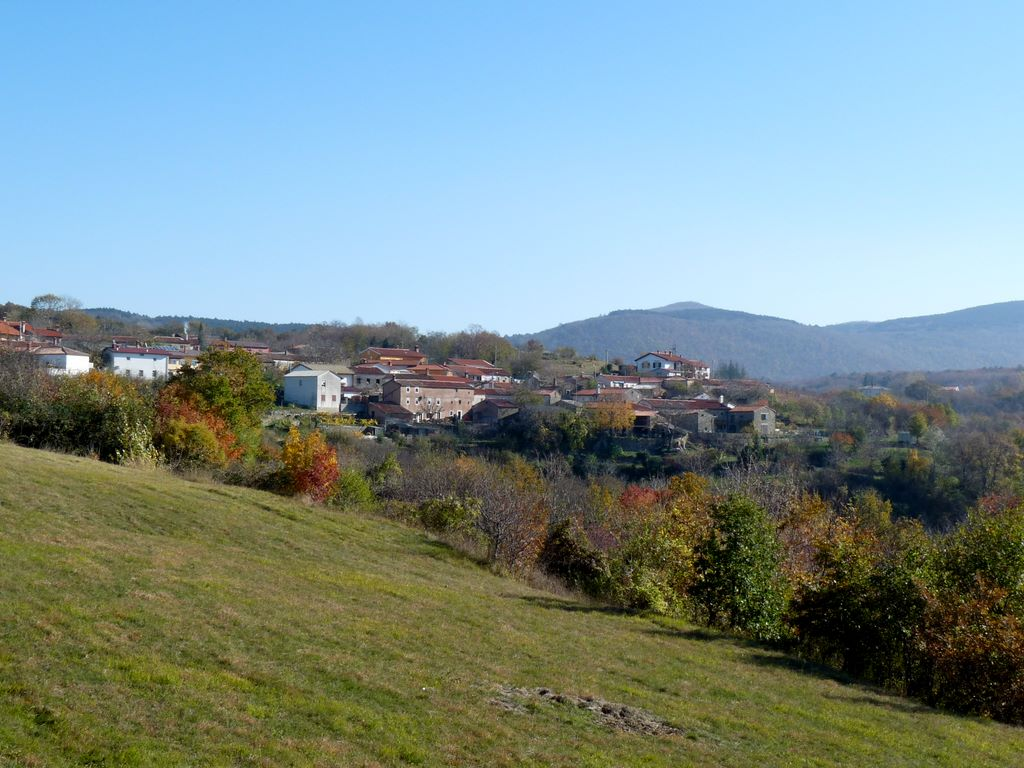

- Location in Slovenia
- Coordinates: 45°35′26.17″N 13°54′29.29″E
- Country: Slovenia
- Traditional region: Littoral
- Statistical region: Coastal–Karst
- Municipality: Hrpelje-Kozina

Area
  - Total: 3.06 km^{2} (1.18 sq mi)
- Elevation: 443.1 m (1,454 ft)

Population (2002)
  - Total: 101

Ocizla (pronounced [ɔˈtsiːzla]; Italian: Occisla) is a small village in the Municipality of Hrpelje-Kozina in the Littoral region of Slovenia, near the border with Italy

The local church is dedicated to Mary Magdalene and belongs to the Parish of Klanec.

The Italian writer Scipio Slataper wrote his masterpiece Il mio Carso (My Karst) in Ocizla.

Between 1933 and 1940, a cell of the anti-Fascist insurgent organization TIGR was active in the village.

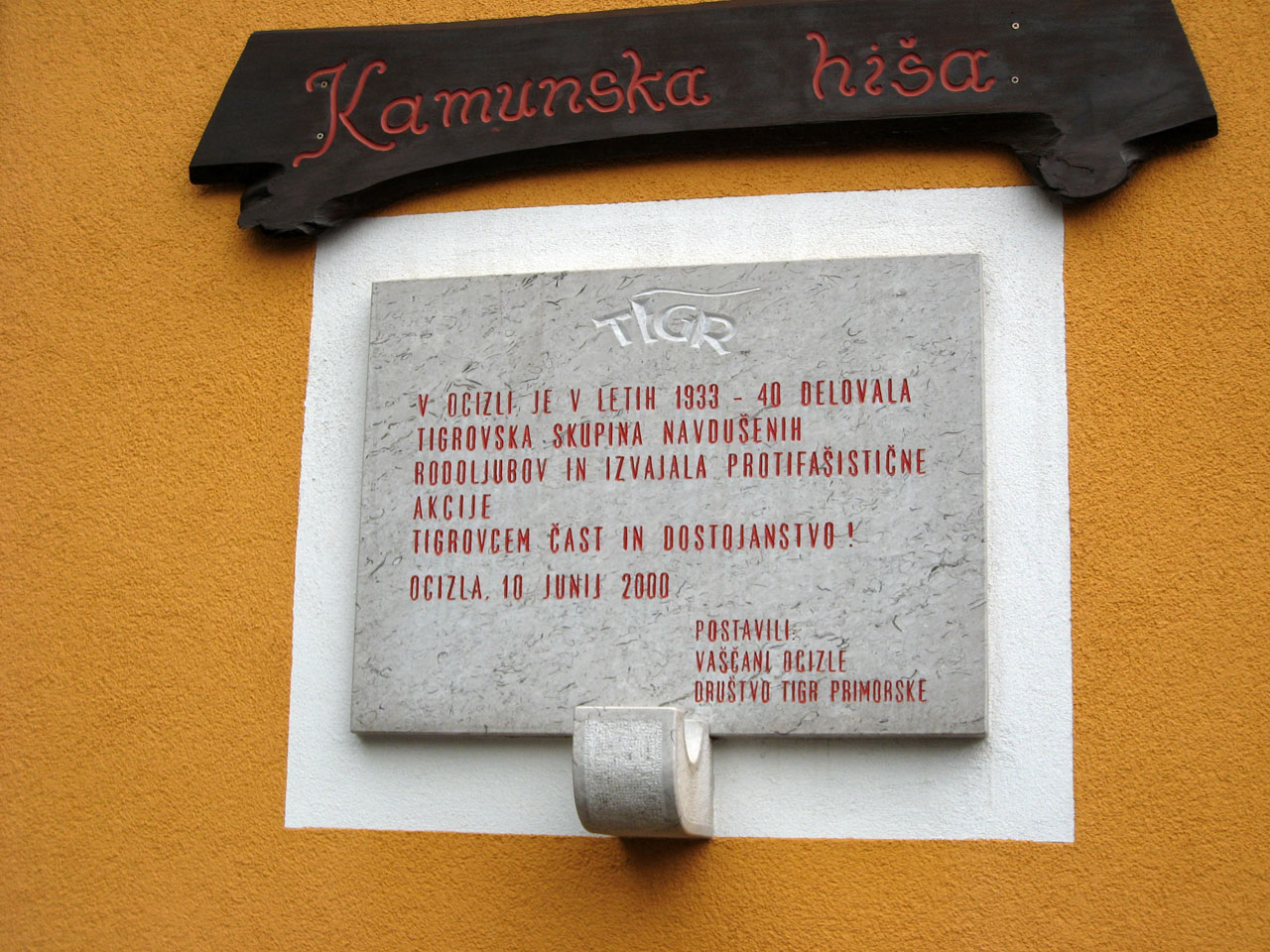
Memorial plaque to TIGR activists in Ocizla
