= 1924 in Yugoslavia =

- Decades: 1910s; 1920s; 1930s; 1940s
- See also: Other events of 1924; Timeline of Yugoslav history

The following lists events that happened during 1924 in the Kingdom of Serbs, Croats and Slovenes.

== Incumbents ==
- King: Alexander I
- Prime Minister:
  - until 28 July: Nikola Pašić
  - 28 July-6 November: Ljubomir Davidović
  - starting 6 November: Nikola Pašić

== Events ==
=== January ===
- January 2 – The Bulgarian government gave former King Ferdinand, who had been living in exile since 1918, permission to return to Sofia while Yugoslavia immediately sends an ultimatum objecting to the move.
- January 4 – Yugoslavia sends another sharp note to Bulgaria saying it would not accept the return of Ferdinand from exile or any further provocations. Newspapers in Belgrade clamored for war.
