= Marija Frantar =

Slovenian alpinist

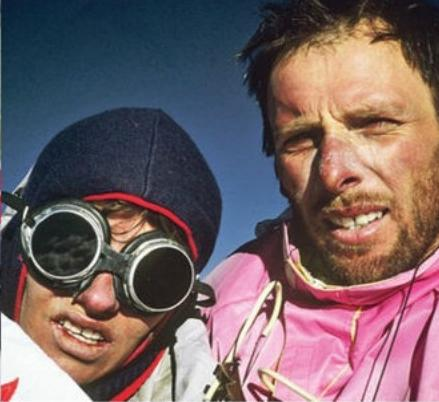
- Marija Frantar (left) and Jože Rozman on Kangchenjunga

Personal information
- Native name: Marija "Mariča" Sabolek Frantar
- Born: Marija Sabolek; 29 March 1956 Ljubljana, Socialist Republic of Slovenia, Yugoslavia
- Died: 3 May 1991 (aged 35) Kangchenjunga, Nepal
- Occupations: Mountaineer, Geographer

Climbing career
- Type of climber: Alpine climbing; Ice climbing; Rock climbing
- Updated on 18 June 2024

Marija "Mariča" Sabolek Frantar (1956–1991), was a Slovenian alpinist who was one of the country's most successful mountaineers. She was the second Slovene woman to summit an eight-thousander. In 1990, she received the Stanko Bloudek award, Slovenia's highest state honor for sport for her achievements in mountaineering.

== Alpine climbing ==
Frantar was known for alpine style ascents, many at speed and without supplementary oxygen. Mariča completed approximately 600 ascents before her death at age 35, with climbs across the Dolomites, the Wilder Kaiser and the Central Alps, Tian Shan, the Pamirs and the Himalayas.

"I look for danger, not because of death, but because of life, which is the richest and most beautiful there in the steep walls and overhangs. This is my life and a great experience."

Frantar disappeared on 3 May 1991, approximately 150 meters from the summit on Kangchenjunga, together with fellow climber Jožet Rozman. When she died, she was attempting to be the first woman to summit the third-highest mountain in the world.

== Notable climbs ==
- Independence Peak (6,974 m), Pamir Mountains. In 1979, she led an expedition team in the Pamir Mountains to climb Independence Peak, via a demanding route that included climbing ice waterfalls. Marija and her team climbed a new route on the south face of the range (19,691 feet) and ascended to its previously unclimbed summit. The team made five high-altitude camps, and summited the peak in six days, reaching the summit on 4 August 1979.
- Ismoil Somoni (formerly Pik Komunizma) (7,495 m), Pamir Mountains. In 1982, Frantar led the first Slovenian female mountaineering expedition to the Pamirs aiming to conquer the highest peak of the then USSR and set a new Yugoslav women's mountaineering record. On Ismoil Somoni (then known as Pik Komunizma), the expedition climbed the north wall and climbed the Borodkin Column. This was followed by a 300-meter descent to the plateau, an ascent to the pre-summit of Pik Dushanbe and an ascent to the very top of Pik Komunizma at an altitude of 7,495 m along the first route. After five days of climbing to the top of the seven-thousander, the expedition reached the Yugoslav women's height record with the ascent.
- Annapurna South, (7,219 m), Himalayas In 1986, Frantar led the first Yugoslav women's expedition to the Himalayas. The groundbreaking expedition aimed to climb the Japanese route of the southwest ridge of Annapurna South. Due to poor weather conditions, the team had to abandon their summit attempt at 6050 meters, yet the expedition was groundbreaking for being one of the first, if not the first all-female expedition to the Himalayas. In this ascent, Frantar climbed without oxygen.
- Nanga Parbat (8,125 m), Himalayas. In 1990, Frantar and Jože Rozman summited via Schell's 1976 route via the Rupal wall, running along the NW ridge of the mountain. In her climb, Marija Frantar became the eighth woman to summit Nanga Parbat and the first to summit from this route.
- Eiger (3,970 m), Swiss Alps. In 1990, Frantar and climbing partner Dare Juhant climbed the north face of the Eiger, and she became the first Slovenian woman to ascend the north face of the Eiger.
- Kangchenjunga (8,586 m), Himalayas. In May 1991, Frantar was part of a combined Polish-Slovenian team climbing Kangchenjunga via three different summits. Frantar was aiming to become the first woman to summit the eight-thousander. The expedition team was split between the summit attempts. Frantar and Jože Rozman made good progress toward the summit, however adverse weather conditions began to slow their ascent. The pair became exhausted and began to suffer from snow blindness. They messaged base camp 150m below the summit that they could no longer continue. At the advice of base camp, they began their descent. Exhausted, the climbers slipped from the mountain at 8,000m, incurring fatal injuries. Marija's body was found at 7,500m. She was 35 years old. Members of the climbing party buried both climbers in a crevasse on Kangchenjunga.

== Awards and honours ==
- 1990: Bloudkova priznanja, Slovenia's highest awards for sport
