= Zabukovje nad Sevnico =

- Location in Slovenia
- Coordinates: 46°3′14.14″N 15°22′1.27″E
- Country: Slovenia
- Traditional region: Styria
- Statistical region: Lower Sava
- Municipality: Sevnica

Area
  - Total: 8.5 km^{2} (3.3 sq mi)
- Elevation: 550.9 m (1,807 ft)

Population (2002)
  - Total: 179

Zabukovje nad Sevnico (pronounced [zaˈbuːkɔu̯jɛ nat ˈseːu̯nitsɔ]) is a dispersed settlement in the hills north of Sevnica in central Slovenia. The area is part of the historical region of Styria. The Municipality of Sevnica is now included in the Lower Sava Statistical Region.

== Name ==
The name of the settlement was changed from Zabukovje to Zabukovje nad Sevnico in 1953.

== Church ==
The local parish church is dedicated to Saint Leonard and belongs to the Roman Catholic Diocese of Celje. It dates to the 17th century.

== Notable people ==
Notable people that were born or lived in Zabukovje nad Sevnico include:

- Alojz Kolman, nom de guerre Marok (1911–1944), officer, National Hero of Yugoslavia
- Janez Zorko (born 1937), sculptor and mountain climber
