= Julius Kugy =

Slovene mountaineer

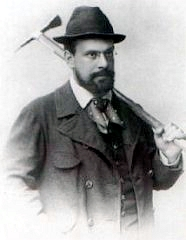
- Kugy about 1890
- Born: 19 July 1858; Gorizia, Gorizia and Gradisca, Austrian Empire
- Died: 5 February 1944 (aged 85); Trieste, Kingdom of Italy
- Occupations: Mountaineer writer botanist
- Writing career
- Notable work: Aus dem Leben eines Bergsteigers

Julius Kugy (19 July 1858 – 5 February 1944) was a mountaineer, writer, botanist, humanist, lawyer and officer of Slovenian descent. He wrote mostly in German. He is renowned for his travelogues from opening up the Julian Alps, in which he reflected on the relationship between man, nature, and culture. He opposed competing nationalist ideologies in the Alpe-Adria region, insisting on the need of peaceful co-existence among Slovene, Italian and German peoples.

== Biography ==
Julius Kugy was born to a Slovenian family in Gorizia, then part of the Austrian Empire (now in Italy). His father Paul was a farmer from Lind (Lipa) near Arnoldstein in the Carinthian Gail Valley. His mother Giulia was the daughter of the Slovene poet Janez Vesel. The surname Kugy has the same origin as the surnames Kugi, Kogoj, and Kogej. Kugy was educated in a multilingual environment: from an early age he was fluent in three of the four languages of his native Gorizia and Gradisca region: Italian, German, and Friulian. Kugy did not speak Slovene, as he also writes in his book Aus dem Leben eines Bergsteigers. However, he did later learn to read Slovene. During his childhood he would spend the summers in his father's native village of Lind, where he developed his interest in nature and mountains.

Julius attended the German-language secondary school in Trieste and continued his studies at the University of Vienna, graduating in law in 1882. Upon returning to Trieste, he took over the management of the import-export company Pfeifer & Kugy, co-founded by his father.

He explored large portions of the Eastern Alps, dedicating most of his mountaineering career to climbing in the Julian Alps, where he discovered and marked more than 50 new routes. Local guides helped him climb many a previously unconquered peak in the Julian Alps: he became famous for climbing Škrlatica and Jôf di Montasio.

In addition to mountaineering, Kugy was interested in many other subjects such as literature, botany and music. One of the riddles he tried to solve was a mysterious plant species Scabiosa trenta, described by Belsazar Hacquet and later proven by Anton Kerner von Marilaun to be a specimen of the already known Cephalaria leucantha. Together with his friend Albert Bois de Chesne he created the Juliana Alpine Botanical Garden near Bovec. He was among the founders of two amateur music societies in Trieste: the Philharmonic Society and the Palestrinian Chorus. He also donated an organ to the Mekhitarist church in Trieste.

After Italy declared war on Austria-Hungary in 1915, Kugy volunteered to the Austro-Hungarian Army. In the Battles of the Isonzo his mountaineering knowledge and experience proved to be extremely valuable and he was promoted to the rank of Second Lieutenant. He was demobilized after the Battle of Caporetto.

After the war he closed down his company and dedicated his time to writing and lecturing throughout the Slovene and German speaking lands.

During World War II, Kugy rescued several Slovene alpine climbers from the Dachau concentration camp, and he collaborated with the Slovene Partisan underground resistance in Trieste. He died in Trieste in 1944. He was interred in the central city cemetery.

== Literary work and influence ==
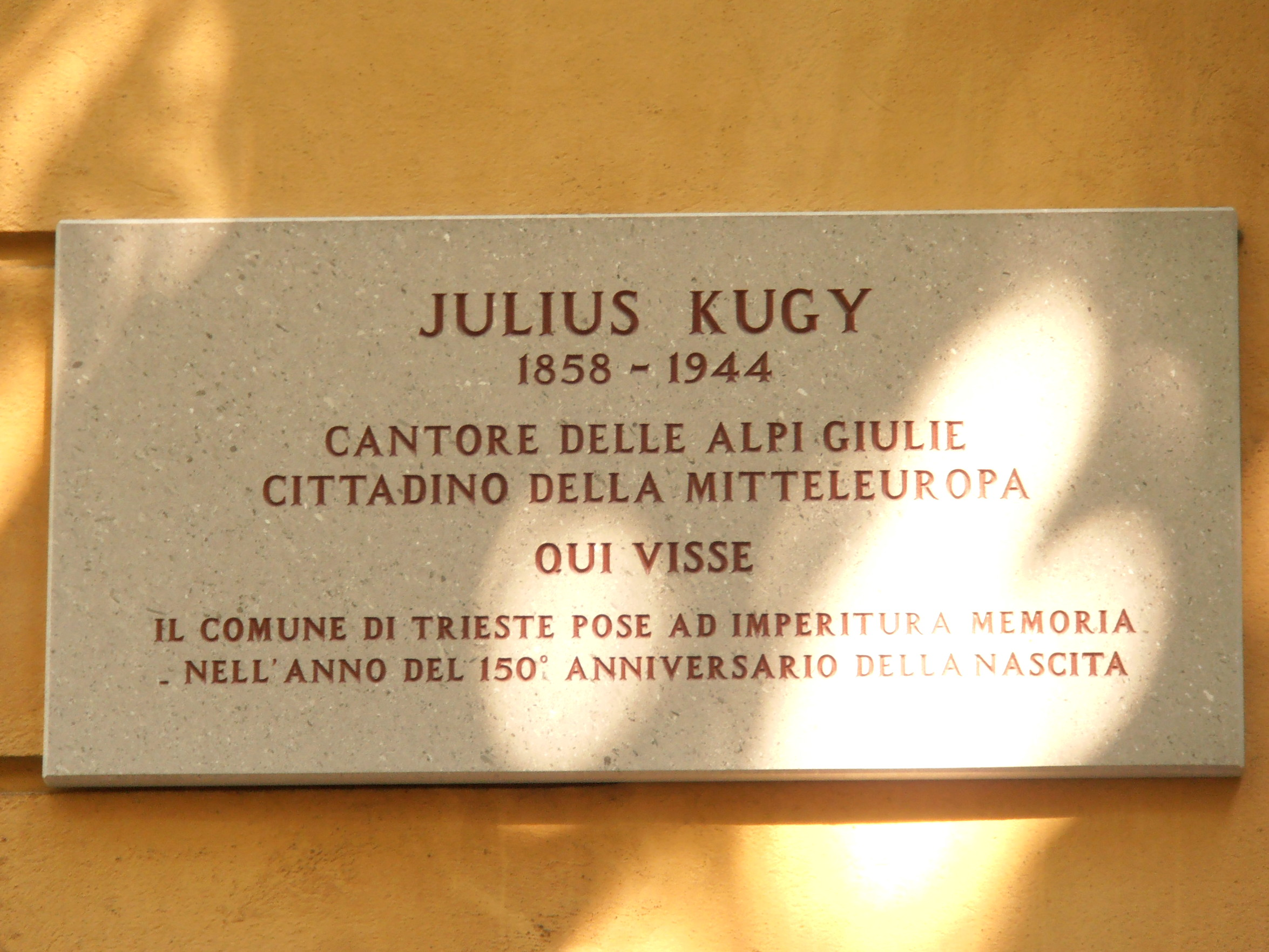
Memorial plaque in Trieste

Together with Henrik Tuma, Kugy is considered the father of modern mountaineering in the Julian Alps. He wrote several books based on his experiences, in which he expressed his humanist ideals and the love for nature. His books were very influential and created a specific genre of mountaineering literature within Slovene literature. His neo-Romantic style, which merged scientific and naturalist descriptions of nature and popular customs with a highly personalized reflections, influenced several important authors, mostly from the Slovenian Littoral. Among those influenced by Kugy's poetic and reflective mountaineering travelogues were Klement Jug, Vladimir Bartol, Igor Škamperle and Dušan Jelinčič. He was also influential in some Italian-speaking circles of Trieste. Among his admirers were the writers Giani Stuparich, Claudio Magris, Livio Isaak Sirovich, Marco Albino Ferrari and Paolo Rumiz.

There is a monument to Julius Kugy in the Trenta Valley near the road to Vršič Pass with a sculpture of Kugy by Jakob Savinšek. A number of mountain routes are also named after him, including the famous one in Aurisina near Duino.

In 2008, a Slovenian postal stamp was dedicated to him.

== Major works ==
- Aus dem Leben eines Bergsteigers ("The Life of a Mountaineer". Munich, 1925).
- Arbeit, Musik, Berge ("Work, Music, Mountains". Munich, 1931).
- Die Julischen Alpen im Bilde ("The Julian Alps in Images". Graz, 1933).
- Alpine Pilgrimage (1st Edition (English) 1934). Translated by H E G Tyndale.
- Anton Ditzinger, ein Bergführerleben ("Anton Ditzinger: The Life of a Mountain Guide". Graz, 1935).
- Fünf Jahrhunderte Triglav ("Five Centuries of Triglav").
- Im göttliche Lächeln des Monte Rosa ("The Divine Smile of Monte Rosa").
- Aus vergangener Zeit ("From Days Past". Graz, 1943).
