= Kraljeva hči =

1997 novel by Igor Škamperle

- Author: Igor Škamperle
- Language: Slovenian
- Publication date: 1997
- Publication place: Slovenia

Kraljeva hči is a novel by Slovenian author Igor Škamperle. It was first published in 1997.

== See also ==
- List of Slovenian novels
