= Miha Valič =

Slovenian mountaineer (1978–2008)

- Born: November 4, 1978; Ljubljana, SR Slovenia, Yugoslavia
- Died: October 5, 2008 (aged 29); Cho Oyu, Nepal
- Occupation: Mountaineer
- Website: www.mihavalic.net

Miha Valič (4 November 1978 – 5 October 2008) was a Slovenian mountaineer. He was the first person to ascend every 4000-meter peak in the Alps in one winter session. The Alps marathon was completed in 102 days.

Valič attended 10 expeditions, mostly in Yosemite, Patagonia and the Himalayas. In 2003, Valič spent two months in the Yosemite Valley with Matjaž Jeran, where they free climbed the El Capitan rock formation's Freerider route (1200 m, 5.12d/13a). A year later, he made the first alpine-style ascent on route Eternal Flame in Trango group with Tomaž Jakofčič and Klemen Mali. Valič was also a successful sport climber. He climbed routes up to 8b+.

On 5 October 2008, Valič died while descending Cho Oyu after a successful ascent.
