= Groblje pri Prekopi =

- Location in Slovenia
- Coordinates: 45°51′12.5″N 15°21′43.04″E
- Country: Slovenia
- Traditional region: Lower Carniola
- Statistical region: Southeast Slovenia
- Municipality: Šentjernej

Area
  - Total: 1.87 km^{2} (0.72 sq mi)
- Elevation: 164 m (538 ft)

Population (2002)
  - Total: 199
- Postal code: 8310

Groblje pri Prekopi (pronounced [ˈɡɾoːbljɛ pɾi ˈpɾeːkɔpi]) is a settlement northeast of Šentjernej in southeastern Slovenia. The area is part of the traditional region of Lower Carniola. It is now included in the Southeast Slovenia Statistical Region.

== Name ==
The name of the settlement was changed from Groblje to Groblje pri Prekopi in 1953.

== Cultural heritage ==
The local church, built in a walled enclosure in the centre of the village, is dedicated to Saint Martin and belongs to the Parish of Šentjernej. It was mentioned in written documents dating to 1526, but owes its current Baroque style to a refurbishment in the early 17th century. Its main altar dates to the 19th century and the side altars are from the 17th century.

An archaeological site near the settlement has yielded numerous Roman finds with building foundations and a necropolis with coins from the 2nd to 6th centuries AD, and it has been suggested that it is the site of the Roman waystation Crucium on the Roman road from Emona to Siscium.
