= TIGR =

Militant organization in Italy (1927–1941)

TIGR (an acronym of the place-names Trst, Istra, Gorica, and Reka), fully the Revolutionary Organization of the Julian March T.I.G.R. (Slovene: Revolucionarna organizacija Julijske krajine T.I.G.R.), was a militant anti-fascist and insurgent organization established as a response to the Fascist Italianization of the Slovene and Croat people on part of the former Austro-Hungarian territories that became part of Italy after the First World War, and were known at the time as the Julian March. It is considered one of the first anti-fascist resistance movements in Europe. It was active between 1927 and 1941.

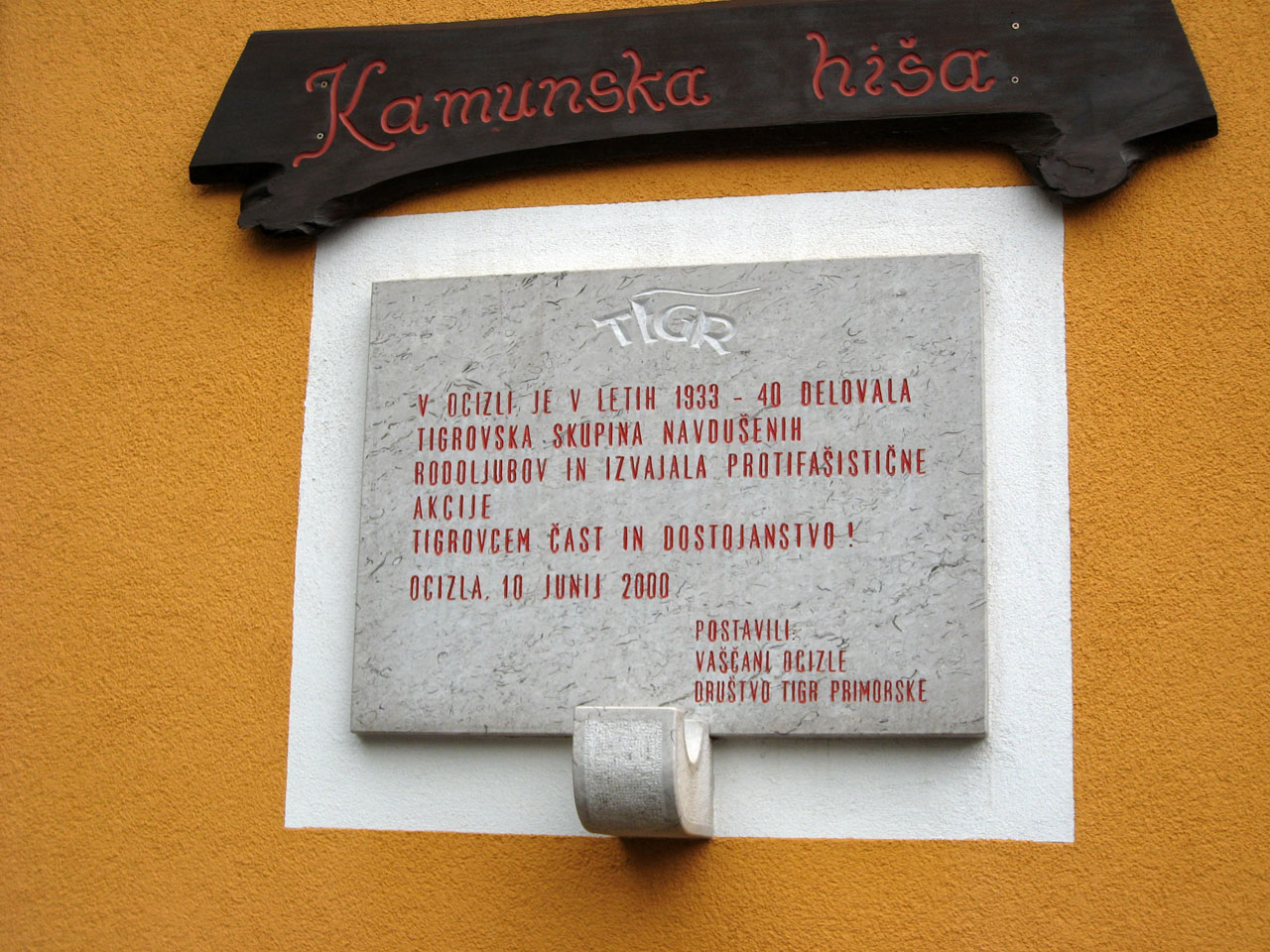
Memorial plaque to TIGR activists in Ocizla on the Karst Plateau who were active in the 1930s

== Background ==
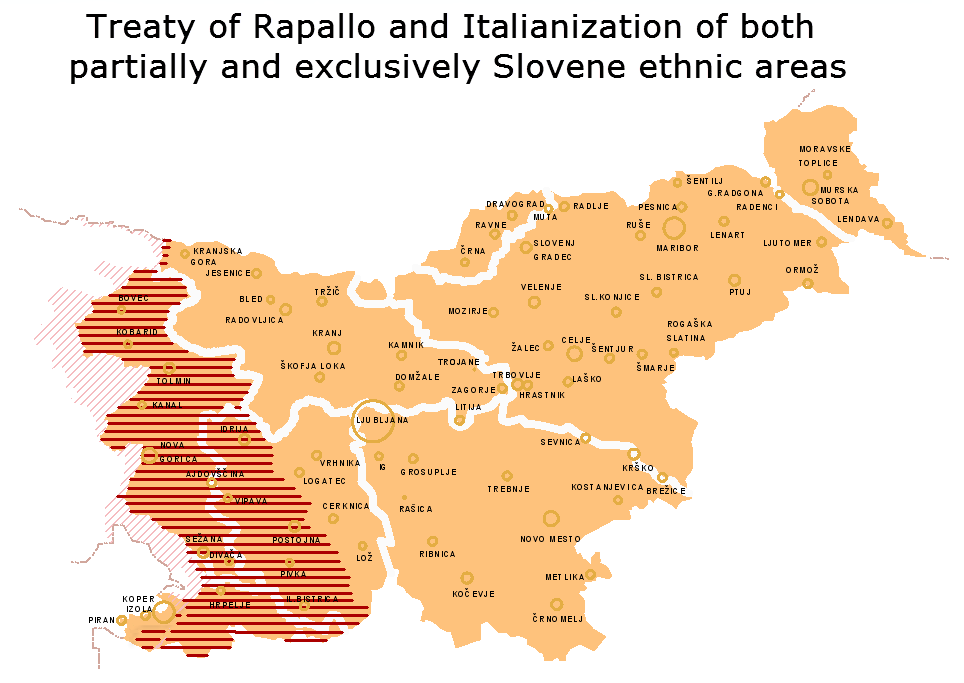
The Treaty of Rapallo and the Italianization of ethnic Slovene areas that included a quarter of Slovene ethnic territory and approximately 327,000 out of a total population of 1.3 million Slovenes, on the map of present-day Slovenia with its traditional regions' boundaries.

While the Austro-Hungarian Monarchy was a multi-national empire, which allowed a relatively large degree of cultural autonomy to the different peoples and ethnic groups, Italy was a nation state, and its governments had little intention of allowing the existence of separate national movements and identities on its territories. Issues regarding the use of the Slovene and Croatian languages in public administration and in the educational system, therefore, became the main point of contention between the Italian authorities and the Slovene and Croatian minorities.

After the Fascist movement came to power in 1922, anti-Slavic policies were enforced as part of Italianization. In 1923, the use of Slovene and Croatian in all public offices, including post offices and means of public transport, was prohibited. In the same year, the Gentile reform declared Italian as the only language of public education; by 1928, all Slovene and Croatian schools, including private ones, were closed down. In 1925, the use of Slovene and Croatian was prohibited in the courts of law. All Slovene and Croatian names of towns and settlements were Italianized. By 1927, all public use of Slovene and Croatian was prohibited. It was prohibited to give children Slavic names, and all Slavic-sounding surnames were administratively given an Italian-sounding form. The Fascist Italianization prohibited Slavic inscriptions on gravestones.

By 1927, all Slovene and Croatian associations—not only political ones, but also cultural, educational and sport associations—were dissolved, as were all financial and economic institutions in the hands of the Slovene and Croatian minority. Starting in 1928, the state law also started limiting the use of Slovene and Croatian in the churches, and in 1934, all use of Slovene and Croatian in Roman Catholic liturgy (including singing and sermons) was prohibited.

Under the effect of this policy, tens of thousands emigrated abroad, mostly to Yugoslavia and South America.

== Composition and activity ==
Its membership consisted of radical (mostly national liberal) Slovene youth from former Austrian Littoral, and a few Croats of Istria, where its support was much weaker. Many members of this organization were connected with Yugoslav and British intelligence services and many of them were militarily trained. The aim of the organization was to fight violent Fascist Italianization and to achieve the annexation of Istria, the Slovenian Littoral and Rijeka to Yugoslavia.

The TIGR carried out several bomb attacks on Italian and German soil, as well as assassinations of Italian military personnel, police forces, civil servants and prominent members of the National Fascist Party. It also planned a popular uprising against the Fascist regime, which was however never carried out. Because of these actions, it was treated as a terrorist organization by the Italian state.

The organization was dismantled by the Organization for Vigilance and Repression of Anti-Fascism in 1940 and 1941. Many of its members joined the Liberation Front of the Slovenian People during World War II. After the war, many former TIGR activists were persecuted by Yugoslav Communist authorities.

== Early activity ==
The first organized anti-Fascist resistance activities in the Julian March began in the mid 1920s in the easternmost districts of the region (around Postojna and Ilirska Bistrica), on the border with Yugoslavia. Local Slovene activists established contacts with the Yugoslav nationalist organization Orjuna, launching first attacks at Italian military and police personnel. These were however still mostly individual actions, without an organizational background. The connections between the Slovene anti-Fascist activists and the Orjuna were soon broken due to a different ideological agenda.

In September 1927, a group of Slovene liberal nationalist activists met on the Nanos Plateau above the Vipava Valley, and decided to form an insurgence organization called TIGR, an abbreviation of the names for Trieste, Istria, Gorizia, and Rijeka. A few months later, another meeting took place in Trieste, where a group connected to the former established the organization Borba (Fight), which also included some Croat activists from Istria. From the very beginning, the two groups worked in close alliance.

The two organization were formed mostly by Slovene progressive nationalist youngsters from Trieste, the Karst Plateau, Inner Carniola, and the Tolmin district. Between 1927 and 1930, the organization launched numerous attacks on individual members or supporters of the National Fascist Party (both Italian and Slovene), and also killed several members of repressive forces: carabinieri, border guards, military personnel.

In the Gorizia region, the TIGR organization restrained from openly violent actions, and focused mostly on propaganda and on illegal educational, cultural and political activity among larger strata of the population. The Gorizia section of the TIGR established close connections with the underground Catholic network organized by Christian Socialist activists, centered around the lawyer Janko Kralj and priest Virgil Šček.

In Istria, the TIGR cell was led by Vladimir Gortan, a Croat activist from Beram (near Pazin). Differently from most Slovene cells, Gortan opted for open demonstrative actions, such as attacks on police convoys. In March 1929, during the Fascist plebiscite, when he raided a polling station near the town of Pazin, killing one peasant. Soon afterwards, he was caught by the Italian police and executed.

On 10 February 1930, in the headquarters of the newspaper Il Popolo di Trieste, the TIGR places a bomb killing the editor Guido Neri. Three other journalists and typographers remained injured.

In 1930 the Italian fascist police discovered some TIGR cells. Numerous members of the organization were sentenced at the First Trieste trial; four of them (Ferdo Bidovec, Fran Marušič, Zvonimir Miloš and Alojzij Valenčič), charged with murder, were sentenced to death and executed at Basovizza (Slovene: Bazovica) near Trieste.

== Re-organization in the 1930s ==
After the trial of 1930, the organization quickly re-organized itself under the leadership of Albert Rejec and Danilo Zelen. It expanded its membership and shifted its tactics. Instead of demonstrative attacks on symbolic figures and institutions of Fascist repression, they opted for targeted attacks on infrastructure and high-ranking military, militia and police personnel. They also built a wide intelligence network, and established contacts with British and Yugoslav intelligence services. Ideological propaganda was intensified.

While in the late 1920s, the organization had close connection with radical Yugoslav nationalist movements, such as ORJUNA, after the reorganization in the 1930s it adopted a more left wing ideology. Several connections with Italian anti-Fascist organizations were established (including with the organisation Giustizia e Libertà). In 1935, TIGR signed an agreement of co-operation with the Communist Party of Italy. The TIGR nevertheless tried to remain above all ideological divisions, maintaining a close relationship with the local Slovene and Croat Roman Catholic lower clergy and grassroots organizations in Istria and the Slovenian Littoral.

Among the actions planned by the organization, the most daring and far-reaching was probably the attempt on Benito Mussolini's life in 1938. The plan was supposed to be carried out in 1938, when the dictator visited Kobarid (then officially known as Caporetto). The plan was put off at the last minute, most probably because of the pressure by the British intelligence, which opposed such an action in times when Mussolini was conducting an active role in the negotiations that led to the Munich Agreement.

After the Anschluss of Austria in 1938, the TIGR expanded its activity to neighboring Nazi Germany, focusing primarily on bomb actions against crucial infrastructure: railways, and high-voltage power lines. The actions led to a thorough investigation by the Fascist regime, which disclosed most of the TIGR cells in 1940/1941.

== Second World War ==
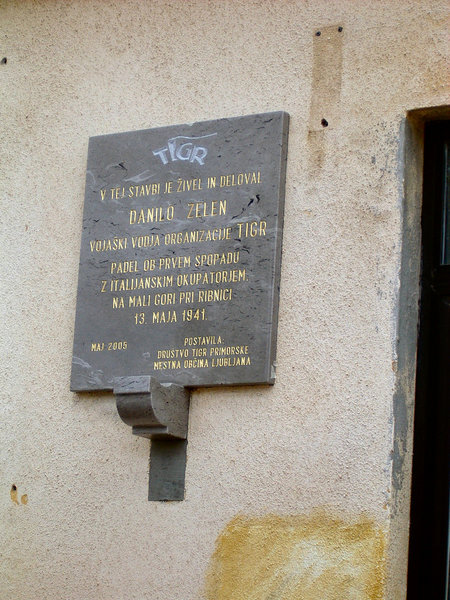
Memorial plaque in Ljubljana to Danilo Zelen, a leading member of the TIGR, fallen in the fight against Italian Army in the Province of Ljubljana in May 1941.

In 1941 several members of TIGR were condemned for espionage and terrorism at the Second Trieste trial; four of them (Viktor Bobek, Ivan Ivančič, Simon Kos and Ivan Vadnal) were executed in Villa Opicina near Trieste the same year, jointly with the Communist activist Pinko Tomažič. By the time of the Axis invasion of Yugoslavia in April 1941, most of the organization was already dismantled by both Italian and Nazi German secret police and most of its prominent members either sent to concentration camps, killed or exiled. On May 13, 1941, in the hills above Podtabor, three TIGR members carried out the first armed resistance against Axis forces in Slovenian territory during the Second World War, in which Danilo Zelen (1907–1941) was the first Slovenian to die in combat resisting the Axis forces.

During World War II, many of its members joined the partisan resistance, although the organization itself was not invited to join the Liberation Front of the Slovenian People.

== Aftermath and legacy ==
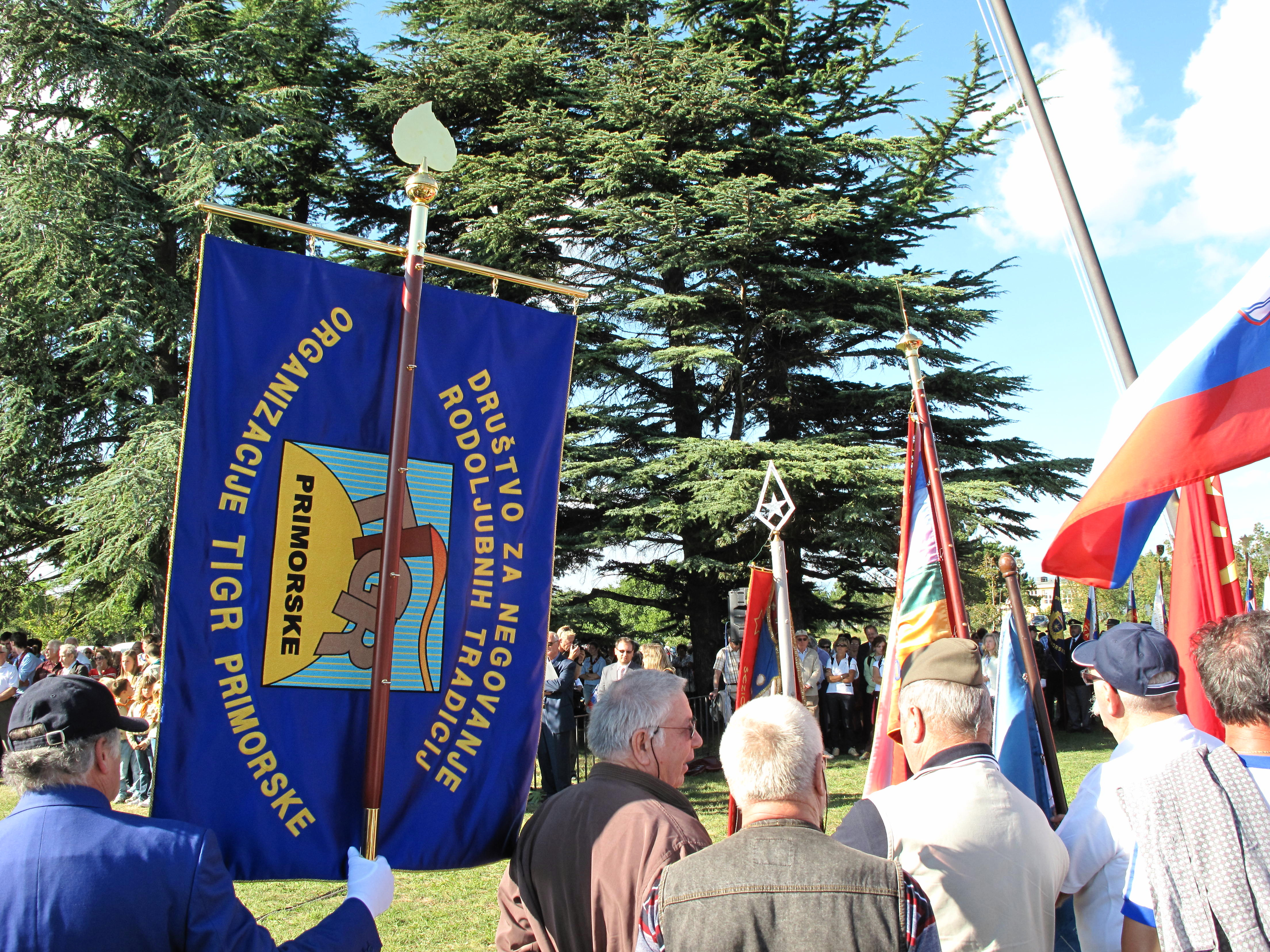
Members of the Patriotic Association TIGR at the commemoration of the 80th anniversary of the Victims of Basovizza in Basovizza near Trieste, Italy

After the establishment of the Communist regime in Yugoslavia in 1945, most former TIGR members were removed from public life. The Yugoslav secret police continued to closely monitor some of TIGR's members up to the 1970s. Their activity was removed from the official historical accounts.

In the late 1970s, the first historical accounts on the activity of the TIGR started to appear. Only in the 1980s, however, did their resistance activity started to be appreciated again, with several historical books written on the matter. The historian Milica Kacin Wohinz was one of the first to produce a thorough study of the movement in a monograph entitled "The First Anti-Fascism in Europe", and published in 1990.

Throughout the 1990s, the history of TIGR received increased publicity and started to be mentioned in public speeches. In 1994, the Association for the Nourishment of Patriotic Traditions of the Slovenian Littoral Organization TIGR (colloquially known as the "Association TIGR" or "Patriotic Association TIGR") was formed in Postojna, and eventually became the main promoter of the positive evaluation of the TIGR legacy.

In 1997 on the 50th anniversary of annexation of the Slovenian Littoral to the Socialist Republic of Slovenia, the then president of Slovenia Milan Kučan symbolically insignated the organization TIGR with the Golden Honour Insignia of Freedom of the Republic of Slovenia (Zlati častni znak svobode Republike Slovenije), the highest state decoration in Slovenia.

Since the 1990s, many monuments and memorial plaques have been erected to commemorate TIGR activists and their activities.

== Prominent TIGR members ==
- Albert Rejec
- Zorko Jelinčič
- Danilo Zelen
- Ferdo Kravanja
- Fran Marušič
- Dorče Sardoč
- Zvonimir Miloš
- Just Godnič
- Tone Černač
- Ferdo Bidovec
- Alojz Valenčič
- Ivan Ivančič
- Andrej Manfreda
- Vekoslav Španger
- Drago Žerjal
- Vladimir Gortan
- Jože Dekleva
- Jože Vadnjal
- Mirko Brovč
- Franc Kavs
- Anton Majnik
- Maksimilijan Rejec
- Rudolf Uršič
- Viktor Bobek

=== People linked to the organization ===
- Ciril Kosmač, writer
- Vladimir Bartol, writer
- Stanko Vuk, author and activist
- Pinko Tomažič, Communist activist
- Ivan Marija Čok, Slovenian immigrant politician in Yugoslavia

== See also ==
- Slovene minority in Italy (1920–1947)
- Lojze Bratuž
- Engelbert Besednjak
- Josip Vilfan
- Lavo Čermelj
- Klement Jug
- Slovene Partisans
- Liberation Front of the Slovene Nation
