= Zorko Jelinčič =

Slovenian national activist and cultural worker

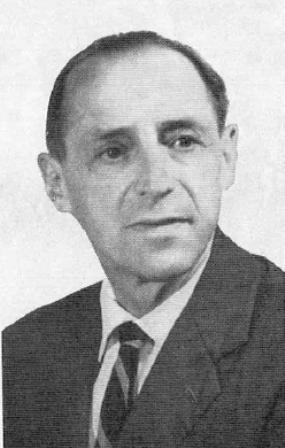
- Born: 5 March 1900; Log pod Mangartom
- Died: 13 July 1965 (aged 65); Trieste
- Known for: national and cultural worker
- Spouse(s): Fanica Jelinčič, born Obida and Danica Jelinčič, born Žun
- Parent(s): Ferdinand Jelinčič; Josipina Jelinčič, born Trebše
- Relatives: Slavko Jelinčič (brother)

Zorko Jelinčič (5 March 1900 - 13 July 1965) was a Slovenian national activist and cultural worker.

== Life and work ==
He was born into a teacher's family in Log pod Mangartom, Slovenia. He attended and finished primary school in his hometown, despite the fact that his father was transferred to other places on business. He graduated in 1918 from the Idrija high school. He then enrolled at the Faculty of Filosophy in Ljubljana. In the school year 1923/1924, he and his friend Klement Jug transferred to the University of Padua, but Jelinčič did not finish his studies. In 1924 he joined the Association of Educational Societies in Gorica and soon became its secretary. At the same time he became the secretary of the student society Adrija in Gorica, which was founded on August 9, 1902, as an academic holiday society. As the secretary of the Association of Educational Societies, he traveled extensively in the Goriška region and organized liberal cultural clubs. He was among the founders and leaders of the illegal revolutionary organization TIGR. In 1929 he married Fanica Obida. The following year he was arrested when the illegal organization TIGR - Trst, Istra, Gorica, Rijeka was uncovered by fascist authorities; In 1931, he was as the top defendant among 30 accused, sentenced to 20 years in prison by a special court in Rome, the continuation of the 1st TIGR trial in Trieste. He was released after 9 years. After coming home, his wife died in the birth of his second daughter. Shortly after the outbreak of World War II, he was confined to the province of Isernio until the capitulation of Italy. After the dissolution of Italy in the autumn of 1943 he joined the partisans; there he was a member of the Provincial National Liberation Committee for Slovenian Littoral. After the liberation, he settled in Trieste, where he worked mainly in the cultural section of the Provincial National Liberation Committee and later in the Educational Association. In 1948 he married for the second time Danica Žun. From 1958 on he worked in Institute for Ethnic Issues in Ljubljana and was one of the initiators for the creation of an ethnographic map of the Trieste territory based on original, ancient fallow names. He has been involved in journalism since 1924, publishing articles in various newspapers. He commemorative book on Klement Jug, he wrote two treatises: Dr. Klement Jug (1898-1924) and Jug and mountains.
