= Stojan Batič =

Slovenian artist (1925–2015)

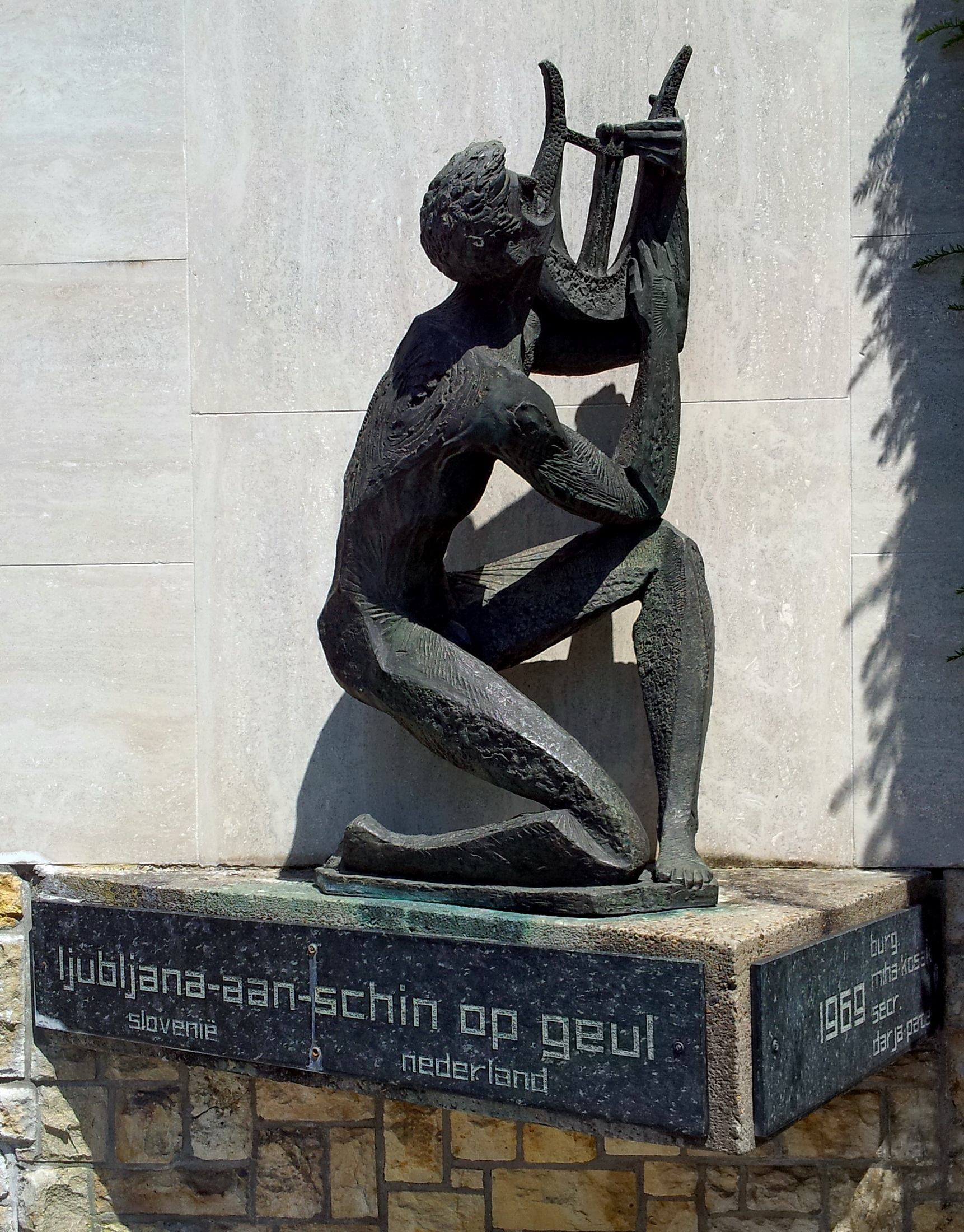
- Born: 2 June 1925; Trbovlje, Slovenia
- Died: 17 September 2015 (aged 90); Ljubljana, Slovenia
- Known for: Sculpture
- Awards: Prešeren Award

Stojan Batič (2 June 1925 – 17 September 2015) was a Slovene sculptor. Mostly a figurative artist, he is particularly known for his sculptures exhibited in many public places in Slovenia.

== Life ==
Batič was born in a working-class family in Trbovlje, a mining town in central Slovenia, then part of the Kingdom of Serbs, Croats and Slovenes. As a teenager, he worked in the local coal mine. At the age of 19, he joined the partisan resistance and fought the invading Nazi German forces. After World War II, he was the first to enroll at the newly established Academy of Fine Arts at the University of Ljubljana, where he studied sculpture under Boris Kalin and Frančišek Smerdu. In 1957, he received a scholarship, which enabled him to study in Paris with the sculptor Ossip Zadkine.

Batič lived and worked in Ljubljana. In 1995, he had a show at Ljubljana City Gallery. In 2015, the Jakopič Gallery held a retrospective exhibition of his work under the title "The Man and The Myth" (Človek in mit).

== Work ==
Batič, predominantly a figurative sculptor, is known for about 40 public monuments depicting events from Slovene history, as well as European and Oriental myths and legends. His best-known works include the monument to the Slovene peasant revolts at Ljubljana Castle featuring a group of men holding war scythes, and the Itaka series of figurative sculptures. His 1957 bronze sculpture Balet (Ballet) stands in front of Tivoli Castle in Tivoli Park in Ljubljana. In the 1960s, he created a mining-related series in lignite, and in the 1970s a series of glass sculptures, the two representing his most significant approach to abstract art.

== Awards ==
In 1960, Batič received the Prešeren Award, the highest prize for artistic and cultural achievements in Slovenia.

== See also ==
- List of Slovenian sculptors
- "Stojan Batic", Artnet

== Bibliography ==
- Stojan Batič. Izbor reproduciranih del in oblikovanje monografije: Zoran Kržišnik, Jože Brumen, Stojan Batič. Prevod v angleščino: Bojan P. Moll. Reprodukcije: Miro Zdovc.
