= Igor Škamperle =

Slovenian sociologist and mountaineer

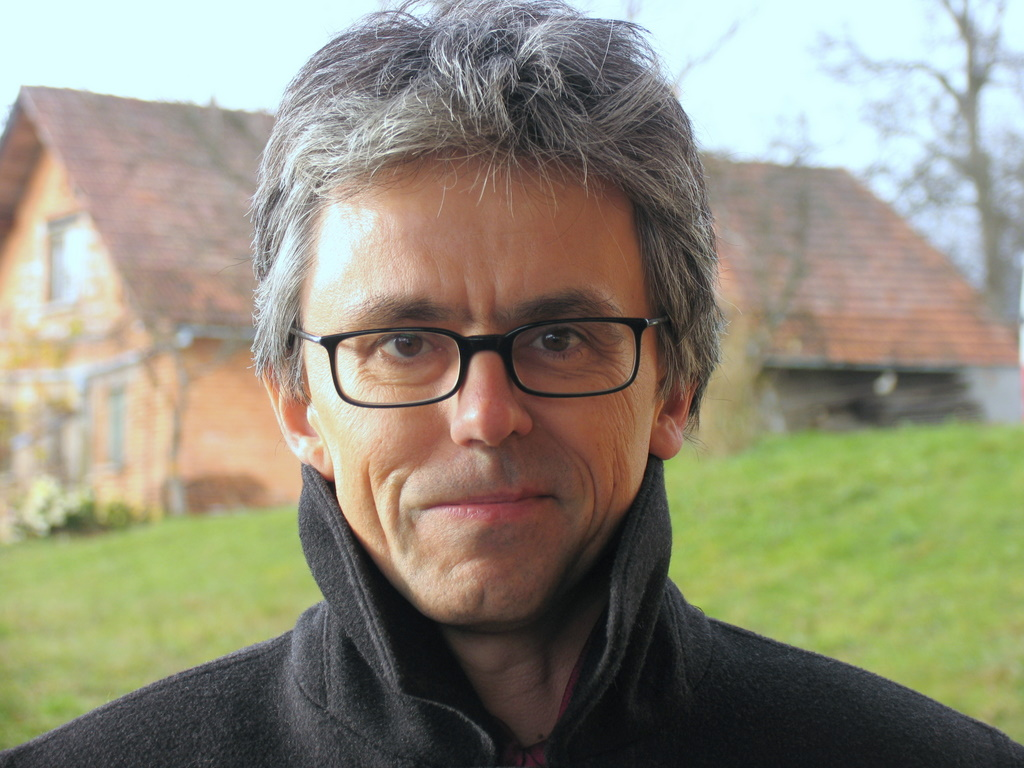
Igor Škamperle

Igor Škamperle (born 21 November 1962) is a Slovenian sociologist, cultural theorist, novelist, essayist, mountaineer and translator.

He was born in a Slovene-speaking family in Trieste, Italy. He studied comparative literature and cultural sociology at the University of Ljubljana, where he graduated in 1990. He continued his studies at the Universities of Bologna and Perugia, where he studied cultural and social changes in the Renaissance period and the cosmologic thought of Giordano Bruno. Since 1999, he works as a professor of sociology at the Faculty of Arts of the University of Ljubljana.

His field of interest is mostly the Renaissance culture and the theory of symbolic forms. In his writings and translations, Škamperle introduced the thought of the Italian historical school (with Eugenio Garin and Federico Chabod as its main representatives) into the Slovene historiography. He wrote treatises about Renaissance thinkers such as Pico della Mirandola and Nicholas of Cusa. He was one of the first scholars of hermetism in Slovenia, as well as one of the first Slovene interpreters of Carl Gustav Jung. Škamperle's most important work is Magična renesansa ("The Magical Renaissance"), in which he analyzed the magical-mythological current in the European Renaissance and reflected on the reasons of its disappearance with the emergence of Classicism. He studied and wrote about the political thought of Machiavelli, the historical epistemology of Alexandre Koyré and various religious manifestations such as shamanism. He also published important studies on Eleazar M. Meletinskii and Georges Dumézil.

In his young years, Škamperle was a mountaineer. He wrote several books on mountaineering which has an important influence in the Slovene mountaineer subculture. His writing insert themselves in a long tradition of Slovene mountaineering essayistics, that goes from Julius Kugy to Tone Svetina and Dušan Jelinčič.

He also collaborated in productions for the Slovenian Television Broadcast. The two most important were the film Epifanija zemlje in duha ("Epiphany of Earth and Spirit"), dedicated to the 80 years of the author Alojz Rebula, and a documentary on the Slovene philosopher Klement Jug.

He regularly publishes essays reflecting on contemporary society in the journals Sodobnost and Nova revija.

== Major works ==
- Sneg na zlati veji ("The Snow on the Golden Branch", novel, 1992)
- Hermetizem ("Hermetism", monograph, 1996)
- Kraljeva hči ("The King's Daughter", novel, 1997)
- Magična renesansa ("The Magical Renaissance, 1999)
- Šamanizem ("Shamanism", monograph, 2007)

== Sources ==
- Department of Sociology: Igor Škamperle (in Slovene)
