= Andrej Grabrovec =

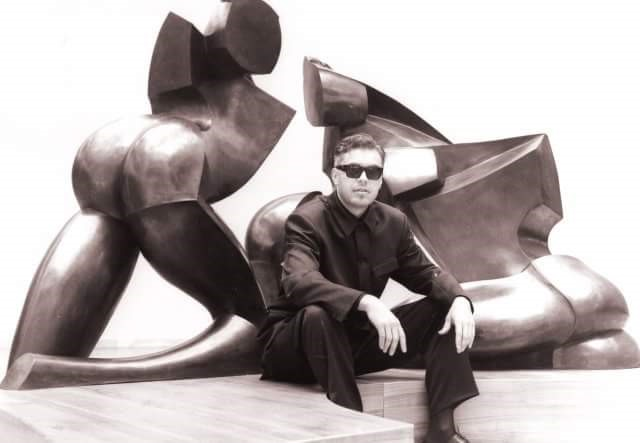

Andrej Grabrovec (pseudonym Gaberi), is a Slovenian artist, engineer, sculptor and photographer, who was born in 1959.

== Biography ==
He was born in 1959 in Maribor, where he attended high school and graduated from the Higher Technical School of Civil Engineering in 1985. In cooperation with the Design and Research Office at the Higher Technical school in Maribor and under the guidance of Professor Borut Pečenko and engineer Vukašin Ačanski, he developed concepts, drawings and models of "forma vivo" in concrete. In 1986, he started a long-term cooperation with the Art Foundry and the Academy of Fine Arts in Zagreb. In 1990, he decided to pursue an independent career. In his studio he started working on a large sculpture made of clay and plaster. In 1993, he founded the Central European Civic Initiative Harpistic Table. In 2000, he placed a public sculpture in front of Charles University in Prague, founding the new project of cooperation of the old European Universities, known as European University Bridges. Since 2001 he has been publishing a magazine for new relations in the third millennium entitled ga BERI. In 2005, he installed the sculptural composition The Bridge outside the new Jagiellonian University, outlining a new project of collaboration among old European universities, named European University Bridges. He lives and works in Ljubljana, Maribor and Zagreb.

== Work ==
He draws designs and makes models of sculptural compositions, writes insights and seeks solutions for public installations. In his work he combines art, geometry, technology and a comprehensive dimension. In his studios in Maribor and Zagreb, he makes large compositions in clay, plaster and wood and has them cast in bronze at Art Foundry in Zagreb. The basic, recurring motif of his work is the Woman in the public European space, because it was a woman who made a significant contribution to the formation of European culture, the woman who is inspired by music as a universal love. In the Maribor Gallery he organises round tables, ceremonial meetings of the Harpistic Table, exhibitions and concerts. [1]

== Projects ==
- 1993: civic initiative Harpistic Table
- 2000: artistic project European University Bridges
- 2001: ga BERI magazine
- 2018: Sculptures Gaberi movie

== Public tenders ==
- 1989: Maribor (Slovenia) for a monument of the bishop Anton Martin Slomšek
- 1990: Zagreb (Croatia) for a monument of Miroslav Krleža
- 2004: Poreč (Croatia) for a fountain in Poreč
- 2017: Graz (Austria) for a public installation of the sculpture

== Public monuments ==
- 1992: The Sleeping Muse 1 in Graz, Austria
- 1993: creation of a large plastic Fall of the Crucified for the municipality of Razkrižje
- 1993: The Sleeping Muse 2 in Ljubljana, Slovenia (on the premises of the Slovenian Government)
- 1994: Monument of Lord Kocel in Maribor
- 1995: Bust of Miroslav Krleža in Zagreb, Croatia
- 1996: sculpture composition The Drava Fairies in Maribor
- 1997: fountain Dance of the fairies in Maribor
- 2000: The Prague Muse in front of the Charles University in Prague (Czech Republic)

2001: The Rector's Chair at the University of Technology in Vienna (Austria)

2002: The Portrait of Europe Relief in Europa-Park near Vienna (Austria)

2004: Themis and Dike in the hall of the Faculty of Law in Maribor (Slovenia)

2005: The Bridge in front of the new Jagiellonian University in Kraków (Poland)

2006: Mother Earth water sculpture in the BTC in Ljubljana (Slovenia)

2007: Omega sculptural composition in the botanical garden of Vilnius University (Lithuania)

2007: Little Mermaid sculpture in Novigrad, Croatia

2007: The Crucified for Croatia, Zadar (Croatia)

2008: the relief A Midsummer Night's Dream in Ljubljana (Slovenia)

2008: makes a large Paradise Gate in his studio

2008: makes a large Pieta relief in his studio

2009: The relief Angels Sing Beautifully at UKC, Ljubljana (Slovenia)

2012: installation of The Chapel of Universal Love in Maribor for the closing of the ECC (Slovenia)

2013: sculptural composition Historica in front of the Corvinus University in Budapest (Hungary)

2014: sculptura composition Little Mermaid in Novigrad (Croatia)

2015: sculptural composition Siddharta at the BTC in Ljubljana (Slovenia)

2017: sculptural composition Rhine Nymphs at the BTC in Ljubljana (Slovenia)

2018: sculptural composition European University Bridges at Alma Mater Europaea in Maribor (Slovenia)

2021: installation of the public bronze sculpture "Chained nymph Ballerina" in the roundabout BTC Ljubljana (Slovenia)

2021: installation of the all-Slovenian memorial "Pillar of statehood with the Slovenian muse of songs" in Lenart at 30th anniversary of independence (Slovenia)

2021: permanent installation of the sculptural collection "Women's Image in the Public European Space" at area of 450m2 in Maribor (Slovenia)

== Exhibitions - Solo exhibitions ==
1989: Maribor (Slovenia), University Library Maribor

1990: Varaždin (Croatia), exhibition space Vama

1992: Graz (Austria), Otto Hase Gallery

1993: Ljubljana (Slovenia), Government of the Republic of Slovenia

1993: Ljubljana (Slovenia), Nova Ljubljanska Bank

1996: Zagreb (Croatia), Mimara Museum in Zagreb

2001: Vienna (Austria), Korotan Vienna Gallery

2017: Zagreb (Croatia), Mimara Museum

2019: Rogaška Slatina (Slovenia), Gallery Nina

== Exhibitions - Group exhibitions ==
- 2017: Paris (France), Grand Palais - MENTION award
- 2019: Paris (France), Grand Palais - Arthur Leduc’s award, given by the French Association of Fine Artists
- 2020: Paris (France), Grand Palais

== Reviews ==
- 1992: Wilhelm Steinbuk, director of Museum Graz
- 1993: Aleksander Bassin, director of the City gallery in Ljubljana
- 1994: Sergej Vrišer, art historian
- 1997: Maja Vetrih, art historian
- 1999: Damjan Prelovšek, art historian
- 2003: Oswald Miedl, Academy of Fine Arts, University of Passau

2003: Richard Vakaj, Academy of Fine Arts, University of Vienna

2006: Maja Vetrih, art historian

2007: Maja Vetrih, art historian

2008: Marjan Žnidarič, director of the National Museum of Contemporary History of Slovenia

2008: Mario Berdič, art historian

2011: Attila Zsigmond, director of the Budapest Galeria

2017: Damjan Prelovšek, art historian

2019: Polona Tratnik, Professor

2019: Iz roda v rod, Radio Maribor

2021: presentation in the Monograph of the Maribor Society of Artists on the occasion of the 100th anniversary of the art organization DLUM
