= Annapurna South =

Mountain in Nepal

- Annapurna Dakshin, Moditse
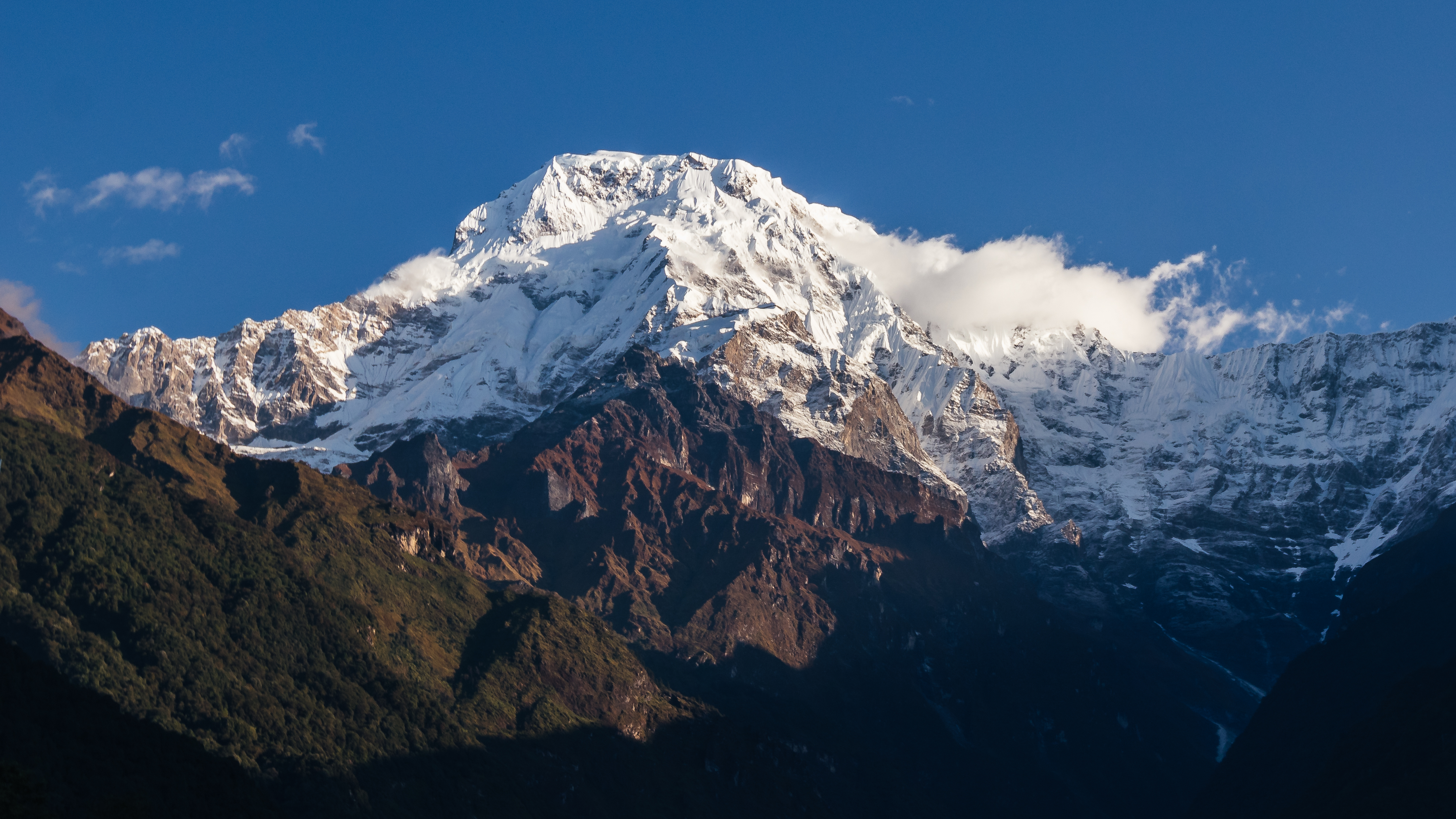
- Annapurna South

Highest point
- Elevation: 7,219 m (23,684 ft); Ranked 100th
- Prominence: 775 m (2,543 ft)
- Parent peak: Annapurna I Main
- Isolation: 6.76 km (4.20 mi)
- Coordinates: 28°31′06″N 83°48′22″E

Naming
- Native name: Moditse (Nepali)

Geography
- Location within Nepal
- Location: Annapurna Himal, Gandaki Province, Nepal
- Parent range: Annapurna Massif

Climbing
- First ascent: 15 October 1964
- Easiest route: difficult snow/ice climb

Annapurna South (Nepali: अन्नपूर्ण दक्षिण) is a mountain in the Annapurna Himal range of the Himalayas located in Nepal, and the 100th-highest mountain in the world. It is the 5th highest peak of the Annapurna mountain range. It was first ascended in 1964, and is 7,219 metres (23,684 ft) tall. The nearby mountain Hiunchuli is in fact an extension of Annapurna South.

== First Ascent ==
The first ascent was achieved in 1964 by a six-person team from the Kyoto University Alpine Club. The team had originally planned an ascent of Dhaulagiri IV but upon permit application to the Government of Nepal they were informed that permission had already been given to a British team. The expedition left the Pokhara airfield with a support team of four Sherpas, 54 porters and a liaison officer on September 9. They reached the valley containing the ablation zone of the South Annapurna Glacier on September 15 where they established base camp. On September 21 Camp I was set up at 4,100 m (13,450 ft) upon the moraine of the Ganesh Glacier after a four-day reconnaissance. Camp II was established at 5,200 m (17,060 ft) on the 27th. It took several days to find a suitable route through avalanche terrain to set up Camp III at 5,600 m (18,370 ft). Steep ice and snow required the fixing of ropes before Camp IV was set up at 6,200 m (20,340 ft) on October 6 under an overhanging ice-wall. On October 12, Camp V was established at 6,600 m (21,650 ft) at a small snow terrace just below the main summit ridge. The next day the first assault team of three members reached the summit of the central peak in mid afternoon. However, the team now could see that the peaks to the north and south were slightly higher than the central peak which was thought to be the highest when viewed from base camp. With an estimated five hours to reach either peak though, it was too late to make the attempt so the team made the six-hour descent to Camp V. On October 15, two teams of two people made for the north and south peaks. The south peak team continued over the central peak and reached the south summit at noon time which they concluded to be the highest point. The second team headed to the north summit managed to reached a minor peak on the way but poor route conditions and lack of time prevented them from reaching the northernmost peak. Both parties returned to Camp V by 4 pm.

== Gallery ==
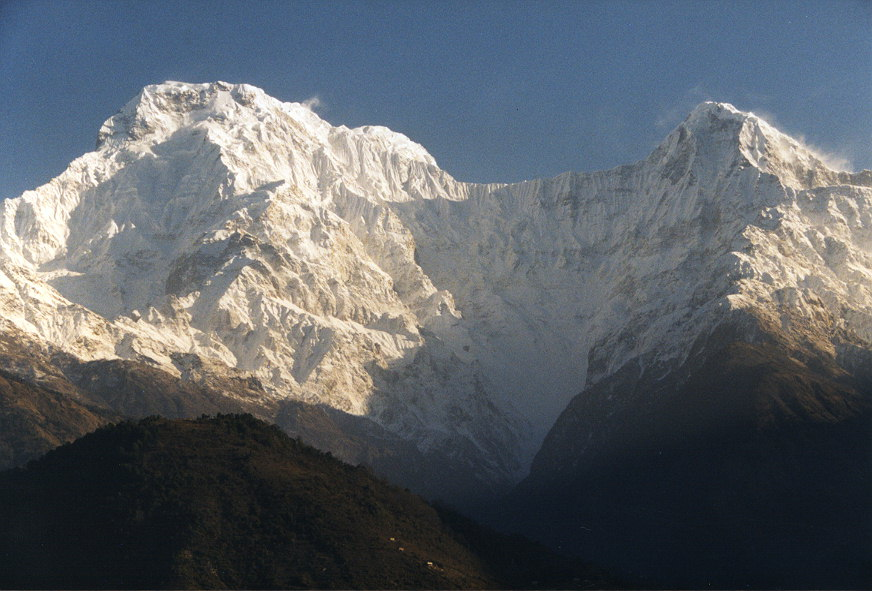
A view of Annapurna South and Hiunchuli

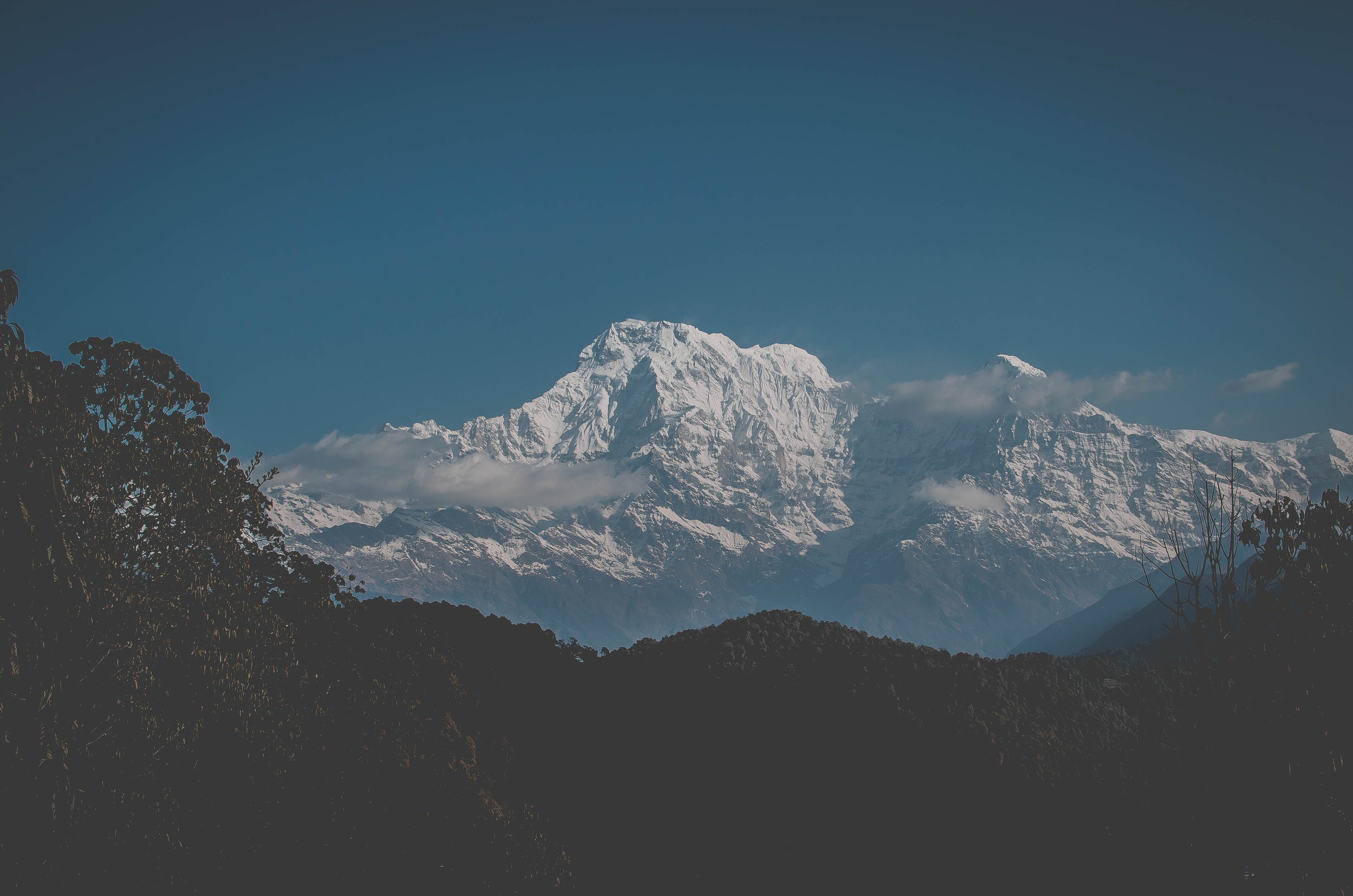
A view of Annapurna South and Hiunchuli (Australian base camp)

== See also ==
- Annapurna I Main
- Annapurna I East
- Annapurna I Central
- Hiunchuli
- Annapurna II
- Annapurna III
- Annapurna IV
