= Klement Jug =

Slovene philosopher, essayist and mountaineer

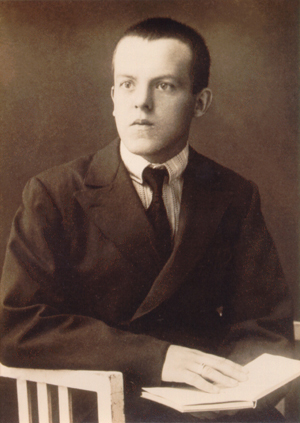
Jug in 1920

Klement Jug (19 November 1898 – 11 August 1924) was a Slovene philosopher, essayist and mountaineer who died while climbing Mount Triglav. Although he did not publish many works during his lifetime, he became one of the most influential thinkers of the younger generations of Slovenian intellectuals in the interwar period.

== Life ==
Jug was born in a wealthy peasant-merchant family in Solkan, Slovenia, then a suburb of the Austro-Hungarian town of Gorizia. He attended the grammar school in Gorizia and then enrolled at the University of Ljubljana where he studied philosophy under the supervision of the Slovene phenomenologist philosopher France Veber. A fervent reader of Kant, Jug developed his own philosophy based on the supremacy of the will and the unappealable adherence to ethics and personal responsibility.

Since young age, Jug also practiced extreme alpinism, in which he saw a way to practice the effort self-control. In one of his solitary excursions to the Julian Alps, he died by falling from the northern face of Mount Triglav.

== Legacy ==
Jug left very few written works. During his lifetime, he published only a few essays, while several philosophic and ethical reflections have been found as manuscripts after his death and published posthumously by his closest friends. Nevertheless, his influence has been relatively big. He was considered to be the ideological leader of the younger generations of Slovene students from the Julian March, the western Slovenian region which came under Italian administration after World War I. These youngsters rejected any compromises with Italian Fascists and urged for a radical and organized resistance against the policies of Fascist Italianization. Many of them found in Jug the source for their intellectual and personal inspiration.

Among Jug's direct disciples were the famous novelist Vladimir Bartol and Zorko Jelinčič, one of the co-founders of the militant anti-fascist organization TIGR. Already in 1925, the two organized the first seminar dedicated to Jug's memory in the village of Krn near Kobarid, in which they discussed the issues of Jug's voluntaristic world view. Due to the effort of Jug's colleagues, his posthumous fame spread in the intellectual circles of interwar Slovenia. The list of his admirers included the author, politician and diplomat Anton Novačan, the poet Oton Župančič, the playwrights Pavel Golia and Ivan Mrak, and the poet and political activist Edvard Kocbek.

Many prominent Slovene thinkers and artists have published their reflections over Jug's fate, including the literary critic Josip Vidmar, the novelist Vladimir Bartol, philosopher Milan Komar, essayist Jože Javoršek, and philosopher and literary critic Taras Kermauner. Jug has also influenced the strong Slovenian mountaineer subculture and the literature which emerged from it; authors who have been influenced by Klement Jug include Igor Škamperle and Dušan Jelinčič. The controversial Slovenian psychologist and therapist Janez Rugelj also wrote on Jug, taking him as a positive example of a self-made man. The sociologist Lev Milčinski, on the other hand, analyzed Jug as an example of a self-destructive and suicidal personality.

In 1988, the writer and playwright Drago Jančar portrayed Jug in the play "Klement's Fall" (Klementov padec). In 2006, a documentary on Klement Jug was filmed and broadcast on Slovenian National Television. A popular Alpine lodge in the upper Soča Valley is named after him.

== Sources ==
- Marko Klavora, Ljubezen in hrepenenje po večnosti: osebnost Klementa Juga ("Love and the Yearning for Eternity: the Personality of Klement Jug"; Ljubljana, 2006);
- Branko Marušič, Dr. Klement Jug : 1898-1924 (Ljubljana & Nova Gorica, 1998);
- Polona Puc, Klement Jug v slovenski literaturi ("Klement Jug in the Slovenian literature"; Ljubljana, 2007);
