= Vlasta Zorko =

Slovenian sculptor (born 1934)

- Born: May 27, 1934 (age 92)
- Education: Academy of Fine Arts and Design, Ljubljana

Vlasta Zorko (born May 27, 1934 in Maribor) is a Slovenian sculptor. She studied sculpture at the Academy of Fine Arts and Design, Ljubljana alongside fellow sculptor Zdenko Kalin, graduating in 1959. After graduating she studied abroad and has been a freelance artist since 1972. She was married to sculptor Slavko Tihec from 1958 to 1983.

Her sculptures are typically of people, made out of stone, concrete, metal and other materials.

She has exhibited at the Museum of Modern and Contemporary Art Koroška (KGLU).

In 2018 a retrospective of her work was held at the Umetnostna galerija Maribor (Maribor Art Gallery).
