= Janez Zorko =

Slovenian sculptor and mountain climber (1937–2023)

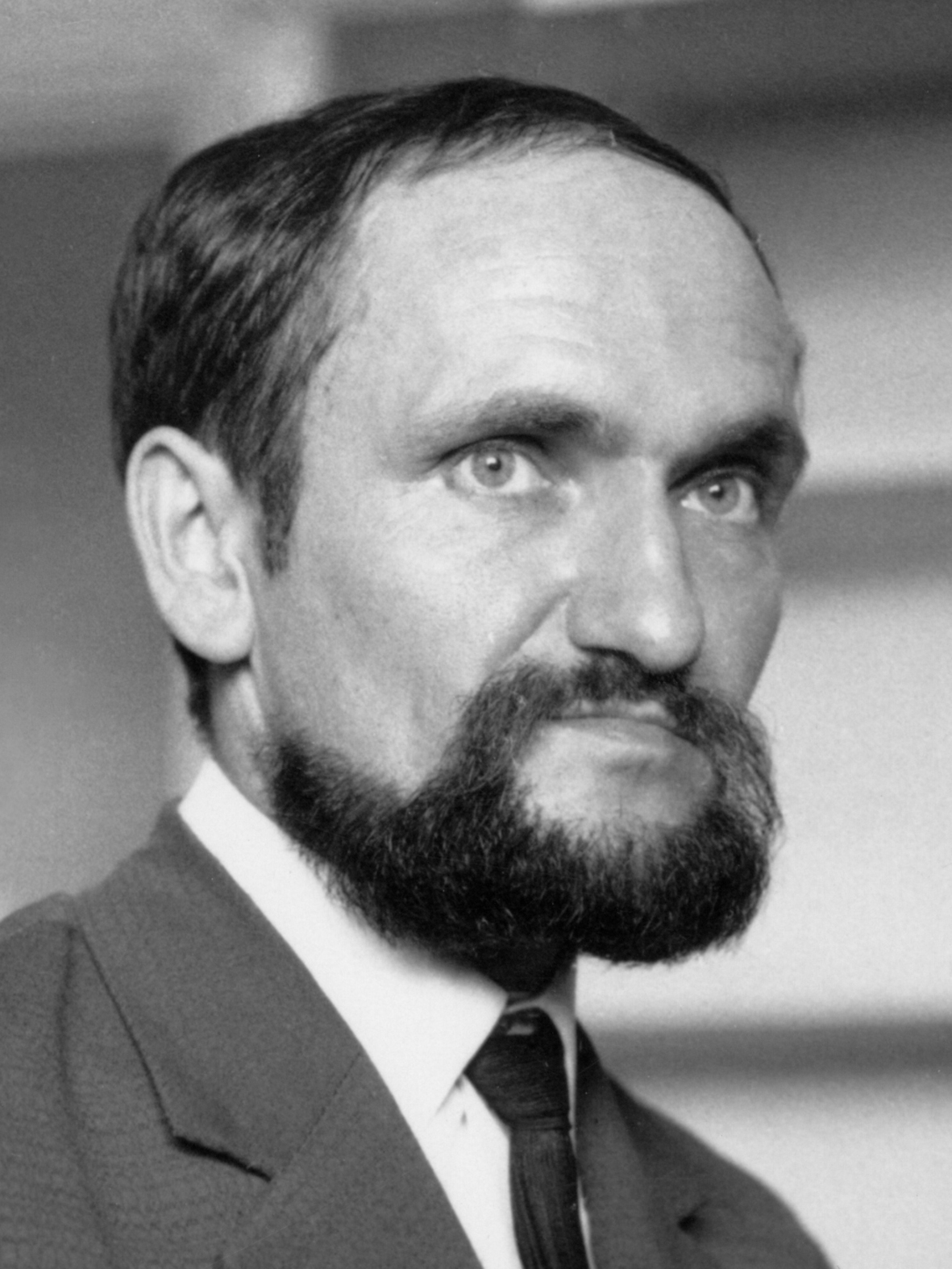
- Zorko in 1968
- Born: December 16, 1937
- Died: October 7, 2023 (aged 85)
- Occupations: Sculptor, mountain climber
- Years active: 1960s–2023

Janez Zorko (16 December 1937 – 7 October 2023) was a Slovenian sculptor and mountain climber.

== Early life ==
Zorko attended art school from 1957 to 1959 in Ljubljana. He moved to Paris, France in 1964.

== Career ==
Zorko taught Materials and Technology courses at the University of Paris 1 Pantheon-Sorbonne from 1974 to 1976. He created both figurative and abstract sculptures in marble, metal and wood. He was also a keen mountain climber, performing numerous ascents both solo and with others.

== Death ==
Zorko died on 7 October 2023, at the age of 85.
