= Ljubljana School of Graphic Arts =

Visual arts movement in Slovenia

Ljubljana School of Graphic Arts was an art movement of graphic artists in Slovenia during the mid 20th century. It developed in conjunction with the establishment of the Ljubljana Biennial of Graphic Arts in 1955 and was supported by the Academy of Fine Arts in Ljubljana. The movement's most active period spanned from 1955 to 1970. At its time, Ljubljana (the capital of Slovenia) gained recognition as one of the leading centres of graphic art internationally. Today, the school is considered one of Slovenia's most successful art currents. The Ljubljana School of Graphic Arts has produced at least 10,000 graphic works and comprises one of the world's largest cultural and artistic graphic heritage collections.

The origins of the Ljubljana Graphic School are linked to the first international graphic arts exhibition in Ljubljana in 1955, which later became the biennial. The artists associated with the movement were known for their pursuit of technical excellence, particularly in traditional intaglio techniques such as etching and aquatint. Their approach emphasized the autonomy of printmaking as an independent artistic medium. The movement emerged from the partisan graphic art and meant a break with social realism, adhering closely to the principles of Western European modernism. Notable artists of the school were Riko Debenjak, Božidar Jakac, Miha Maleš, France Mihelič, Maksim Sedej, Janez Bernik, Bogdan Borčić, Andrej Jemec, Adriana Maraž, and Tinca Stegovec.
