= The Lacemaker (disambiguation) =

The Lacemaker may refer to:

- The Lacemaker, a 1977 French drama film.
- The Lacemaker (Maes), a circa 1650 painting by Nicolaes Maes.
- The Lacemaker (Vermeer), a circa 1670 painting by Johannes Vermeer.
- The Lacemaker (after Vermeer), a 1955 copy of Vermeer's work made by Salvador Dalí.
- Lacemaker (Portrait of Štefka Batič), a 1923 work by Slovenian painter Veno Pilon
