= International Centre of Graphic Arts (Ljubljana) =

Museum in Ljubljana, Slovenia

Coordinates: 46°3′16.94″N 14°29′34.84″E

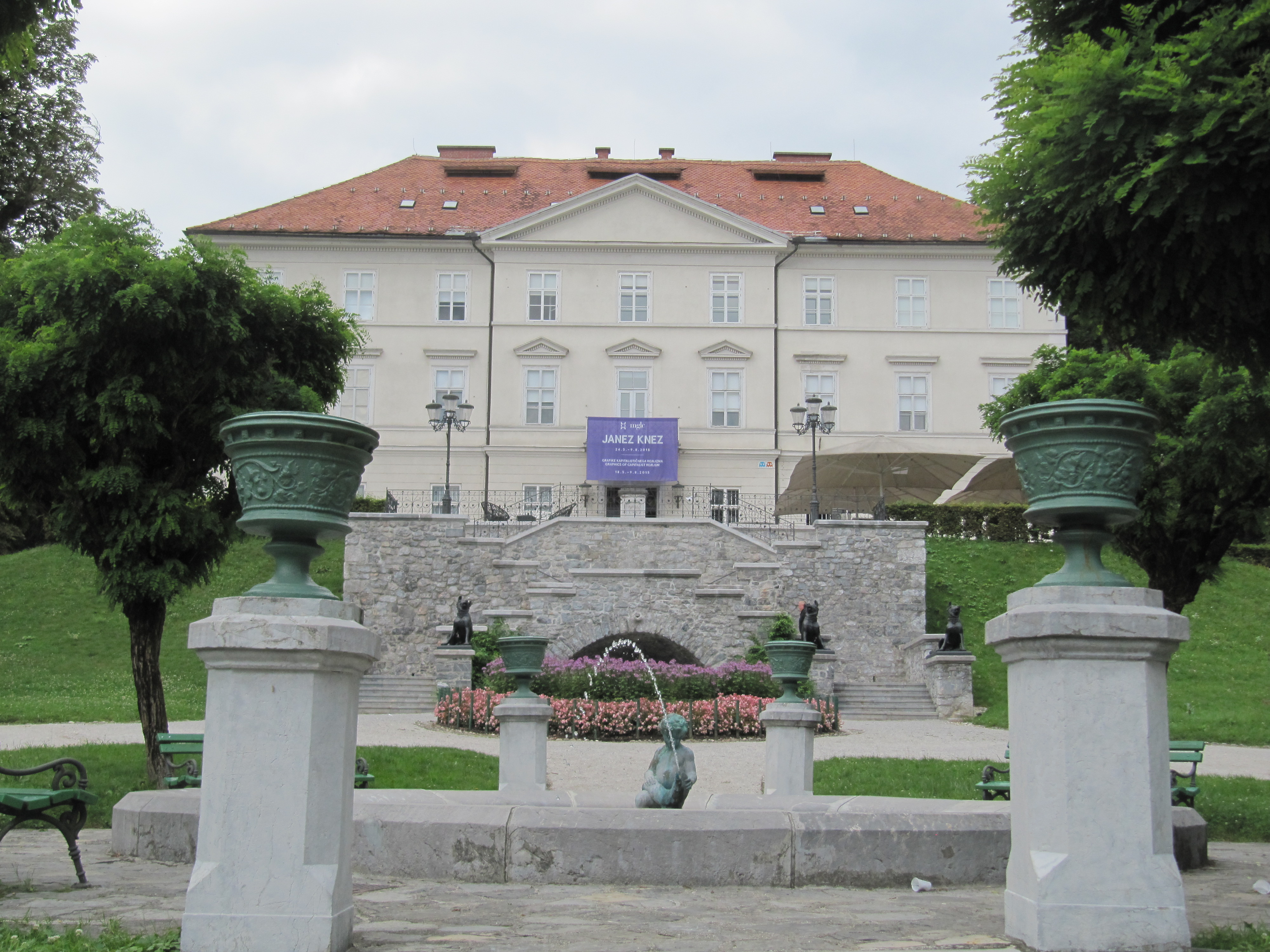
The Center in 2015

The International Centre of Graphic Arts (Slovene: Mednarodni grafični likovni center) in Ljubljana was established in 1986 to give the international Ljubljana Biennial of Graphic Arts - which itself has a longer, uninterrupted tradition from 1955 - its own place. Most of its history the director was Zoran Kržišnik.

The museum has a rich collection of prints by international modernist artists, which consists of more than four thousand items. Along with such international artists as Pablo Picasso, Robert Rauschenberg, Nancy Spero, Mangelos, Ivan Picelj, Dóra Maurer, Malle Leis, Osip Zadkin, Görgy Galántai and others, the collection includes complete or partial oeuvres of Lojze Spacal, Vladimir Makuc, Danilo Jejčič, Janez Bernik, Tinca Stegovec, the Slovenia's finest printmakers.

Besides its main collection, the museum has a Collection of Prints and Original Printed Ephemera established in 2000, consisting of posters, fanzines and other items, including all artistic newspaper projects of the Vienna museum "in progress" published in Der Standard daily from 1990 to 2002 and all issues of the hybrid Point d'Ironie newspaper.

== See also ==
- Academy of Fine Arts in Ljubljana
- List of art galleries in Slovenia
- Ljubljana School of Graphic Arts
