= Biennial of Graphic Arts (Ljubljana) =

Graphic art exhibition in Ljubljana, Slovenia

Coordinates: 46°3′16.94″N 14°29′34.84″E

The Biennial of Graphic Arts in Ljubljana, founded in 1955 at the Museum of Modern Art, is the world's oldest existing biennial exhibition of contemporary graphic arts. It was published by Zoran Kržišnik on the idea and endeavours of Božidar Jakac. It served from its beginnings as an international artistic event bringing together artists from both sides of the Iron Curtain despite the Cold War as well as from the Non-Aligned Movement members states. The Ljubljana Biennial of Graphic Arts also recognized and included new art trends and changes in style. At the local level, the Biennial introduced new contemporary art currents to the group of Slovenian graphic artists that became known internationally as the Ljubljana Graphic School. Since 1986, the venue of the Biennal has been the International Center of Graphic Arts Ljubljana.

== See also ==
- Academy of Fine Arts in Ljubljana
