= The Triumph of Flora =

Painting by Gabrijel Stupica

Triumph of Flora
- Zmagoslavje Flore (Slovene), Триумфът на флората (Bulgarian)
- Artist: Gabrijel Stupica
- Year: 1965
- Medium: tempera on canvas
- Dimensions: 249.5 cm × 146.5 cm (98.2 in × 57.7 in)
- Location: Museum of Modern Art; Ljubljana

Triumph of Flora (Slovenian: Zmagoslavje Flore) is a picture of the Slovenian and Yugoslav painter Gabrijel Stupica from 1965

== Description ==
Painted with tempera on canvas and has dimensions of 249.5 x 146.5 cm.

The picture is part of the collection of the Museum of Modern Art in Ljubljana, Slovenia.

== Analysis ==
Gabrijel Stupica is considered one of the best Slovenian and Yugoslav artists. The picture presents the image of a young, but actually looks at the old "bride", typical for his late or his white period. The picture is dominated by mostly white details - including a painted collage of objects covering, wreaths and necklaces, photos of bare naked body covered with "wedding bouquet" on the crotch of the girl. The images are filled with insinuations of evasive intimacy, sexuality, reaching puberty, not only visual changes that accompany it.
