= Janez Pristavec =

Slovenian painter (1947–2008)

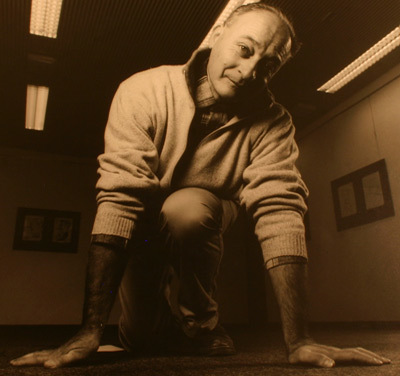
- Pristavec in 2006
- Born: 27 March 1947; Maribor, People's Republic of Slovenia, Yugoslavia
- Died: 28 May 2008 (aged 61); Maribor, Slovenia
- Citizenship: Slovenian
- Education: Academy of Fine Arts, University of Ljubljana
- Known for: Painting, drawing, printmaking, caricature

Janez Pristavec (27 March 1947 – 28 May 2008) was a Slovenian painter, printmaker and art educator associated with the cultural life of Maribor. His practice included painting, works on paper and portrait caricature.

== Life and career ==
Pristavec was born in Maribor. He graduated from the Academy of Fine Arts in Ljubljana in 1977. The Maribor Art Gallery lists Janez Bernik, Bogdan Borčič, Milan Butina, Zoran Didek, Nikolaj Omersa, Štefan Planinc, Marjan Pogačnik, Gabrijel Stupica and Apolonijo Zvest among his teachers. He was a member of the Maribor Society of Fine Artists and the Association of Slovene Fine Artists, and worked as an art teacher at the Secondary School of Civil Engineering in Maribor.

The RazUme database of Moderna galerija records his participation in exhibitions from 1980 onward. These included the 8th Yugoslav Drawing Exhibition at the Cabinet of Prints and Drawings of the Yugoslav Academy of Sciences and Arts in Zagreb in 1981, the group exhibition Barva (Colour) at the Rihard Jakopič exhibition venue in Ljubljana in 1988, and solo exhibitions in Maribor in 1990, 1994, 1998, 2005 and 2008.

For the 1994 exhibition at Razstavni salon Rotovž, the Maribor Art Gallery published a bilingual catalogue with an introductory text by art historian Edita Mileta. In 1998, the same venue presented Portret od realizma do slikovnega znaka (Portrait from Realism to Pictorial Sign).

In 2005, the Maribor Art Gallery mounted the exhibition Portretna karikatura (Portrait Caricature). The gallery described Pristavec as a city portraitist and chronicler who used a sketchbook to record residents of Maribor and visitors to the city. His book Srečanja (Encounters), a collection of portraits and caricatures with a foreword by Mario Berdič, was published by the Maribor Literary Society in 2006.

Pristavec died in Maribor in May 2008 at the age of 61.

His work is posthomously featured in a centenial catalogue made by Association of Visual Artists Maribor in 2020.

== Work ==
Pristavec worked in painting, drawing and printmaking. Portraiture and caricature became salient in the later part of his career. The title of his 1998 portrait exhibition framed this work as a movement "from realism to pictorial sign". His later portrait drawings were often made in public and recorded figures from Maribor's cultural and civic life; a selection was brought together in Srečanja.

His works entered public collections during his lifetime. A 1987 pencil drawing from the Hrib (Hill) cycle is held in the didactic collection of Galerija Miklova hiša. The collection of the Maribor Art Gallery includes Kvartet Feguš (Feguš Quartet, 2004).

Works by Pristavec
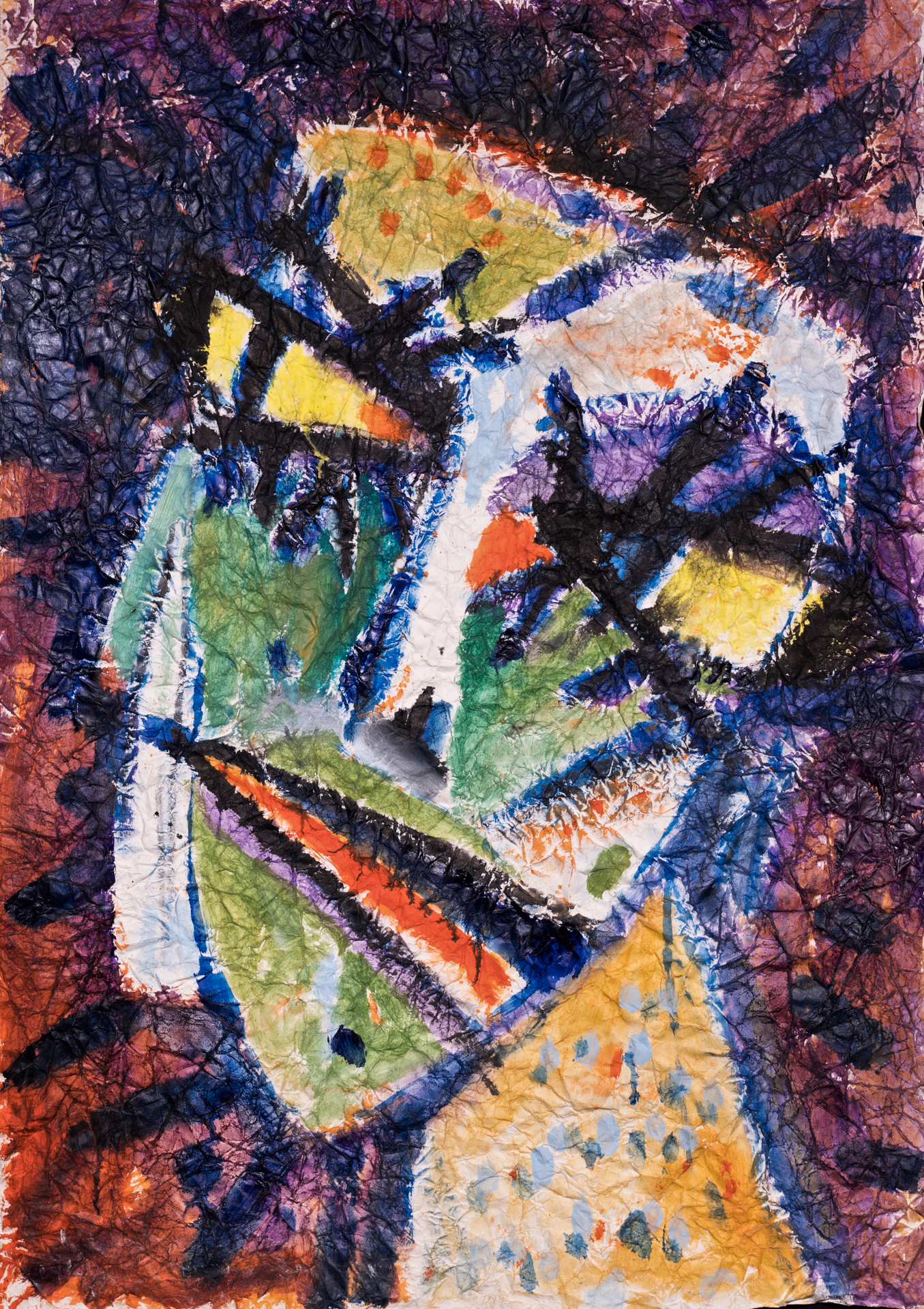
Masks 19

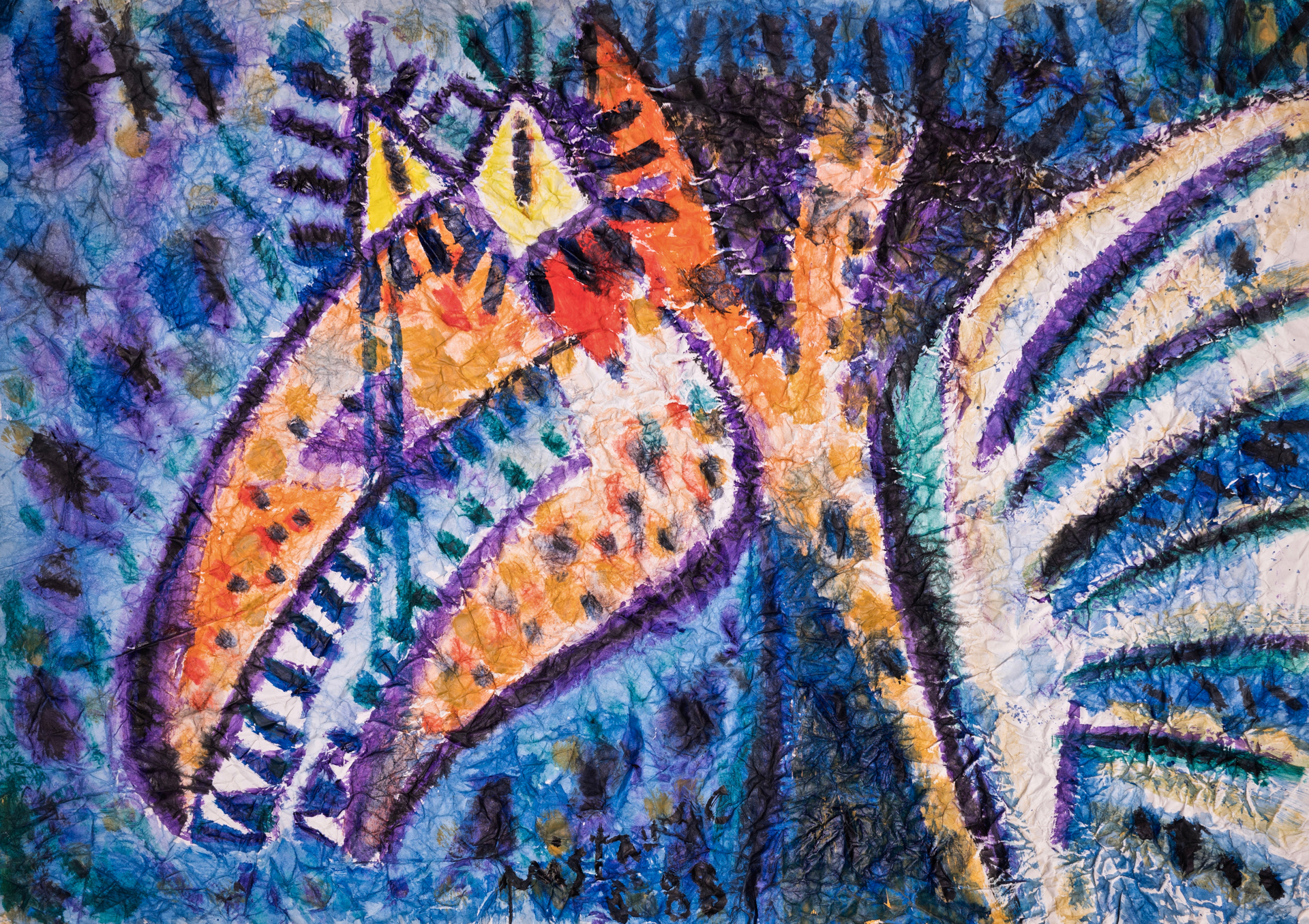
Masks Bird

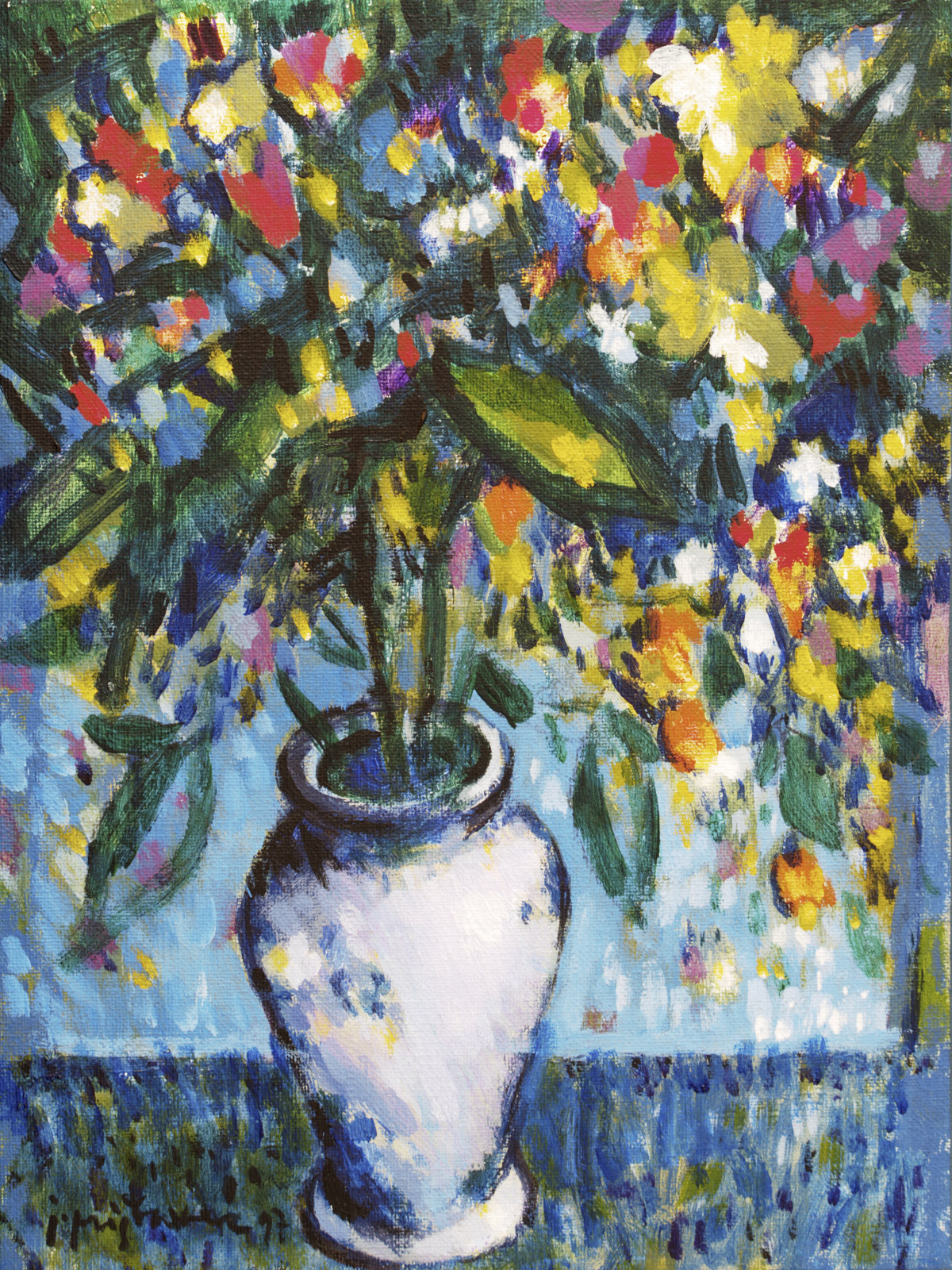
Still life 34

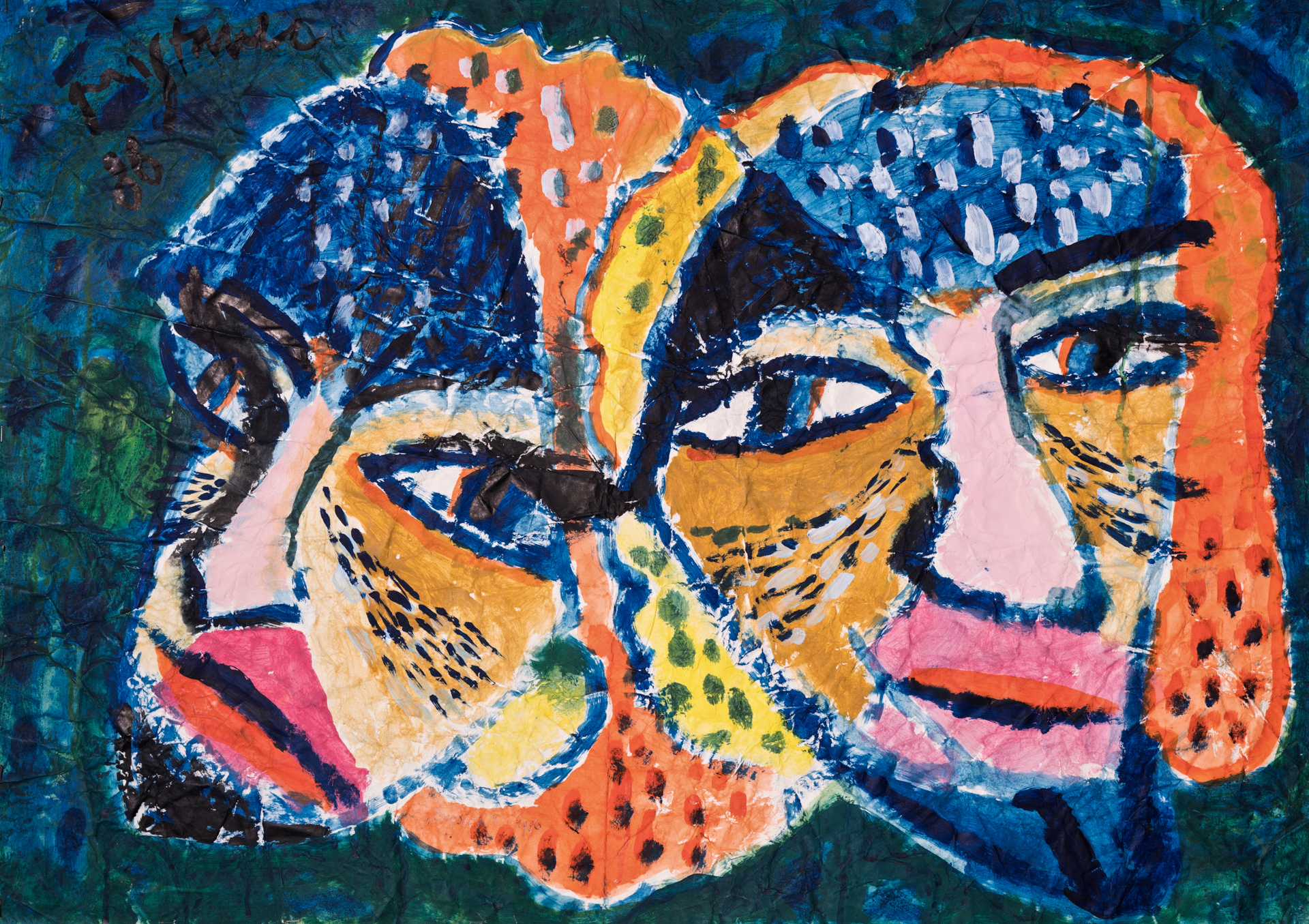
Masks 28

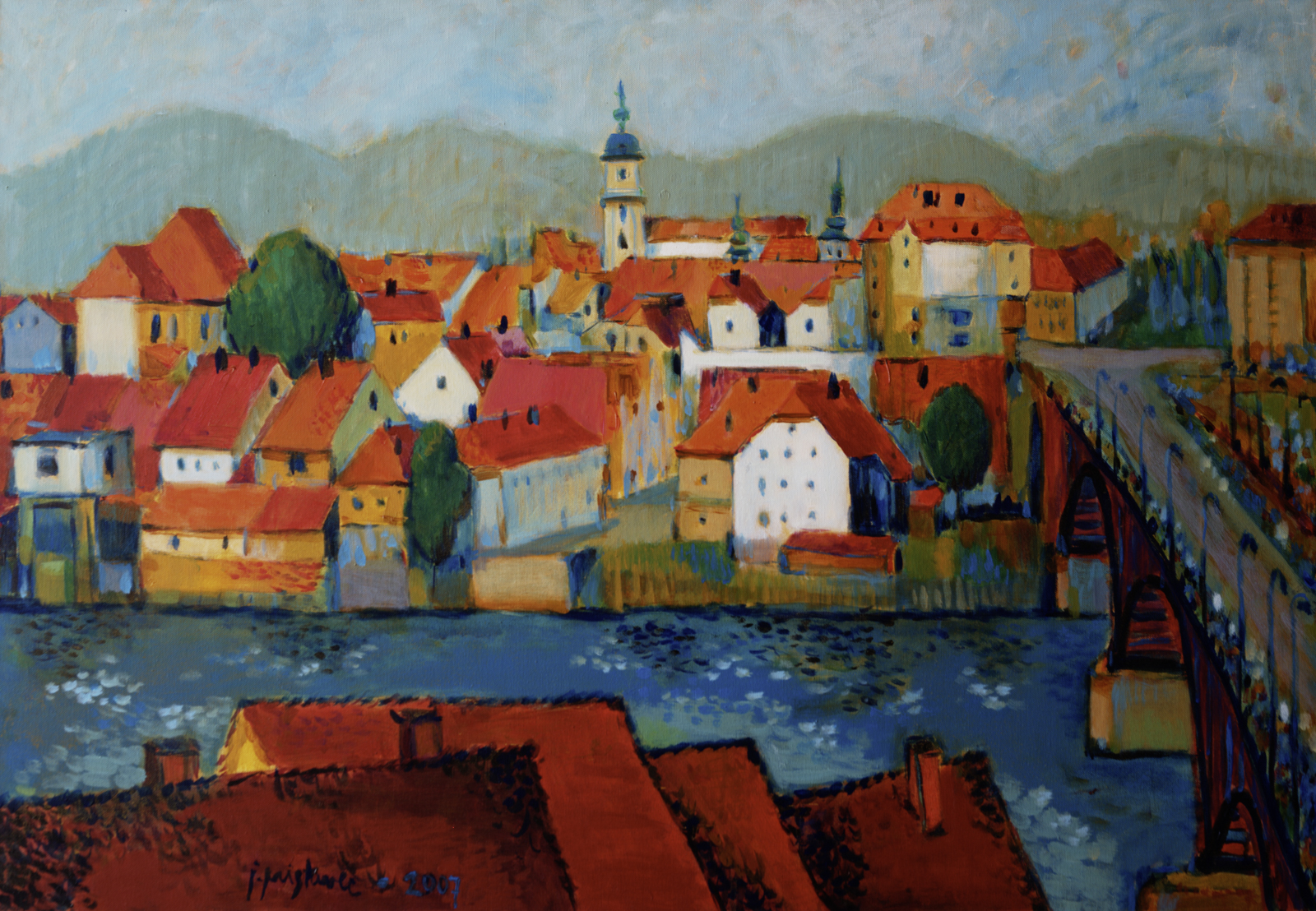
Maribor Lent 24

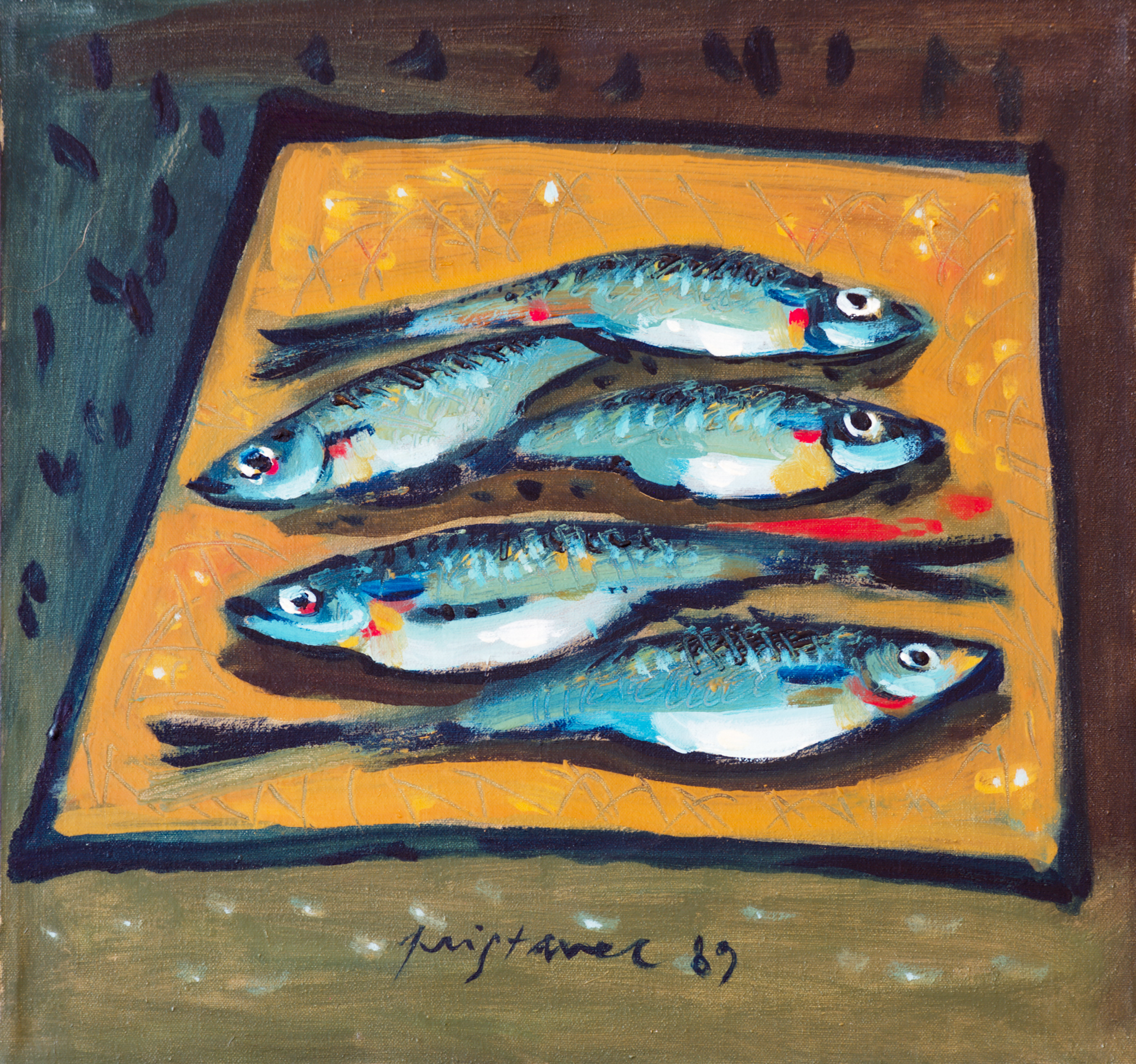
Fish series 21

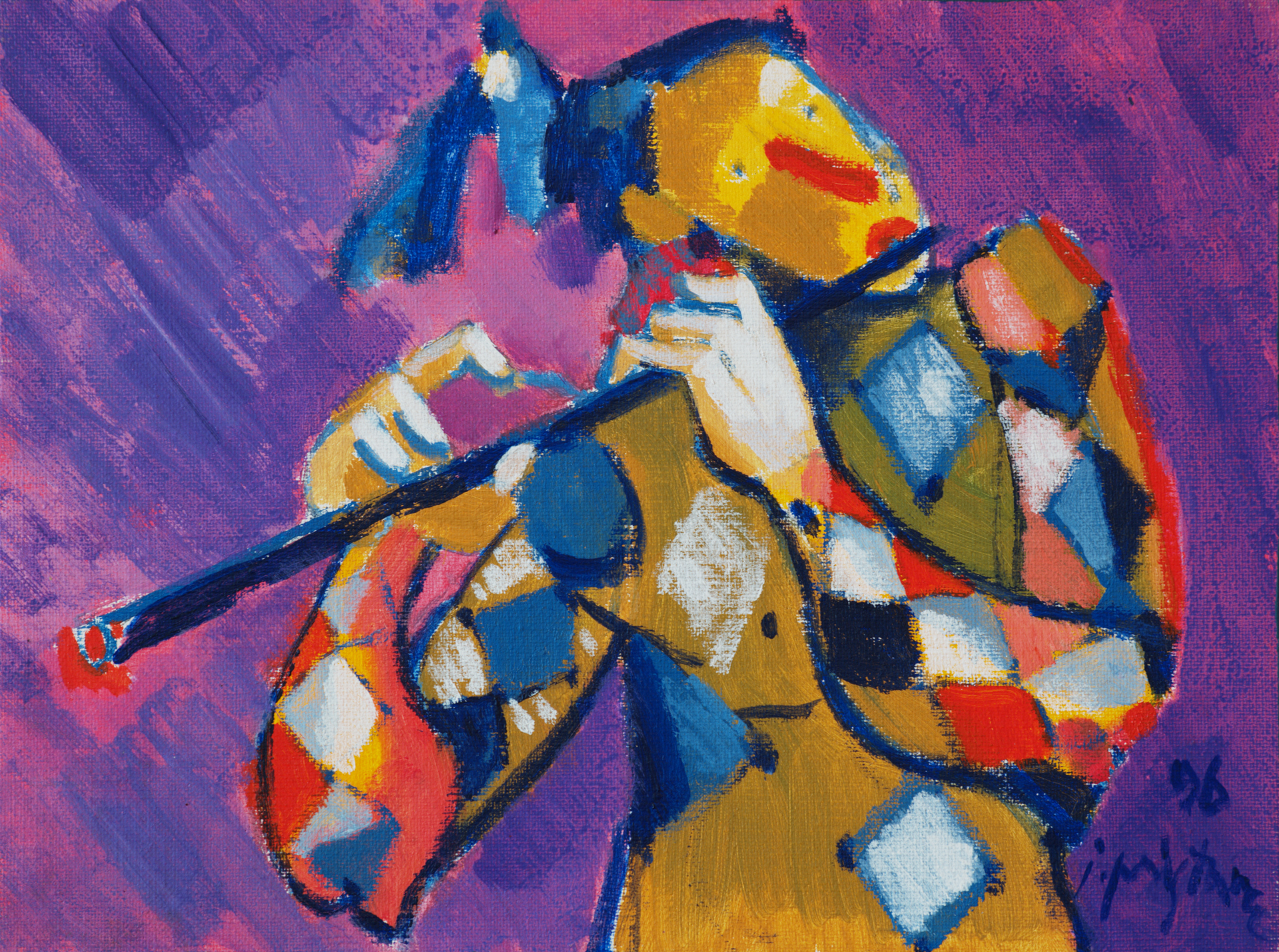
Flute player

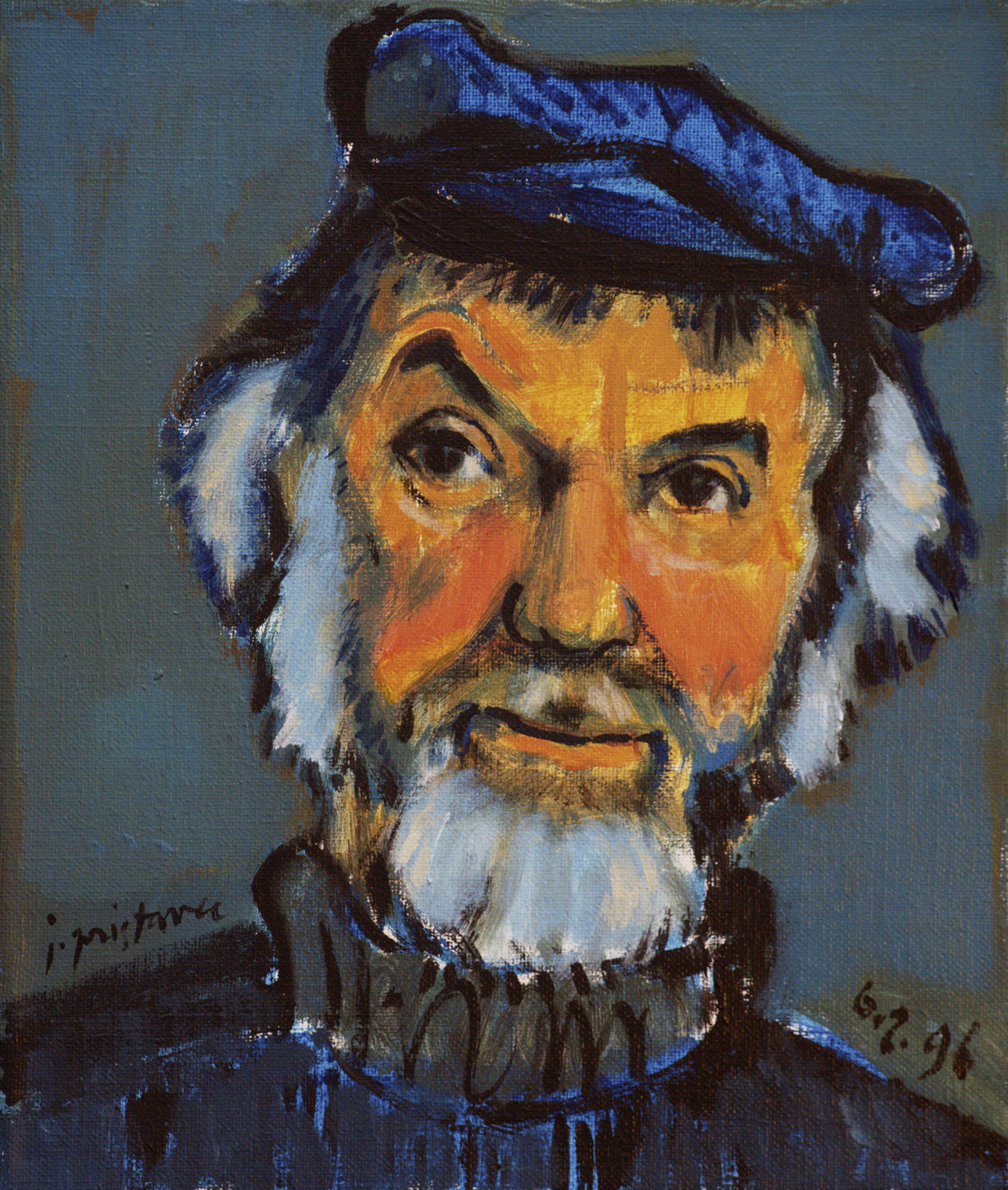
Portrait of Borcic Bogdan

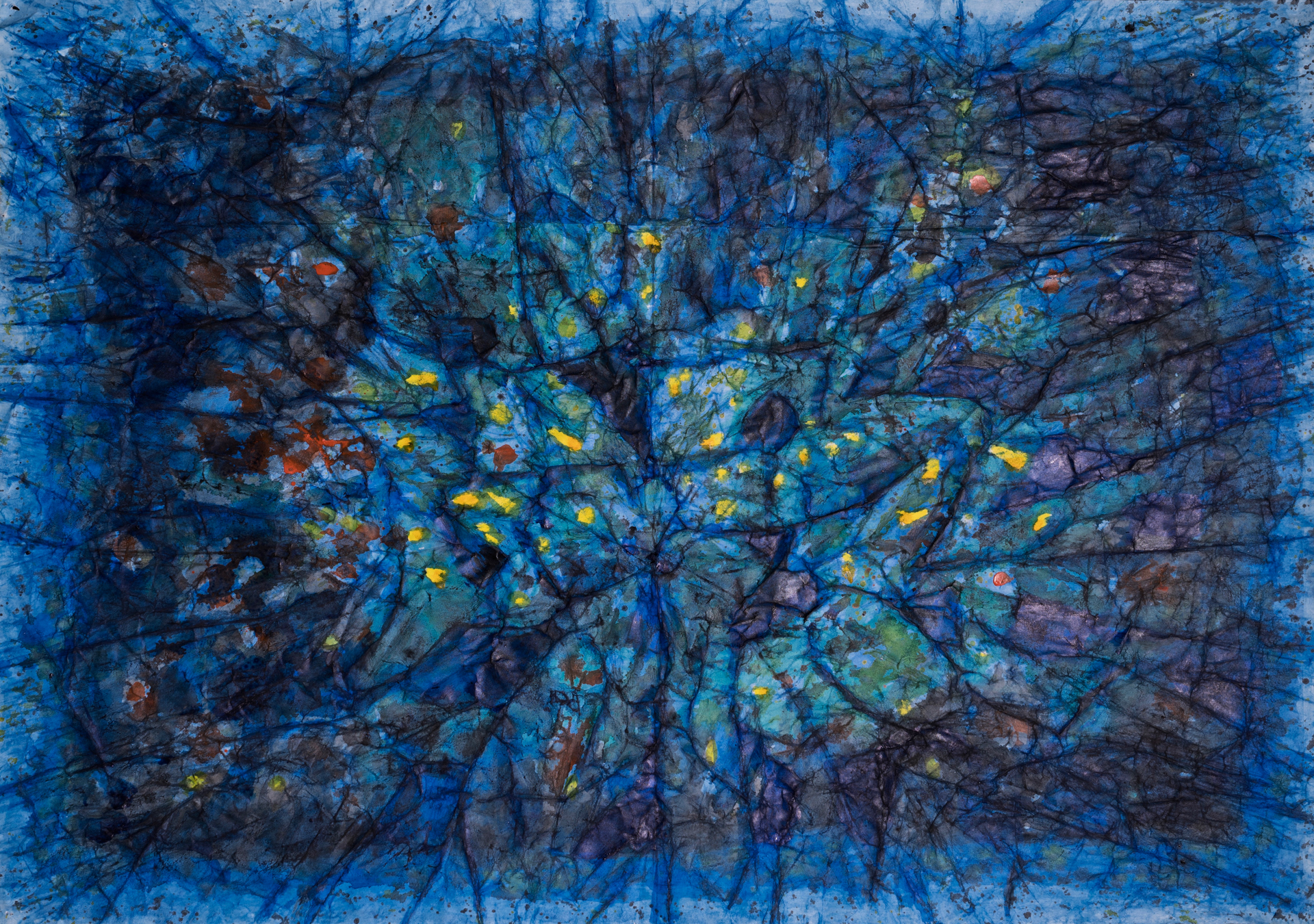
Colors 11

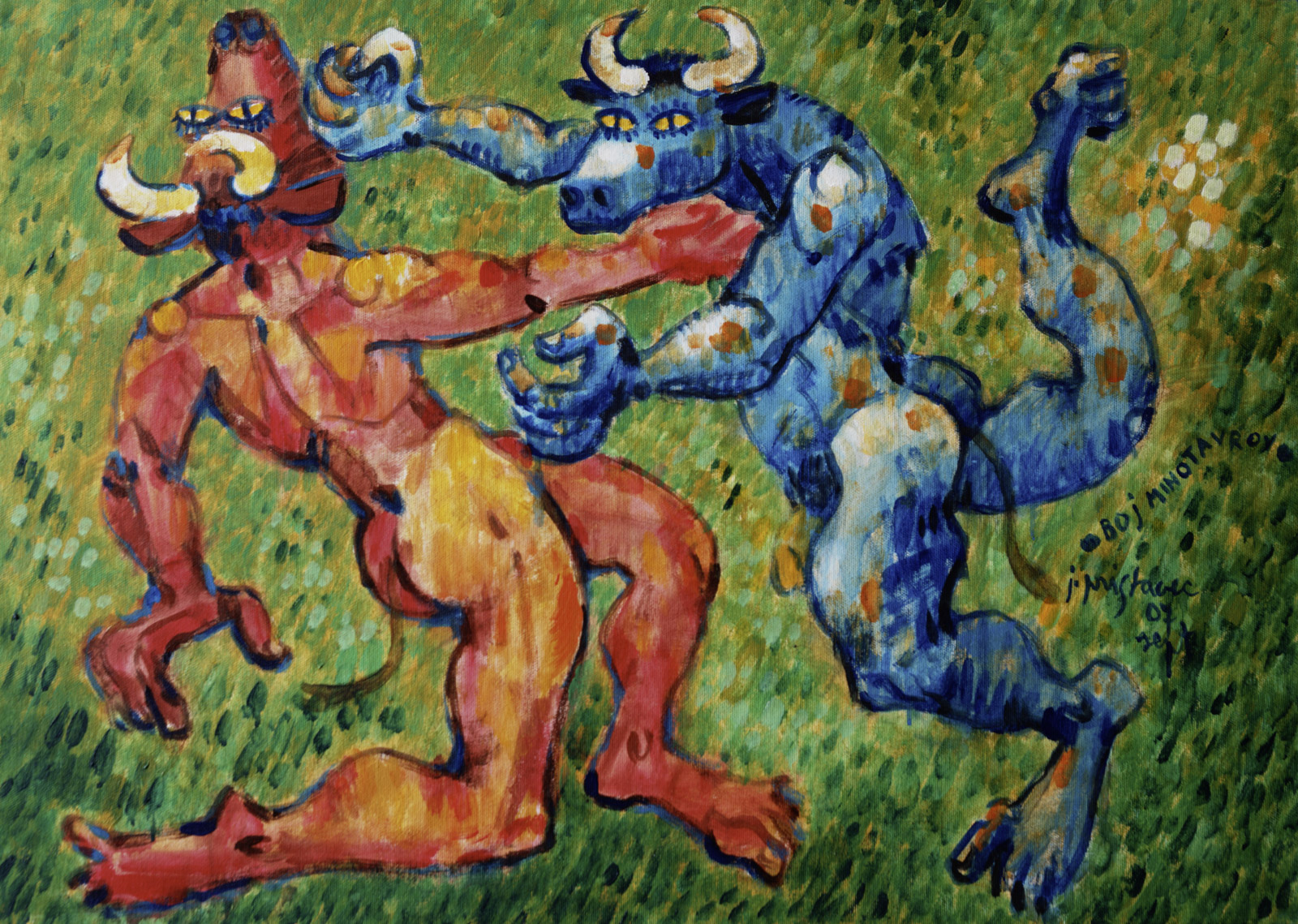
Mythology Fight of Minotaurs

== Artist evolution ==
=== Formative Years and Academy Studies ===
Pristavec began drawing during childhood. His early surviving works include landscapes, architecture, portraits, self-portraits, plants and scenes from Maribor and its surroundings. These drawings already demonstrate sustained attention to spatial organisation, proportion and the expressive possibilities of line.

Before entering the Academy, he explored pencil and ink drawing, drypoint, linocut and other graphic techniques. This period of largely independent study gave him considerable technical confidence before the beginning of his formal education.

At the Academy of Fine Arts, observational drawing was joined by the analytical study of anatomy, movement, descriptive geometry and colour relationships. His student works include studies of shells, animal bodies, the human skeleton and the female nude. They reveal an artist learning to understand the visible world not only through resemblance but through construction: the organisation of weight, rhythm, volume and internal structure.

The nude became one of his principal fields of experimentation. Initially grounded in observation, it was gradually simplified into planar and geometric relationships. Naturalistic colour gave way to stronger chromatic contrasts, while the body increasingly functioned as a structure through which Pristavec could investigate the relationship between figure and pictorial field.

=== Printmaking and Figural Transformation ===
During the late 1970s and early 1980s, Pristavec devoted considerable attention to printmaking. Linocuts, woodcuts and drypoints frequently depict animals, especially fish, frogs, reptiles and birds. The animal body offered a meeting point between close observation, symbolic meaning and formal transformation.

At the same time, the human figure became increasingly unstable. In the 1981 cycle Množice (Crowds), bodies expand, contract and merge into compact organic formations. Perspective is distorted, anatomy is exaggerated and the boundary between an individual figure and a collective mass becomes uncertain.

These drawings should not be understood merely as preparatory studies. They form an autonomous cycle in which line becomes capable of generating bodily volume, movement and psychological tension. Their deformed figures also anticipate Pristavec’s later interest in masks, hybrid beings and mythological bodies.

=== The Hill and the Discovery of Colour ===
A decisive change occurred after the 1983 Ex tempore painting event, when Pristavec became intensely interested in Meljski hrib, a hill rising above the industrial and residential landscape of Maribor. He observed it from different positions, at different times of day and under changing weather conditions.

The resulting cycle, generally known as The Hill, comprises an extensive group of works on paper produced principally between 1983 and 1985. The landscape motif is gradually transformed. At first the hill remains recognisable, but its contours progressively become bands, intervals, chromatic tensions and layered fields.

Yellow and orange assumed particular importance within this research. Pristavec used relatively small quantities of these colours to activate larger areas of darker, cooler or more restrained tones. Landscape was no longer simply represented. It became the starting point for an investigation of how visual observation, memory and emotional experience could be translated into colour.

The importance of The Hill lies precisely in this passage between motif and pictorial autonomy. The series does not mark a complete abandonment of nature. Instead, nature is internalised and reconstructed through colour.

=== Crumpled Paper, Masks and Chromatic Fields ===
From the middle of the 1980s, Pristavec began working with physically altered and crumpled sheets of paper. The folds, ridges and damaged surfaces were not accidental imperfections but active elements of the work. Paper ceased to function solely as a neutral support and became a material body that could be painted, folded, abraded and reactivated by colour.

The earliest works in this group often retain recognisable faces, masks or fragmentary figures. Their identity appears unstable, emerging from and disappearing into the irregular surface. The face becomes both image and object: a psychological presence, a painted sign and a materially fractured field.

In later works, especially those associated with the Colors cycle, recognisable motifs recede. Horizontal bands, vertical axes, chromatic layers and broken geometric structures begin to organise the sheet. Yet these works should not be separated too sharply from the masks and figures that preceded them. Their colour fields retain a bodily character, while traces of face, landscape and spatial depth continue to inhabit the abstract surface.

Pristavec’s abstraction was therefore not a rejection of the visible world. It developed from prolonged looking—from landscape, leaves, bodies and faces—and preserved the memory of these sources even when they were no longer immediately recognisable.

=== The Return of the Figure ===
During the early 1990s, the figure reappeared with renewed intensity. This was not a return to the kind of representation practised before the abstract cycles. The body now carried the experience of fragmentation, chromatic division and material instability.

The Minotaur drawings of 1992 occupy an important position in this development. Human and animal anatomy are joined in a hybrid body that embodies physical force, vulnerability, conflict and confinement. The cycle forms a bridge between Pristavec’s earlier animal imagery and the mythological paintings of his final years.

The Harlequin works, produced principally during the 1990s, introduce a different kind of transformed figure. Harlequin is simultaneously performer, mask and psychologically divided individual. Patterned clothing breaks the body into chromatic segments, while theatrical identity becomes a means of examining concealment, exposure and the instability of the self.

Nudes, animals, portraits and figures continued to appear throughout these years. Pristavec’s artistic development should consequently be understood as a network of returns rather than a progression through strictly separated stylistic period

=== Portraiture and the Social Archive ===
Portraiture became one of the central areas of Pristavec’s later work. His portraits on canvas give the face material and chromatic density, while the extensive portraits on paper preserve the speed and risk of direct observation.

The sitters include family members, friends, artists, writers, musicians, actors, cultural figures and people from the Maribor environment. Together, these works form more than a gallery of individual likenesses. They constitute a visual archive of personal relationships and of the cultural life surrounding the artist.

Pristavec continually tested how far a face could be transformed without losing its identity. Likeness might be preserved by the inclination of a head, the weight of an eyelid, a particular profile, hairstyle or expression. Distortion and abbreviation were not necessarily departures from recognition; they could become its most effective instruments.

Around 1999, public drawing assumed growing importance. As Pristavec later recalled, drawing outside the studio was also connected with the personal need to overcome solitude following the death of his wife. He began portraying people at exhibitions, literary evenings, concerts, social gatherings and in public spaces.

In these works, portraiture became an encounter involving the artist, sitter and sometimes an audience. The speed of execution was both an artistic method and a condition of the event. Names, dates, dedications and brief comments frequently remained visible on the sheet, turning each drawing into a record of a particular meeting.

Many of these works were later brought together in the 2006 publication Janez Pristavec: Srečanja (Encounters), with a foreword by Mario Berdič. The book transformed a series of temporary social occasions into a more lasting collective portrait of Maribor and its cultural community.

=== Late Mythological Paintings ===
During the final years of his life, while facing prolonged illness, Pristavec turned increasingly towards mythological and sacred subjects. Between approximately 2006 and 2008, he produced a concentrated group of paintings based on Greek mythology, biblical and Christian narratives and other archetypal themes.

These works include Nereids, Amazons, the Minotaur, mounted figures, winged horses, sacrificial scenes and apocalyptic riders. They are not conventional illustrations of established stories. Pristavec condensed their narratives into confrontations between bodies, colours and forces: ascent and fall, desire and violence, mortality and transformation.

The late mythological paintings unite many of the concerns that had shaped his work over several decades. Animal and human bodies merge, colour acquires symbolic intensity, and the figure is subjected to the same processes of fragmentation and reconstruction that had previously shaped the crumpled-paper works, masks and abstract colour fields.

Illness forms part of the historical context of these paintings, but it should not become their only interpretative key. The works are not merely documents of physical decline or a final testament. They represent an artist returning to the body and to narrative with extraordinary concentration, bringing together observation, memory, cultural tradition and personal experience.

== Exhibitions ==
A complete list of 85 exhibitions is available on RazUme, a database of all slovenian painters. Solo exhibitions at the Maribor Art Gallery and its Razstavni salon Rotovž were accompanied by catalogues in 1994 and 1998.

After his death, selections of Pristavec's portraits and nudes were shown at the Gallery of the Maribor Society of Fine Artists in 2009 and 2010. In 2012–2013 his work was included in the Maribor Art Gallery exhibition Almost Spring: 100 Years of Slovene Art, a survey assembled from Slovenian museum and gallery collections. Works by Pristavec from the Maribor Art Gallery collection were also included in a 2018 selection by sculptor Vlasta Zorko and in Spekter: 70 Years of the UGM Collection, which opened in 2024.

== Selected publications ==
- Pristavec, Janez; Mileta, Edita (1994). Janez Pristavec: slike [Janez Pristavec: Paintings] (in Slovenian and English). Maribor: Umetnostna galerija Maribor. OCLC 442579947.
- Janez Pristavec: Portret od realizma do slikovnega znaka (Janez Pristavec: Portrait from Realism to Pictorial Sign). Maribor: Umetnostna galerija Maribor, 1998.
- Pristavec, Janez (2006). Srečanja [Encounters] (in Slovenian). Maribor: Mariborska literarna družba. ISBN 961-6483-54-4.
- Pogačar Vojko, Primož Premzl (2020), Monografija Društva likovnih umetnikov Maribor ob stoletnici organizirane dejavnosti v okoljih severovzhodne Slovenije, Maribor, DLUM, ISBN 978-961-91530-9-3
