= Sedej =

Sedej is a Slavic surname. Notable people with the surname include:

- Aljaž Sedej (born 1988), Slovenian judoka
- Maksim Sedej (1909–1974), Slovenian painter
