= Škuc Gallery =

Slovenian comtemporary art gallery in Ljubljana

Coordinates: 46°2′49.4″N 14°30′23.8″E

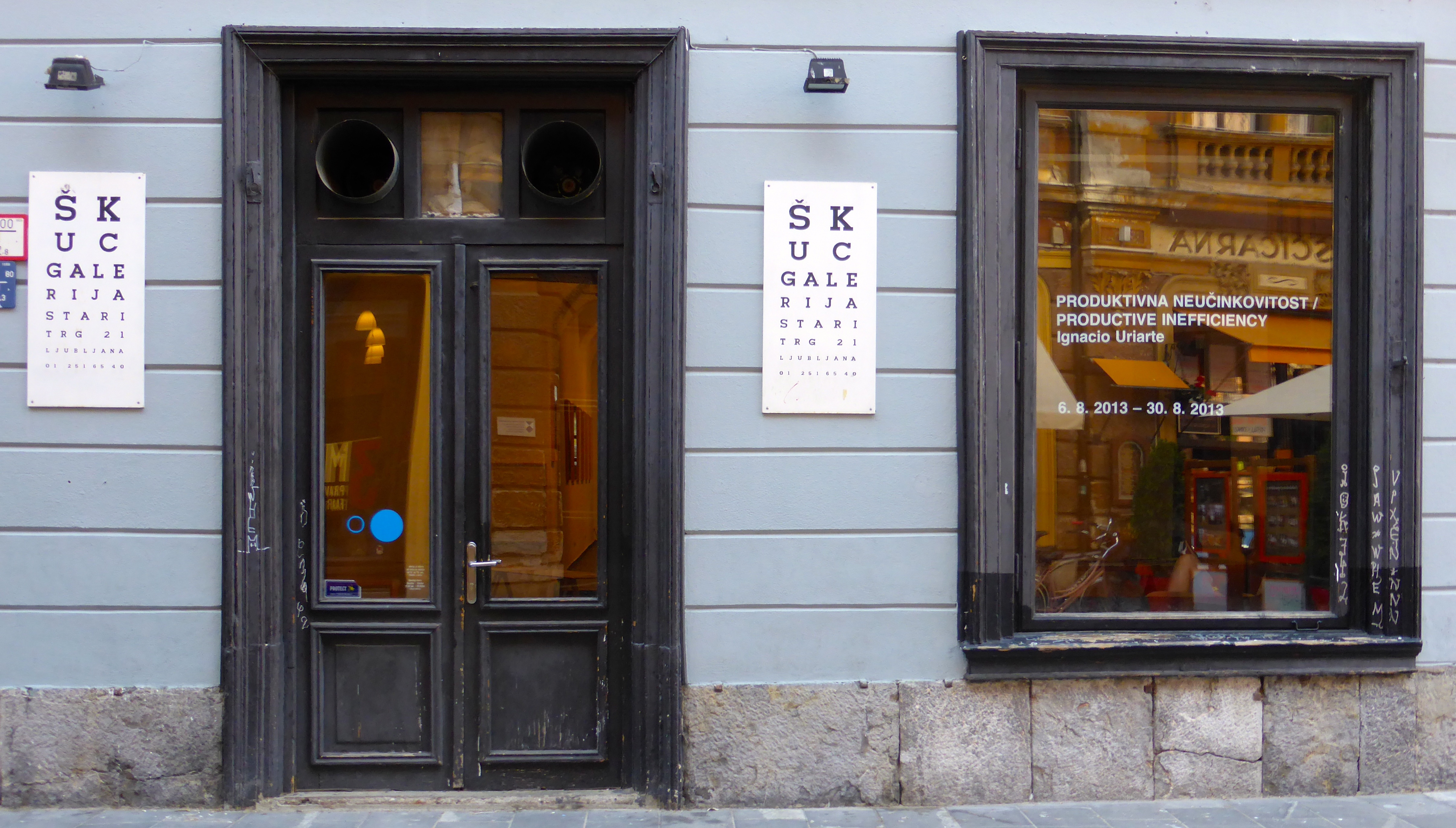
Entrance to the gallery

Škuc Gallery, part of Slovenia's Student Cultural Centre (ŠKUC), is a contemporary art gallery located on Stari trg 21 in Ljubljana, Slovenia. Established in 1978, it operates as a central venue for artistic and social initiatives, including visual arts, music, and publishing. The gallery's focus is on contemporary art and social issues and engagement.

== History ==
The inception of Škuc Gallery was marked by an exhibition showcasing the OHO group, symbolizing a shift towards the eclectic art of the 1980s. In the early 1980s, under the guidance of Barbara Borčić and Marina Gržinić, Škuc Gallery provided a platform for emerging artists to explore diverse artistic expressions rooted in social critique. This period was notable for its interdisciplinary and open approach, integrating alternative art practices to challenge traditional art perceptions. The gallery also became a hub for subcultural experimentation in Ljubljana's cultural and alternative scenes. The Neue Slowenische Kunst (NSK) movement was closely associated with Škuc. Despite minimal financial support, the gallery thrived, supported by the dedication of its staff and artists. The 1990s saw Škuc Gallery transition into a professionally-run contemporary art space, adapting to Slovenia's changing socioeconomic context. The gallery's roots are intertwined with the broader ŠKUC association, which has significantly impacted various cultural and social fields, including the LGBTQ movement and the arts. ŠKUC has been instrumental in launching the careers of many artists who later gained international recognition, such as Marjetica Potrč, Dušan Mandič, and Duba Sambolec.

== Artistic program ==
Škuc Gallery primarily exhibits the art of Slovenian contemporary artists. In 2010, the gallery has also hosted exhibitions of international interest such as "Become," which exhibited works by German-born Ljubljana-Amsterdam artist Ulay. Another notable international project was "Alternative Economics, Alternative Societies" by Austrian artist Oliver Ressler, focusing on self-management and alternative economic models. This installation, first exhibited in 2003, showcased videotaped statements from scholars, artists, and activists, reflecting on alternative economic systems and societies. The association's publishing arm specializes in LGBTQ literature. The gallery also hosts Europe's oldest LGBTQ film festival.

== See also ==
- List of art galleries in Slovenia
