= List of art galleries in Slovenia =

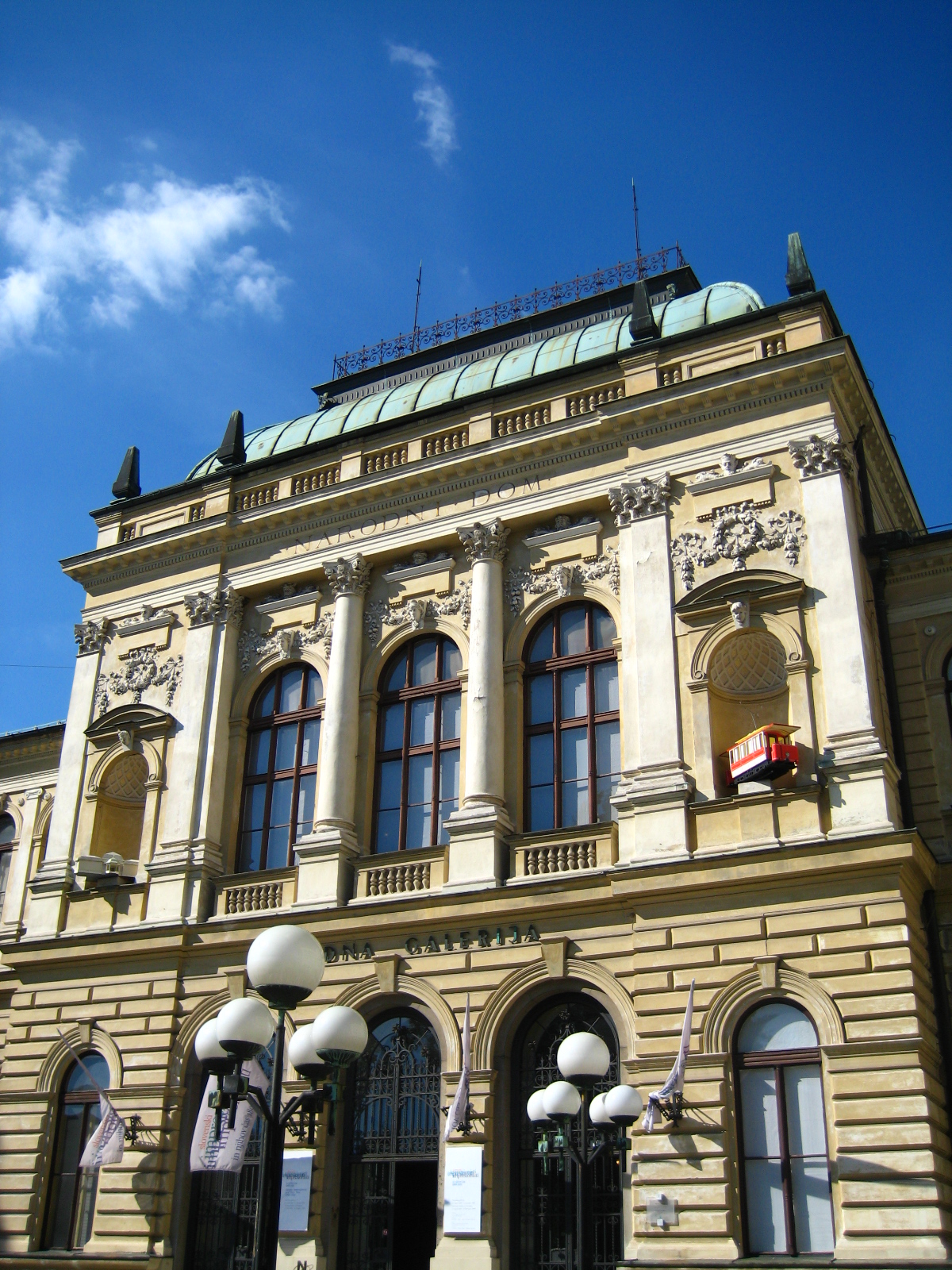
National Gallery of Slovenia

This is a list of art galleries in Slovenia, including national institutions, contemporary art spaces, regional museums with gallery departments, and other notable venues dedicated to visual arts. The list includes publicly funded galleries as well as independent and non-profit exhibition spaces, and provides basic information on their locations and founding dates.

(Only galleries with verifiable sources and established exhibition activity are included.)

Gallery name	Location	Opening date
National Gallery of Slovenia	Ljubljana	1918
Moderna galerija (Museum of Modern Art)	Ljubljana	1947
Cukrarna Gallery	Ljubljana	2021
Škuc Gallery	Ljubljana	1978
MGLC – International Centre of Graphic Arts	Ljubljana	1986
City Art Gallery (MGML)	Ljubljana	1960
Bežigrad Galleries 1 & 2	Ljubljana	1979
Gallery Y	Ljubljana	2018
Koroška Gallery of Fine Arts (KGLU)	Slovenj Gradec / Ravne	1957
Božidar Jakac Art Museum	Kostanjevica na Krki	1974
Piran Coastal Galleries	Piran / Koper	1976
Forma Viva Sculpture Parks	Various locations	1961
Lokar Gallery	Ljubljana	2011
Layer House	Kranj	2011
Gorenjska Museum – Gallery Dept.	Kranj	1953
Notranjska Museum – Gallery Dept.	Postojna	1948
Velenje Gallery	Velenje	1971
