= Piran Coastal Galleries =

Coordinates: 45°31′43.85″N 13°34′6.27″E

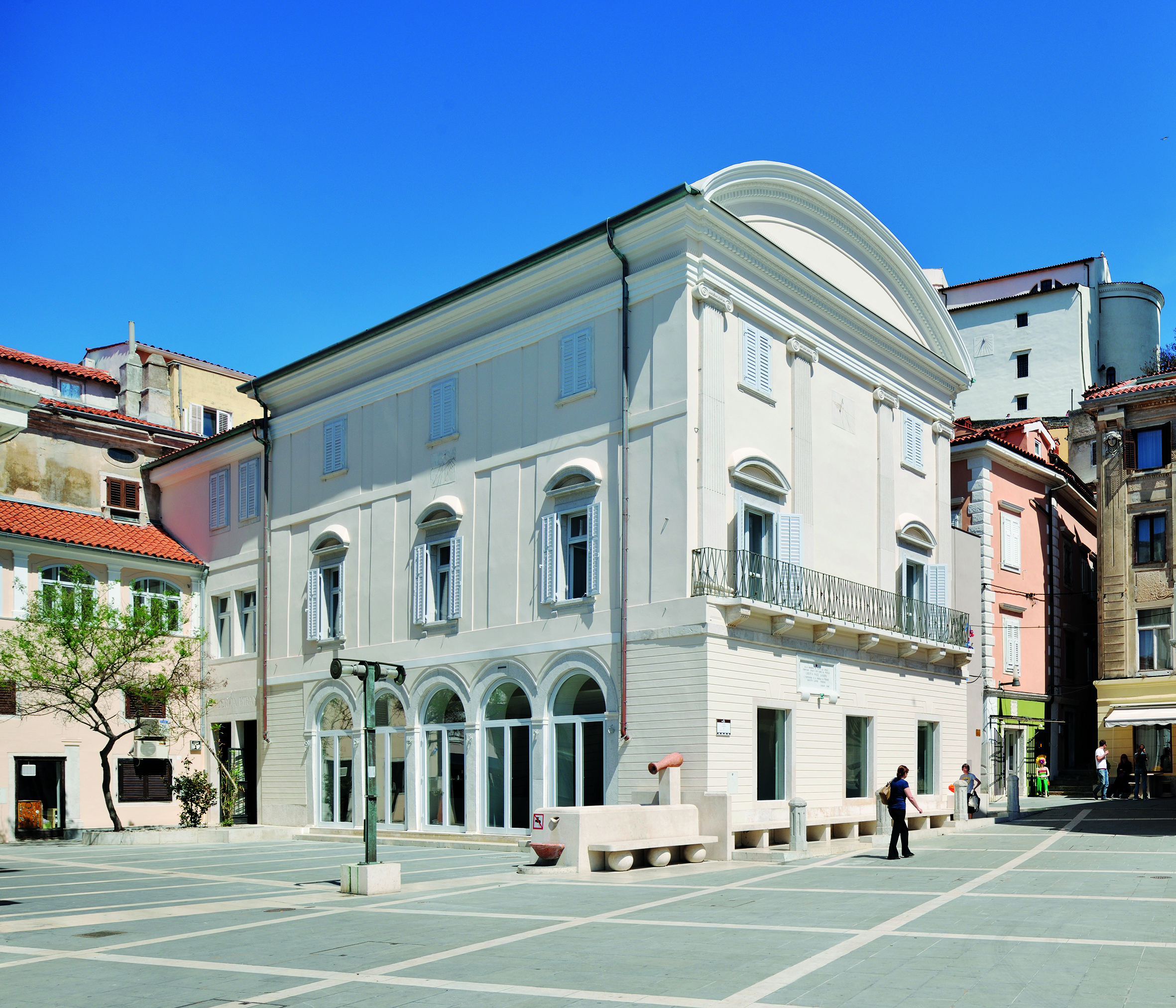
Piran Civic Gallery, Tartini Square, Piran. Exhibition space and administrative headquarters of Piran Coastal Galleries.

Piran Coastal Galleries (Slovene: Obalne galerije Piran, Italian: Gallerie Costiere Pirano) is a public institution, encompassing a group of six contemporary art galleries. Two galleries are located in Piran, two of them in Koper, and two in Portorož. From 1992 to 1997, the institution also operated a gallery called A+A in Madrid. The gallery was subsequently relocated to Venice and remained active until 2013. The institution is the center of contemporary art in Slovenian Littoral, one of the four most influential art galleries in Slovenia, and used to be the only one having an outpost abroad, in Venice. They present Slovenian as well as international contemporary artists, keep a rich art museum collection, publish art books and catalogues of exhibitions, and manage a library of modern art. The institution produces over one third of the countries entire gallery program.

== Financing ==
The galleries spend approximately 750,000 euros annually. Four fifths of the sum are contributed by the state, which in 2010 was 5% of the state money earmarked for galleries. 106,000 euros were contributed by the Municipality of Piran, and 21,000 euros by the City Municipality of Koper. Starting from 2012, Koper has stopped financing the institution.

== History and program ==
The institution was established in 1974, and opened its doors to the public in 1976. Approximately one half of its program is created in Koper, and one half in Piran. Each year, it organises art events, such as:

- Ex-Tempore Piran (International Painting and Ceramics Competition),
- Piranski dnevi arhitekture (Piran Days of Architecture) and Nagrada Piranesi (Piranesi Prize),
- Multimedijska delavnica (Multimedia Workshop) Genius Loci Lera
- Mednarodni kiparski simpozij Forma viva Portorož (International Sculpture Symposium Forma Viva Portorož)
- Other educational events, workshops and lectures.

== Gallery locations ==
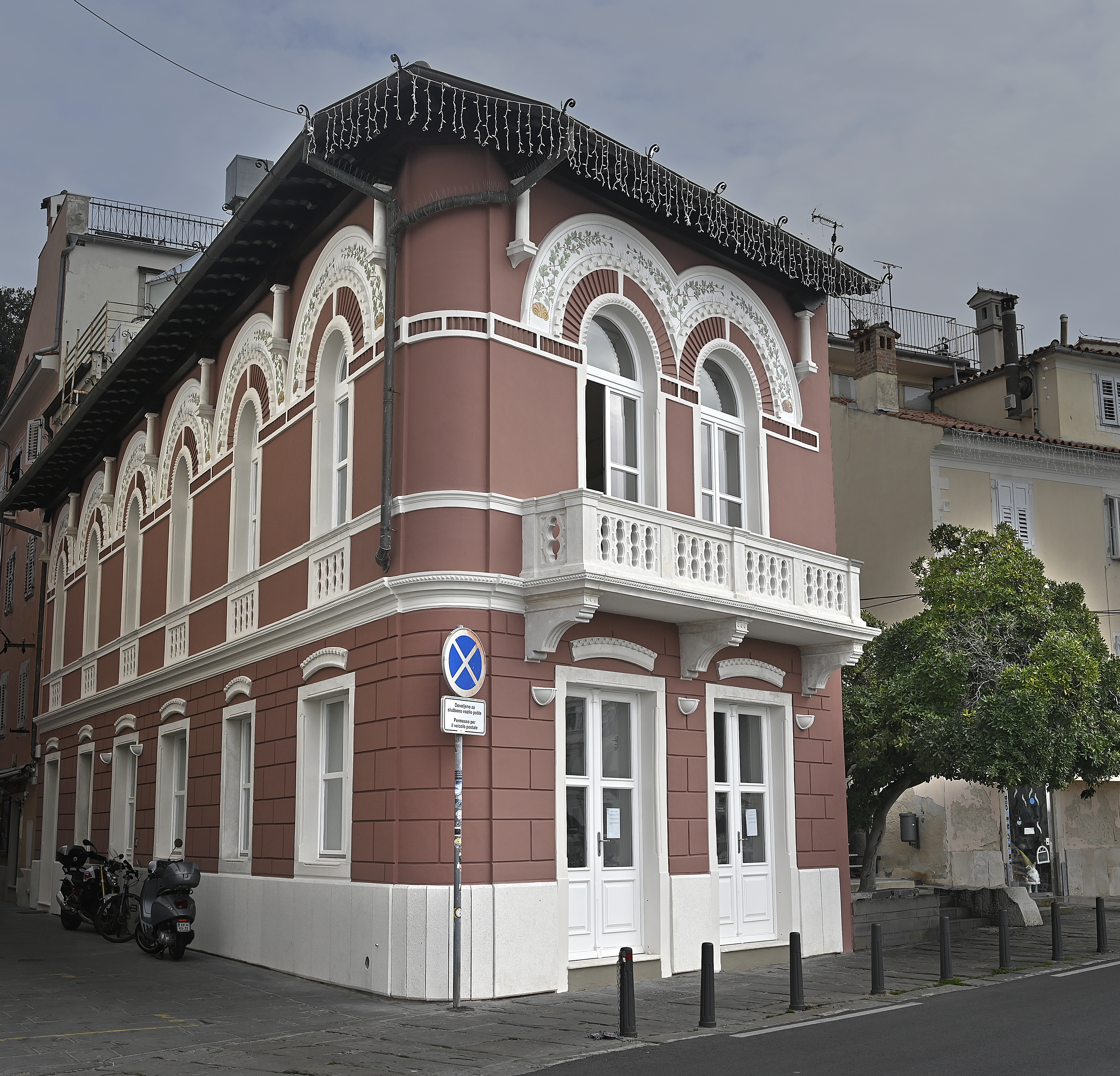
Herman Pečarič Gallery, Piran. One of the galleries operated by Piran Coastal Galleries.

The institution encompasses the following galleries:

In Piran:

- Piran Civic Gallery: From 2010 till 2012, the gallery has been renovated by plans of the architect Boris Podrecca.
- Herman Pečarič Gallery

In Koper:

- Loža Gallery
- Meduza Gallery

In Portorož:

- Monfort Gallery
- Sculpture Park Forma Viva

== See also ==
- List of art galleries in Slovenia
