= Gunclje =

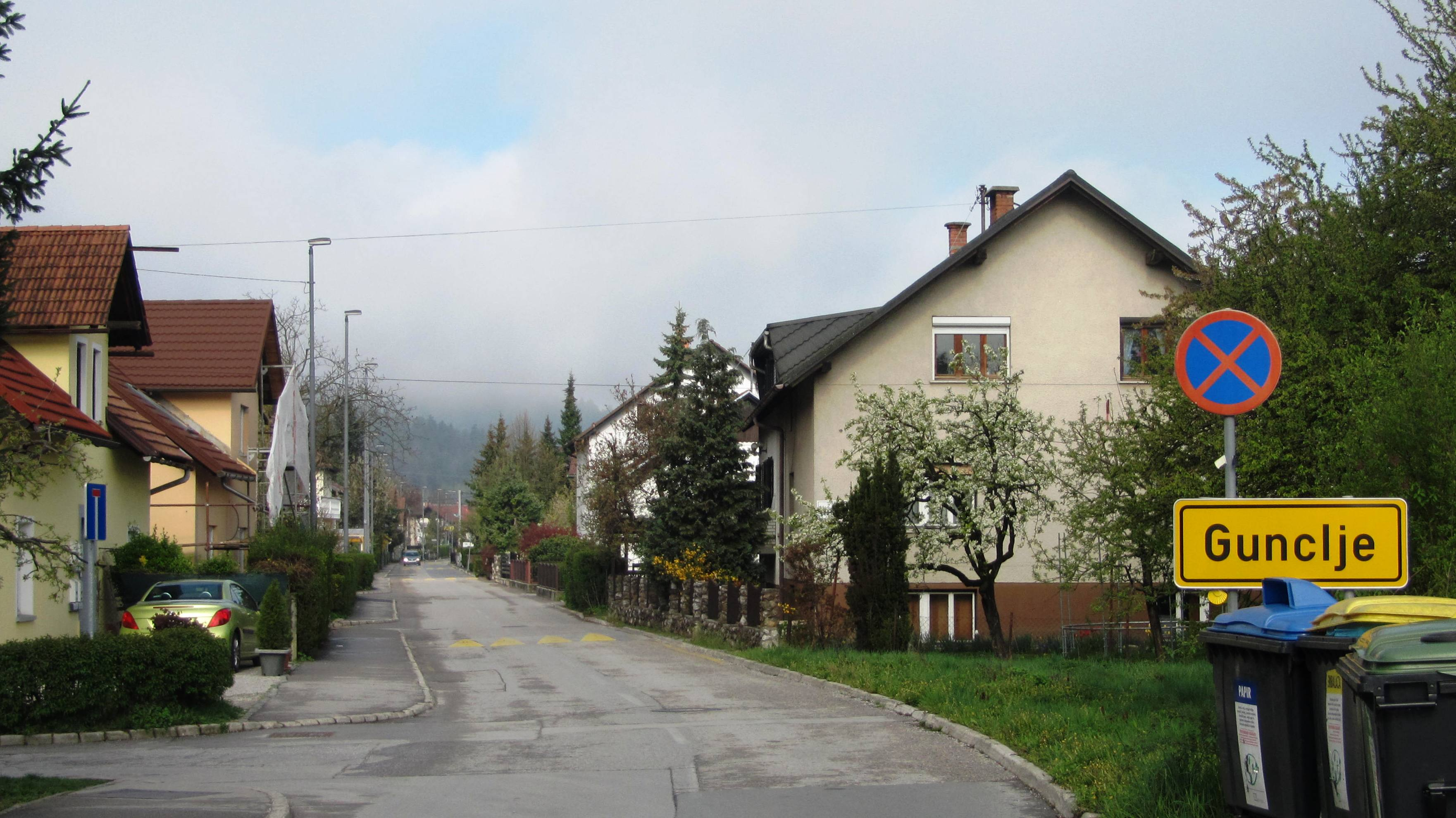

- Location in Slovenia
- Coordinates: 46°6′07.71″N 14°27′05.40″E
- Country: Slovenia
- Traditional region: Upper Carniola
- Statistical region: Central Slovenia
- Municipality: Ljubljana

Area
  - Total: 0.80 km^{2} (0.31 sq mi)
- Elevation: 319 m (1,047 ft)

Population (2002)
  - Total: cca. 1,000
- Postal code: 1210

Gunclje (pronounced [ˈɡuːntsljɛ]; German: Gunzle) is a settlement in central Slovenia, immediately northwest of the capital Ljubljana. It belongs to the Šentvid District of the City Municipality of Ljubljana. It is part of the traditional region of Upper Carniola and is now included with the rest of the municipality in the Central Slovenia Statistical Region.

== Name ==
Gunclje was first attested in written sources in 1430 as Güntzleinsdorff, and later as zu Güntzlach in 1438 and Künczlach in 1455 (both based on the Slovene locative plural) and Güntzla (in 1449), among other spellings. The name Gunclje is derived from the Slavic personal name *Guncelj (derived in turn from Old High German Gunzelîn, a diminutive of Gunzo), and likely refers to an early inhabitant of the place.

== History ==
Gunclje was annexed by Šentvid in 1961, ending its existence as a separate settlement. In 1974, Šentvid, together with Gunclje, was annexed by Ljubljana.

== Cultural heritage ==
The village core of Gunclje, extending from the chapel-shrine in the center of the village to a crucifix shrine at the edge of the woods, has been registered as cultural heritage. The village core preserves the character as a linear settlement (a village lying almost entirely along a single road) with perpendicularly placed houses and farm buildings aligned with them.

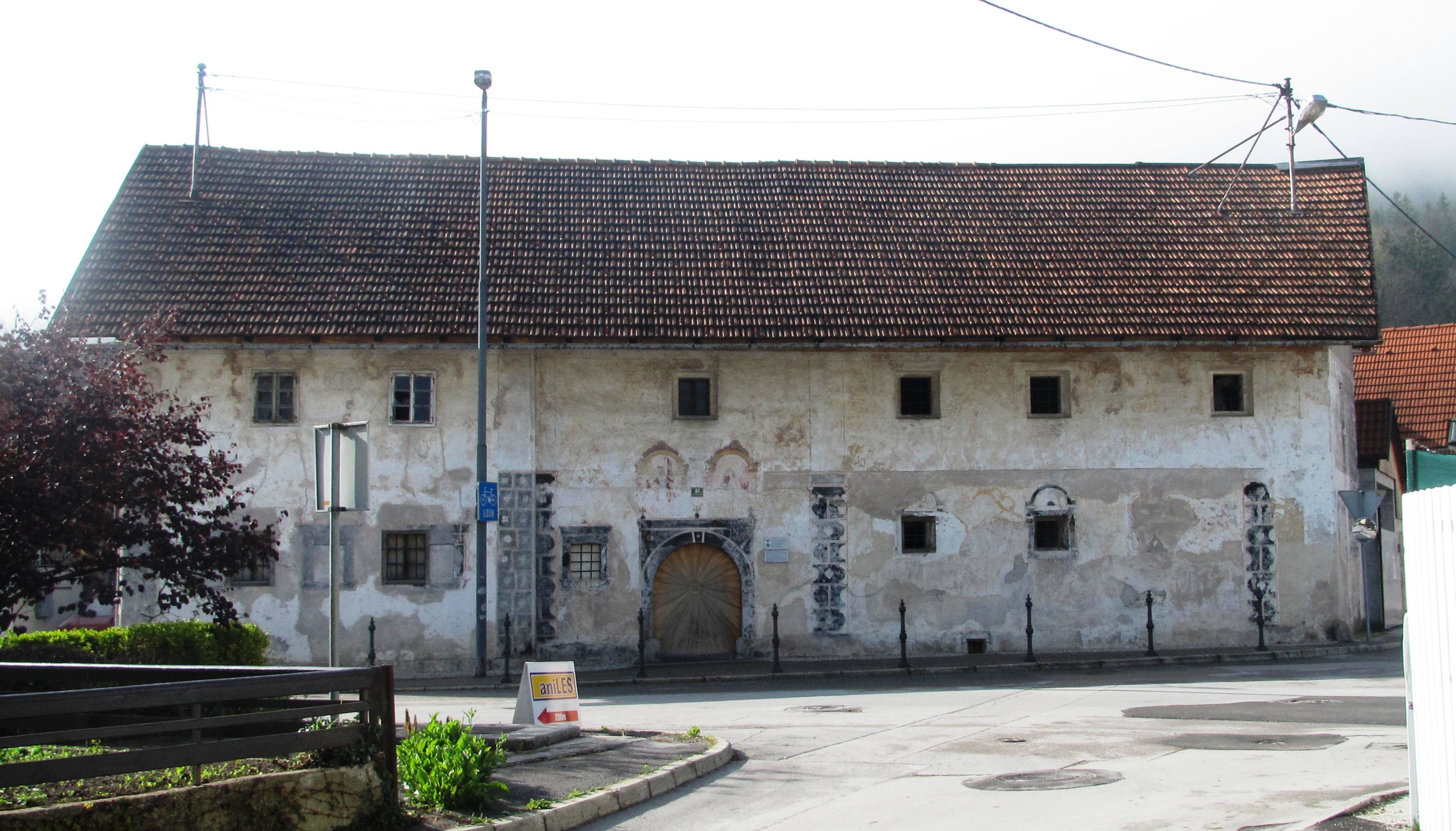
The 17th-century Krvina House, the oldest house in Gunclje

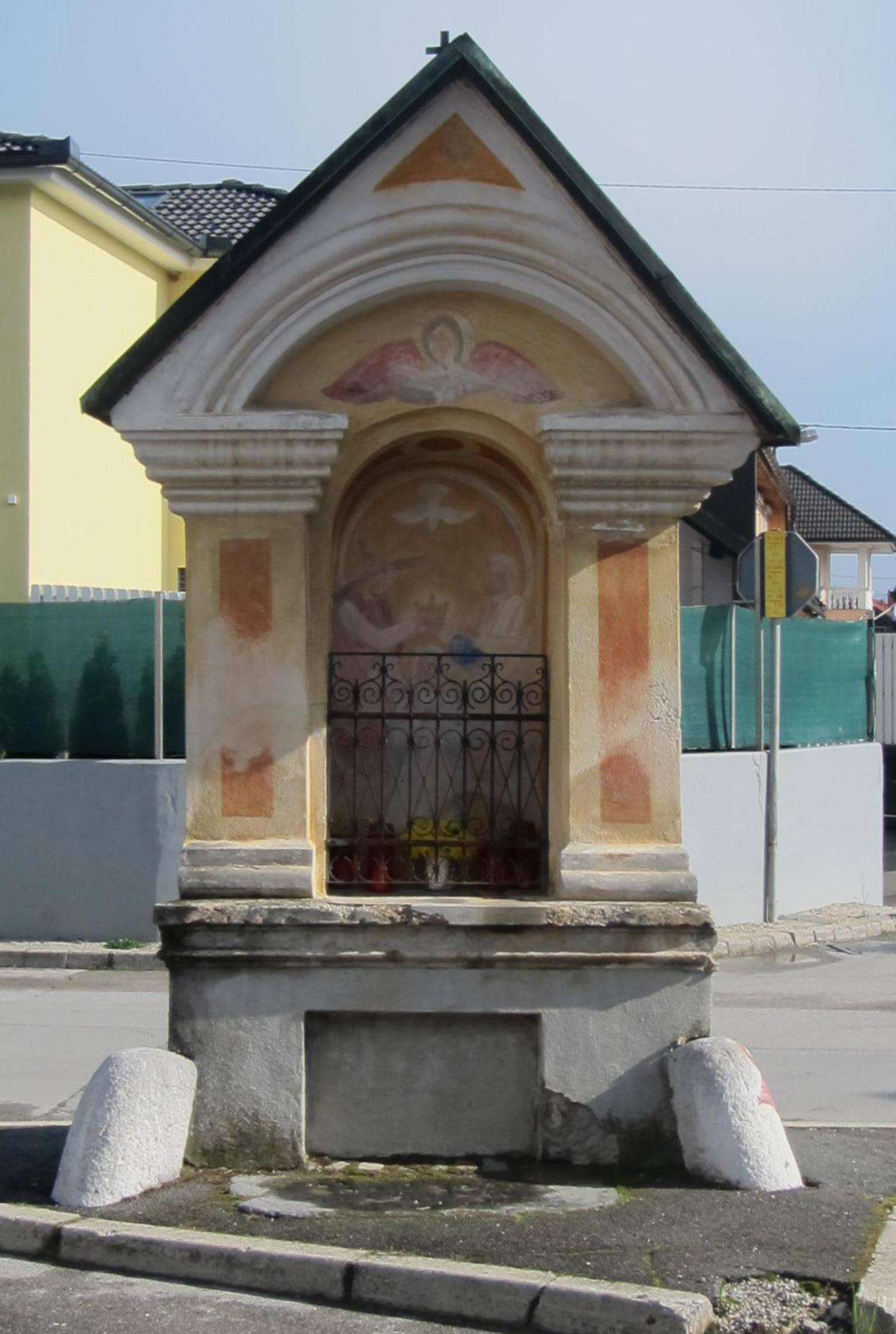
Chapel-shrine in the center of Gunclje

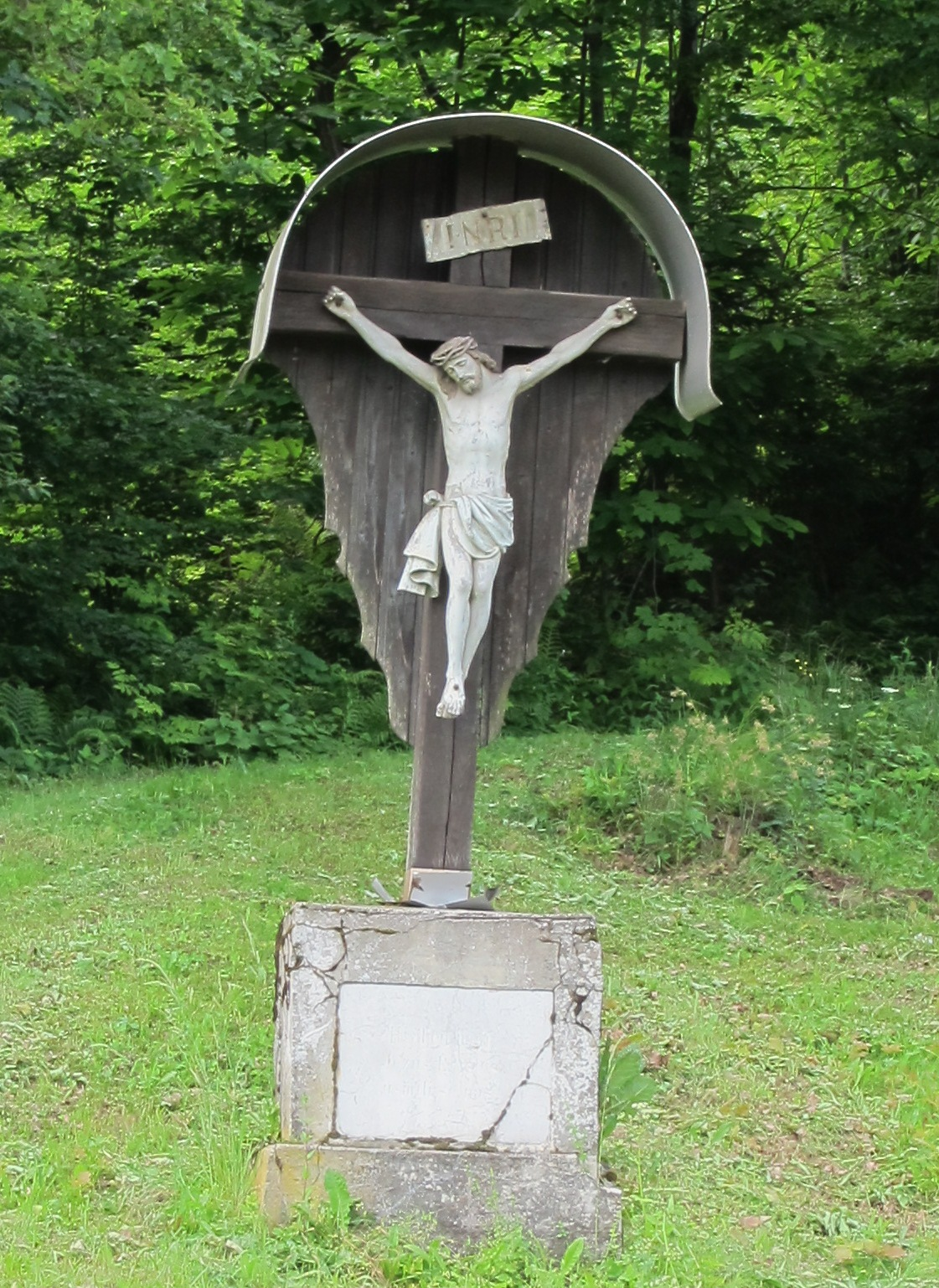
Crucifix shrine near the woods above Gunclje

== Notable people ==
Notable people that were born or lived in Gunclje include:

- Janez Bernik (1933–2016), painter
