= Dobračeva =

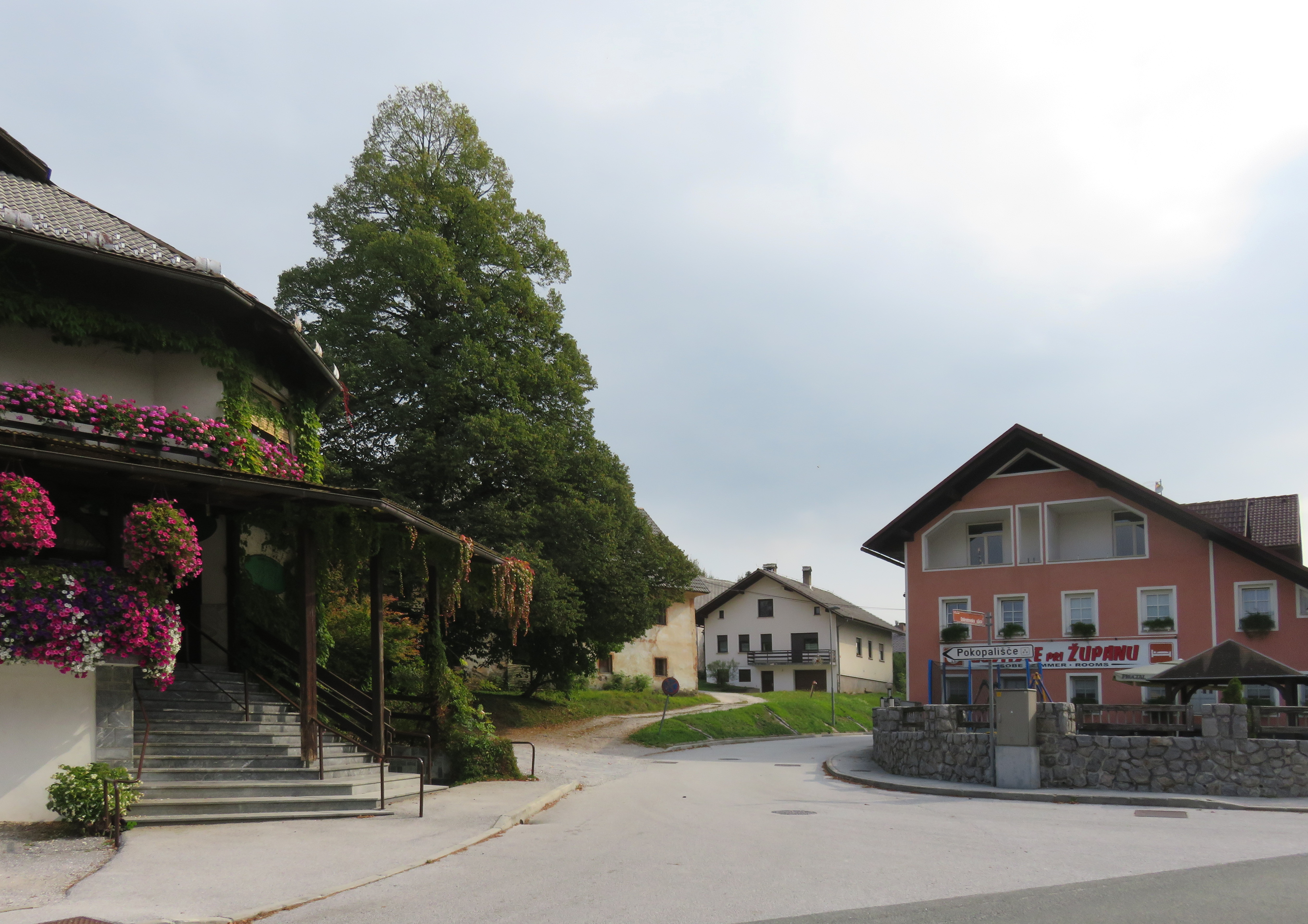

- Location in Slovenia
- Coordinates: 46°3′27″N 14°6′33″E
- Country: Slovenia
- Traditional region: Upper Carniola
- Statistical region: Upper Carniola
- Municipality: Žiri
- Elevation: 504 m (1,654 ft)

Dobračeva (pronounced [dɔˈbɾaːtʃɛʋa]; German: Dobratschewa) is a formerly independent settlement in the town of Žiri in western Slovenia. It is part of the traditional region of Upper Carniola and is now included with the rest of the municipality in the Upper Carniola Statistical Region. It includes the hamlets of Koče and Rakulk.

== Geography ==
Dobračeva is an elongated village at the northeast edge of the Žiri Plain (Slovene: Žirovsko polje) along the road between Žiri and Fužine. To the south, it transitions into the former settlement of Stara Vas. The hamlet of Koče lies southeast of the cemetery in Dobračeva, and the hamlet of Razkulk lies to the northeast along Razkulka Creek.

== History ==
Before the Second World War, there were an electricity plant, a sawmill, and a flour mill along Rakulka Creek. The prewar economy was mostly based on crafts and farming, with limited grain production and some animal husbandry. Other income came from the local inn and renting out rooms. During the war, Partisan forces engaged enemy troops in the area in August 1943. A roadside monument marks the place where the Prešeren Brigade was able to break through after several days of fighting at Žirovski Vrh. German forces attacked Žiri on 4 January 1944. Water mains were set up in the village in 1956, connected to the Rakulka catchment basin. Dobračeva was annexed by Žiri in 1981, ending its existence as an independent settlement.

== Church ==
The church in Dobračeva is dedicated to Saint Leonard. The church has a rectangular nave and an octagonal chancel walled on three sides, and dates from the 18th and 19th centuries. The Baroque altar dates from the 18th century and was probably created by the Facia workshop in Polhov Gradec. The pulpit is the work of Štefan Šubic (1820–1884).

== Cultural heritage ==
In addition to Saint Leonard's Church, several other structures in Dobračeva have protected cultural monument status:

- The building at Pot v Skale no. 10 in the hamlet of Koče, east of the church, is a two-story stone housebarn built against a slope. The door casing bears the year 1851. It has a symmetrical half-hip roof covered with flat concrete tiles.
- There is Partisan mass grave in the cemetery containing the remains of several dozen soldiers that fell in the German attack in 1944. It has a tall stone marker that was unveiled in 1953 and renovated in 1978.
- A double hayrack stands south of the house at Ledinica Street (Slovene: Cesta na Ledinico) no. 1. It has three stone columns and two wooden columns on each side, and a symmetrical gabled roof covered with concrete tiles. It dates from the first half of the 20th century.
- The double hayrack at the Župan farm (Slovene: Županov toplar), with seven stone pillars per side with intermediate wooden pillars, stands by the Župan farm at Loka Street (Slovene: Loška cesta) no. 78. It has a symmetrical gabled roof covered with flat concrete tiles. The gables are covered by boards arranged vertically.
- The horse engine at the Župan farm (Slovene: Županov gepelj) was formerly used to power a threshing machine. It is located next to the house at the Župan farm and is covered by a wooden canopy formed by a pyramid roof covered with concrete tiles.

== Notable people ==
Notable people that were born or lived in Dobračeva include:

- Janez Sedej (1910–1975), painter
- Maksim Sedej (1909–1974), painter
