= Lacemaker (Portrait of Štefka Batič) =

1923 painting by Veno Pilon

- Čipkarica (Portret Štefke Batičeve) (Slovene)
- Artist: Veno Pilon
- Year: 1923
- Medium: oil on canvas
- Dimensions: 103.5 cm × 77.5 cm (40.7 in × 30.5 in)
- Location: Museum of Modern Art (Ljubljana), Ljubljana

Lacemaker (Portrait of Štefka Batič) (in Slovenian: Čipkarica (Portret Štefke Batičeve)) is a painting by the Slovenian painter Veno Pilon from 1923.

== Description ==
The picture is painted in oil on canvas and has dimensions of 103.5 x 77.5 cm.

The picture is part of the collection of the Museum of Modern Art in Ljubljana.

== Analysis ==
The portrait presents Štefka Batič with lace, which is caught with the right hand on the top edge and the bottom adhere left hand. The painting is part of a series of portraits of Veno Pilon, he portrays friends, relatives and loved ones. With them he enters own new period, going from expressionism to a new reality. The colors are dark, unclear, and the overall feel of the image is static, even still. At the same time, his work marks a new emphasis on volume and with a clear purpose paints everyday life. His portraits express peace.

Lacemaker (Portrait of Štefka Batič) was selected by the Slovenian Ministry of Culture as one of the masterpieces of Slovenian art for the Europeana 280 campaign.
