= Tinca Stegovec =

Slovenian artist (1927–2019)

- Born: 8 April 1927; Planina pri Črnomlju, Yugoslavia (present-day Slovenia)
- Died: 14 January 2019 (aged 91)
- Education: Academy of Fine Arts in Ljubljana
- Known for: Printmaking, Wash drawing, Painting
- Notable work: The Call (1978) (most notable)
- Movement: Ljubljana Graphic School
- Awards: silver award in Paris for The Call

Tinca Stegovec (8 April 1927 – 14 January 2019) was a Slovenian artist, known mostly for her printmaking and painting, and associated with the group of artists internationally known as Ljubljana Graphic School.

== Life and work ==
She is described as "highly figurative artist and a subtle observer of the world around her and interpersonal relations". Critics wrote her works are "deep personal stories, characterized by a deliberate choice of subjects and carefully selected visual means". For health reasons however she abandoned printmaking after 1988 and devoted herself to drawing and painting. A large part of her life was also teaching, traveling, journalism and translating.

She donated her entire printmaking oeuvre together with matrices and four drawings, as well as a large portion of her professional library, to the International Centre of Graphic Arts Ljubljana.

== Exhibitions and awards ==
In 1954, she had her first solo exhibition of prints and wash drawings in Ljubljana’s Small Gallery (Mala galerija).

In 1963, she received a six-month scholarship to study in Paris and decided to take up intaglio (printmaking) with Professor Stanley William Hayter in his legendary Atelier 17 studio in Paris.

In 1966, she held her first solo exhibition abroad, followed by a busy exhibiting period during which she received the Prešeren Fund Award.

In 1985, her graphic art titled "The Call" ("Klic" in Slovenian), which she created in 1978, received a silver award in Paris.

Stegovec died on 14 January 2019, aged 91.
