= Veno Pilon =

Slovenian artist (1896–1970)

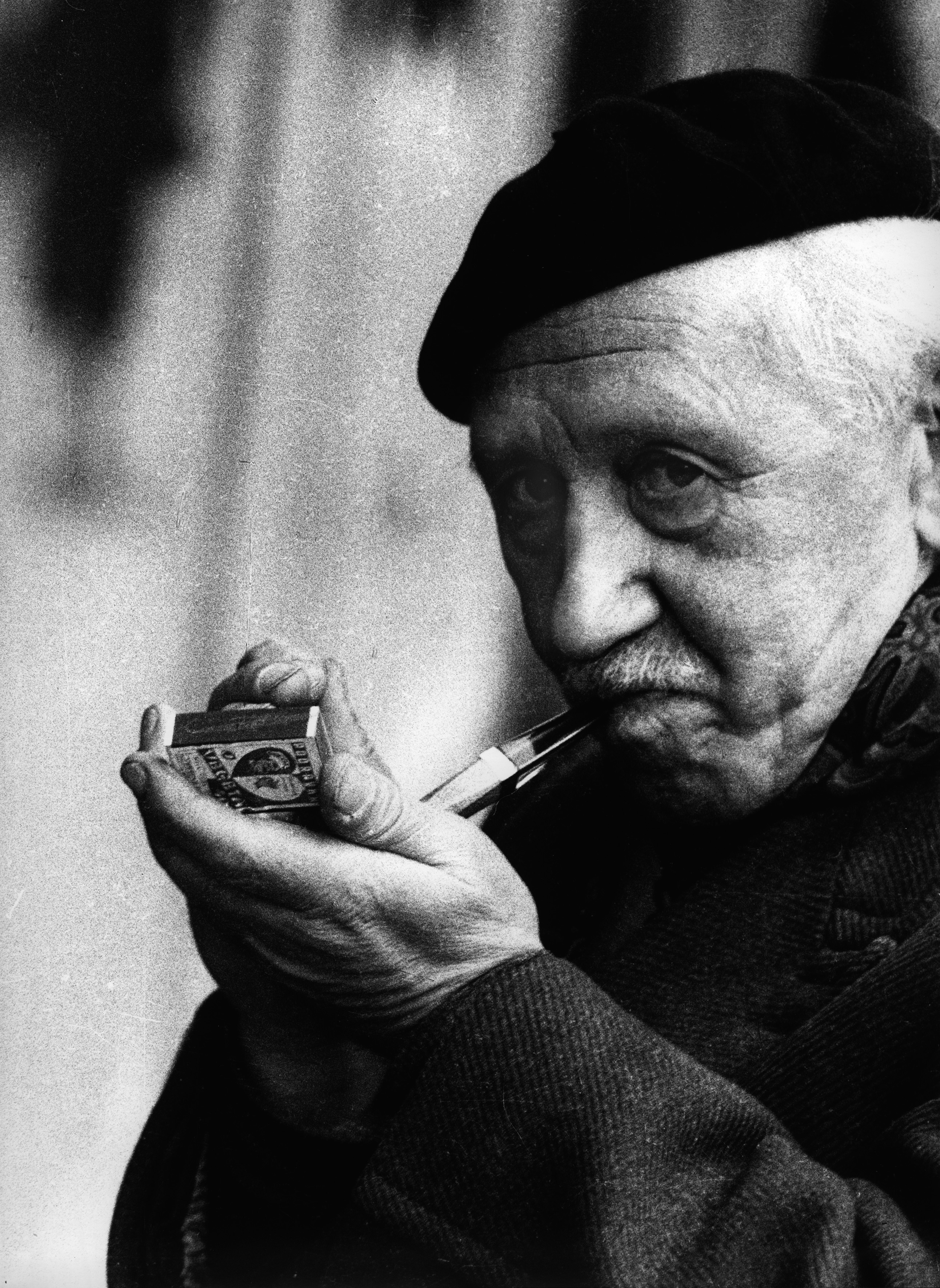
Veno Pilon, 1969

Veno Pilon (22 September 1896 – 23 September 1970) was a Slovene expressionist painter, graphic artist and photographer. He was born and died in Ajdovščina.

== Biography ==
Pilon was born in Ajdovščina, then part of the Austro-Hungarian province of Gorizia and Gradisca (now in Slovenia). After he had finished the Gorizia Grammar School, he was drafted by the Austro-Hungarian Army during World War I. He fought on the Eastern front and was captured by the Russian army. He later described his experience as a prisoner of war in the autobiography Na robu ("On the Edge"). He returned to Ajdovščina in 1919, where he took up painting and studied at the Academy of Fine Arts in Prague.

In the late 1920s Pilon moved to Paris, where he explored photography and translating Slovene literature into French. There he married a Frenchwoman Anne-Marie Guichard, an English teacher.

After a donation by his son, Dominique, his work is on permanent display at the Pilon Gallery in Ajdovščina.

== Notable works ==
- Lacemaker (Portrait of Štefka Batič), 1923.
