= Janez Bernik =

Slovenian painter (1933–2016)

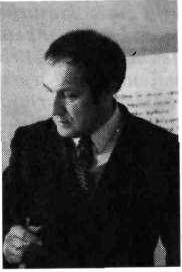
- Bernik in 1969
- Born: 6 September 1933; Gunclje, Yugoslavia
- Died: 15 July 2016 (aged 82); Prebold, Slovenia
- Known for: Graphic art, sculpture, set design, and poetry

Janez Bernik (6 September 1933 – 15 July 2016) was a multiple-time awarded and internationally acclaimed Slovenian painter and academic.

== Life ==
Bernik was born in the village of Gunclje, now part of Ljubljana. After finishing the Crafts School in Ljubljana, from 1951 until 1955, Bernik attended the Academy of Fine Arts in Ljubljana, where he was a pupil of Maksim Sedej. From 1956 to 1958, he continued his studies with the professors of graphic design Božidar Jakac and Riko Debenjak, and on a number of study travels (Italy, France...). From 1958 to 1969, he worked as a freelance artist, and in 1970 started teaching as a professor of drawing and painting at the Academy of Fine Arts in Ljubljana. From 1979 to 1996, when he retired, he was a full professor and the head of the Painting Department of the Academy. He was member of the Group 69 and participated at all its exhibitions. In 1989, he was named an associate member of the Slovenian Academy of Sciences and Arts, and in 1993 became its full member. He was an external corresponding member of Accademia di san Luca in Rome, and from 1996, a regular member of the European Academy of Sciences and Arts. He died in Prebold.

== Exhibitions and awards ==
Bernik was a versatile artist, who reached excellent results in painting, sculpture, graphic design, illustration, tapestry, book design, and poetry. His graphic prints are kept in numerous worldwide-known galleries and collections. He had over 60 independent exhibitions, including at the main galleries of the former Yugoslavia, Klagenfurt, Milan, Rome, Paris, Berlin, New York... Several times, he also participated at the Venice Biennale, as well as at a number of group exhibitions at home and abroad. He published four independent graphic folders. His poems were published in two collections; the first one in the monograph Lines ("Črte"), and the second one, Triptych ("Triptih"), in the catalogue 1985 Exhibition ("Razstava 1985") and the New Magazine ("Nova revija").

Of the domestic awards, of particular importance are the Prešeren Fund Award for painting and graphic design (1963), Jakopič Award for painting (1971), and Prešeren Award (1981). He also received a number of international honorary awards and golden medals for painting and graphic design. His works are kept by Slovenian galleries (Ljubljana, Maribor, Ajdovščina, and Idrija) and by galleries and museums in most of larger European cities (London, Vienna, Prague, Zagreb, Warsaw, Paris, Rome, Amsterdam). Many of his works are also kept in the Northern and Southern Americas (San Francisco, Washington, New York, Buenos Aires, Rio de Janeiro), and even Japan (Tokyo).
