= Maksim Sedej =

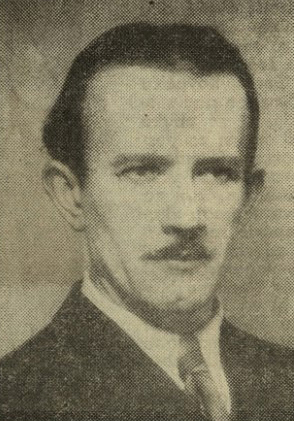
- Born: 26 May 1909; Dobračeva, Slovenia
- Died: 13 May 1974; Ljubljana, Slovenia
- Education: Academy of Fine Arts, Zagreb
- Known for: painting and illustrating
- Notable work: Painting and illustration
- Awards: Levstik Award; 1953 for Tisoč in ena noč Levstik Award; 1954 for Racko in Lija; Levstik Award; 1956 for Potovanje v tisočera mesta and Pastirček; Prešeren Award; 1967 for his paintings exhibited in the Museum of Modern Art in Ljubljana

Maksim Sedej (26 May 1909 – 13 May 1974) was a Slovene painter, one of the key figures of the mid-20th-century art scene in Slovenia.

Sedej was born in Dobračeva on the northern outskirts of Žiri in 1909. He studied art at the Zagreb Academy of Fine Arts between 1928 and 1932. His work was exhibited amid the selection of Yugoslav art at the Venice Biennale in 1940 and 1954. He worked as a professor at the Ljubljana Academy of Fine Arts and Design.

He received the Prešeren Award in 1967 for an exhibition of his work shown at the Ljubljana Museum of Modern Art in 1966.

He won the Levstik Award for his book illustrations three times: in 1953 for his illustrations for a 1953 edition of One Thousand and One Nights, in 1954 for his illustrations for Bogomir Magajna's collection of stories Racko in Lija (Racko and Lija) and in 1956 for Potovanje v tisočera mesta (Travels to Myriad Towns) by Vitomil Zupan and the traditional Istrian tale Pastirček (The Little Shepherd Boy).
