= Museum of Modern Art (Ljubljana) =

Coordinates: 46°3′11.51″N 14°29′55.68″E

- Moderna galerija
- Location: Ljubljana, Slovenia
- Type: Art museum
- Website: www.mg-lj.si/en/

The Museum of Modern Art (Slovene: Moderna galerija) in Ljubljana, Slovenia, is the central museum and gallery of Slovenian art from the 20th and 21st centuries.

== History ==
Established by decree of the government of the People's Republic of Slovenia on 30 December 1947, and officially opened to the public on 3 January 1948, it houses a permanent collection of 21st century Slovenian art as well as art from foreign artists. Its central building was designed by Edvard Ravnikar and was built in 1948. In addition, it acts as a place for: debate, documentation, education, research and study, increasing the presence of art for the wider public. The museum seeks to build a divergent model of museum, open the dialogue between institutes following similar priorities and those which are building new cultural production models.

On 26 November 2011, it was expanded with the Metelkova Museum of Contemporary Art, situated at Metelko Street (Slovene: Metelkova ulica).

== See also ==
- National Gallery of Slovenia
- Art of Slovenia
- List of art galleries in Slovenia
- Lacemaker (Portrait of Štefka Batič), part of the museum's permanent collection
