= Špelca Mladič =

Slovenian painter, teacher and writer

- Born: December 19, 1894; Vienna, Austria-Hungary
- Died: January 1981 (aged 86–87); Ljubljana, SR Slovenia, Yugoslavia
- Burial place: Žale Central Cemetery, Ljubljana
- Occupations: painter, teacher, designer

Eleonora Magdalena Mladič Tavčar, also known as Špelca Mladič, (19 December 1894 – January 1981) was a Slovenian painter, teacher, and writer.

== Early life and education ==
She was born on 19 December 1894 in Vienna into a prosperous Slovenian family. Her mother was Gizela Mayer and her father was Janez Mladič. After completing primary school, she enrolled in a teacher-training college. Upon graduating, she studied painting for several years under the academic painter Viktor Olbrich (1887–1960). Her training focused primarily on watercolor painting, but also included various applied and decorative arts.

== Career ==
In 1920, due to political changes, she was forced to leave Vienna. She relocated to Maribor, where she was employed at the Women’s Vocational School Vesna as a teacher of decorative drawing and theoretical subjects. She worked there for at least nine years and later became head of the design drawing department. Alongside Milka Martelanc , she was for over a decade the most active contributor to the fashion supplement of Ženski svet (Women's World), the first fashion supplement in what is now Slovenia. She also authored professional and theoretical articles for the magazine. During the 1920s, she devoted considerable attention to Slavic national ornamentation. She designed and produced ceremonial banners for various associations, including those in Slovenska Bistrica, Kreka (Bosnia), Užice, Villach, and Teslić. She traveled throughout Yugoslavia and Czechoslovakia, where she studied and collected folk motifs, which she particularly incorporated into her banner designs. She also designed and illustrated book covers.

== Exhibitions ==
She was a member and co-founder of the Grohar Art Club, whose members included painter Henrika Šantel, general and poet Rudolf Maister, teacher, painter and printmaker Avgusta Šantel, Czech painter Ludmila Kleinmondová, and sculptor and printmaker Nikolaj Pirnat. With the club, she exhibited watercolor and tempera paintings. In 1921, she also participated with them in the First Art Exhibition in Maribor. She exhibited works at the Women's Vocational School Vesna and at the Maribor craft exhibition, where she presented paintings on silk ribbons, linocuts, and ornamented vases, receiving significant praise in the press. She also exhibited at the large regional exhibition Ljubljana in Autumn in Ljubljana. She also collaborated with the Little Women's Entente, exhibiting with the group in Belgrade.

== Later life and death ==
After 1931, she and her husband, civil servant and politician Ivan Tavčar (1891–1971), whom she married on 25 July 1927 in Ljubljana, withdrew from public life. (Note: They are no longer mentioned in newspapers, magazines, or other publications after 1931, despite both having been frequently referenced prior to that year.) This withdrawal may have been related to changing political circumstances in Yugoslavia. Her husband died in 1971. Špelca Mladič died in January 1981 and was buried at Žale Central Cemetery in Ljubljana.
