= Danica Šantel =

Slovenian teacher, amateur artist and art model (1887–1921)

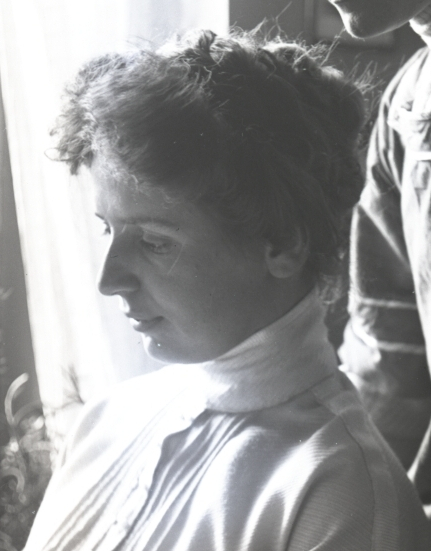
- Danica Šantel around 1910
- Born: 1887; Gorizia, Austria-Hungary
- Died: May 1921 (aged 33–34); Krško, Kingdom of Serbs, Croats and Slovenes
- Occupations: teacher, amateur artist, artists' model
- Parent: Avgusta von Aigentler (Avgusta Aigentler Šantel) (mother)
- Relatives: Henrika Šantel (sister); Avgusta Šantel (sister); Saša Šantel (brother)

Danica Šantel (1887 – 17 May 1921) was a Slovenian teacher, amateur artist and artist's model. She was part of the prominent family of artists and educators from Gorizia. She appears in lots of artworks by her mother or siblings.

== Early life ==
Danica Šantel was born in 1887 in Gorizia into a nationally conscious Slovenian family.

Her mother, Avgusta von Aigentler (1852–1935), also known as Avgusta Aigentler Šantel, was a painter and later a painting teacher at the Girls' High School in Gorizia, Her father, Anton Šantel (1845–1920), was a teacher of mathematics and physics at the Gorizia high school.

She was the youngest of seven children, four of whom reached adulthood: painter Henrika Šantel (1874–1940), painter, teacher and printmaker Avgusta Šantel (1876–1968), and painter and composer Saša Šantel (1883–1945) and her. Her first drawing teacher was her mother.

== Career ==
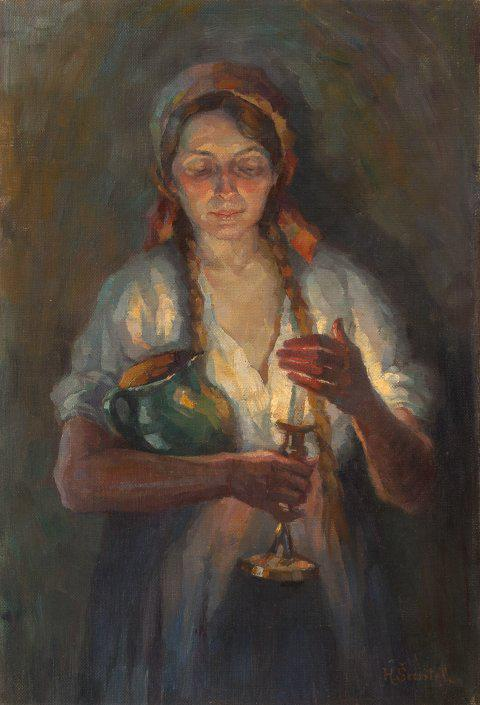
Henrika Šantel – Portrait of Sister Danica (c. 1912) (the painting is in the Gorizia Museum Kromberk.)

After completing primary school, in 1902 she began attending the teacher training college.

There, in 1906, she graduated as a teacher for elementary schools with Slovenian and German as the languages of instruction. That same year, she took a position as a teacher at an elementary school in Gorizia, where she worked for two years. In 1908, she passed the exam to teach handicrafts in elementary and middle schools. That same year, together with her sister Avgusta, she attended a summer landscape course with the Austrian painter Margarete Stall. Upon returning to Gorizia, she was employed as a teacher of decorative drawing at the women’s vocational school in Gorizia, where she worked for seven years, until 1915, when she had to resign due to illness. She also engaged in music. She was a Slovenian patriot and active in the cultural life of Gorizia.

She frequently posed for her mother, her sister Henrika, and her brother Saša, and she also painted herself.

Some of her works were exhibited between 1970 and 1971 at the exhibition Painters Šantel (Slikarji Šantli) in the Gorizia Museum Nova Gorica - Kromberk, Gallery of Littoral Artists, together with works of her family members.

== Illness and death ==
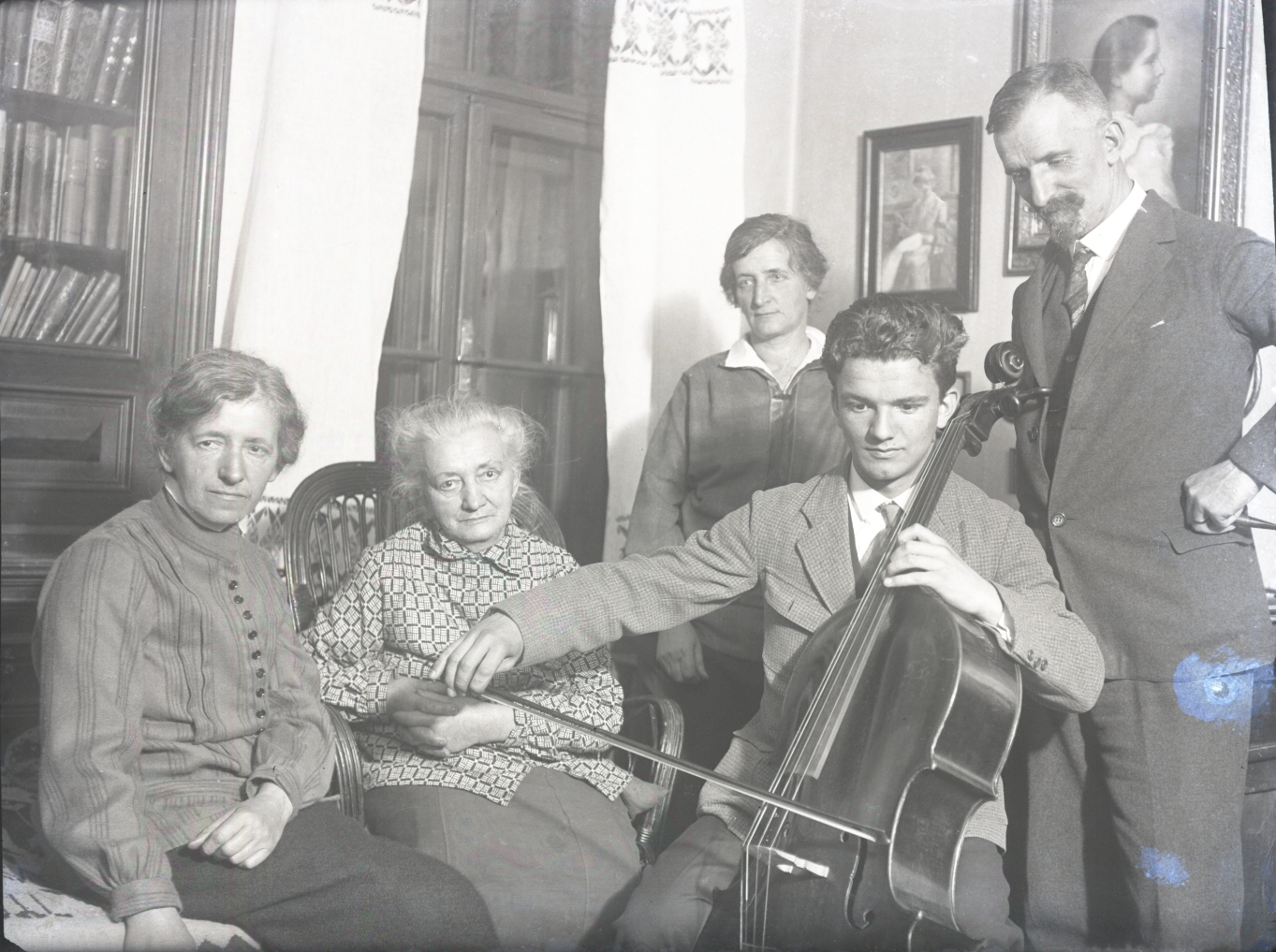
Her mother, sisters Henrika and Avgusta, brother Saša and nephew, around 1925. On the wall is a portrait of the late Danica, painted by her mother.

At a young age, she contracted tuberculosis. In 1914 the World War I broke out, heavily affecting the Gorizia region. In June 1915, because of continuous Italian attacks, her family decided to leave Gorizia. They delayed their departure from day to day, waiting for her sister Avgusta, who was coming from Pula, where she was employed as a teacher with the naval forces, as they wished to leave Gorizia together. At the end of June, believing they would return by October, she and her family left Gorizia. They first went to Ljubljana, where they stayed for eight days, and then settled in Dolenjske Toplice. Her illness worsened, and after four months the family left Dolenjske Toplice for Vienna. Her mother’s sister, the mathematician Henrietta von Aigentler, who with her late husband, famous physicist Ludwig Boltzmann, had often housed her nieces in 1900s, arranged for Danica to be admitted, on 2 November, to a sanatorium for lung diseases in Alland. In early 1916 her mother, father, and sisters moved to a rented house in the village of Groisbach near the sanatorium, so they could be closer to her. Despite various treatments, her condition did not improve. After several months she was discharged from sanatorium.

Before the end of March 1917 she moved with her parents and sister Henrika to Krško, where her parents had purchased a villa with an orchard. There she again found acquaintances, as many refugees from Gorizia were living in Krško. Her brother Saša also lived nearby with his family. In Krško, Danica and Henrika resumed painting. Soon, however, the family again lost their home when the villa burned down on 23 February 1918. They remained in Krško as tenants until the end of the war. Her father died in 1920. After the war her health declined steadily. She was cared for by her mother and sister Henrika, with whom she shared a rented apartment. She died on 17 May 1921 in Krško.

== In her mother’s art ==
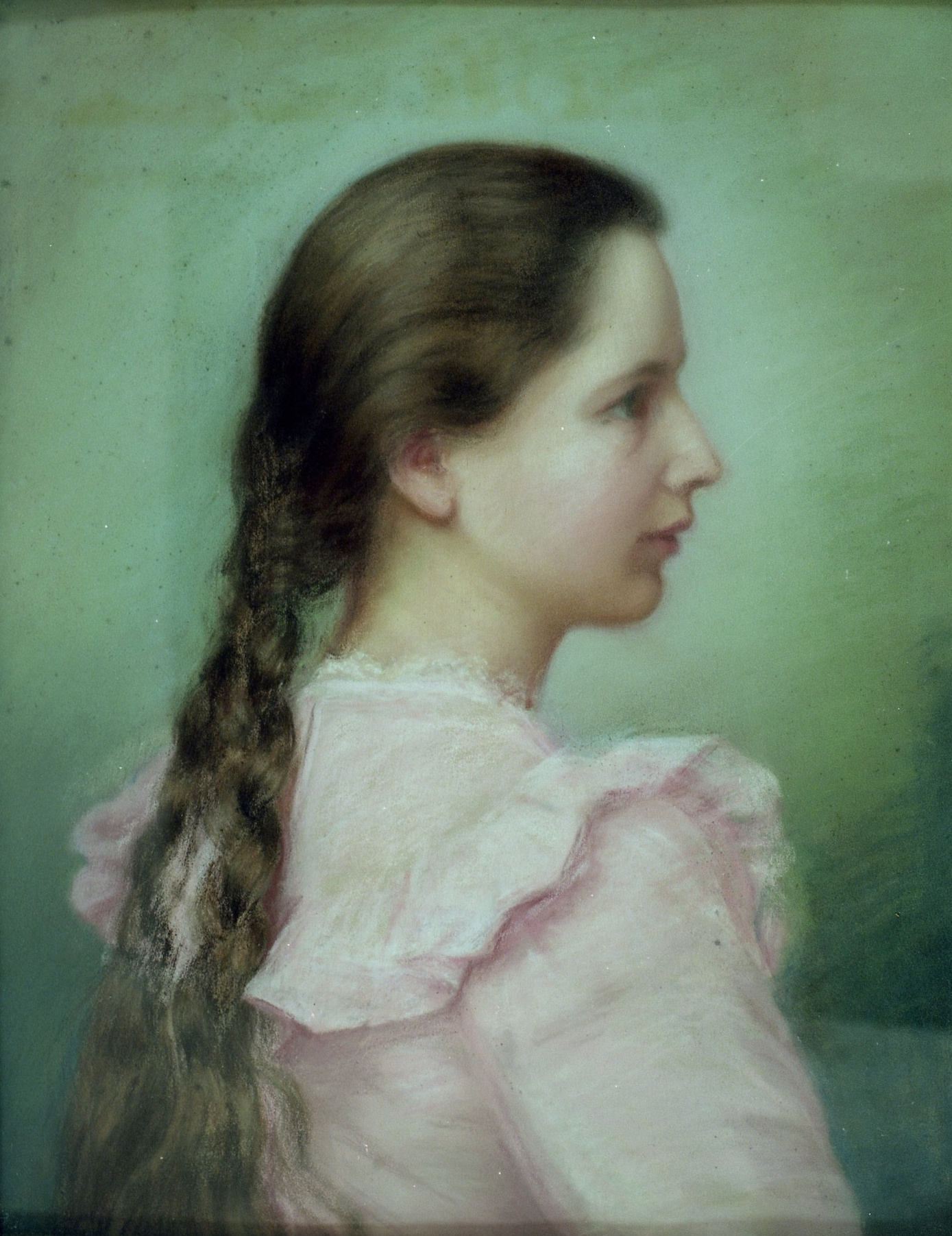
Portrait of Danica Šantel (1900)

Danica was portrayed by her mother at least once more in the drawing:

- Daughter Danica (ca. 1905, black chalk on paper) (Danica is depicted with her hair tied in a bun and wearing a necklace with a heart-shaped pendant around her neck.)

== In her sister Henrika’s art ==
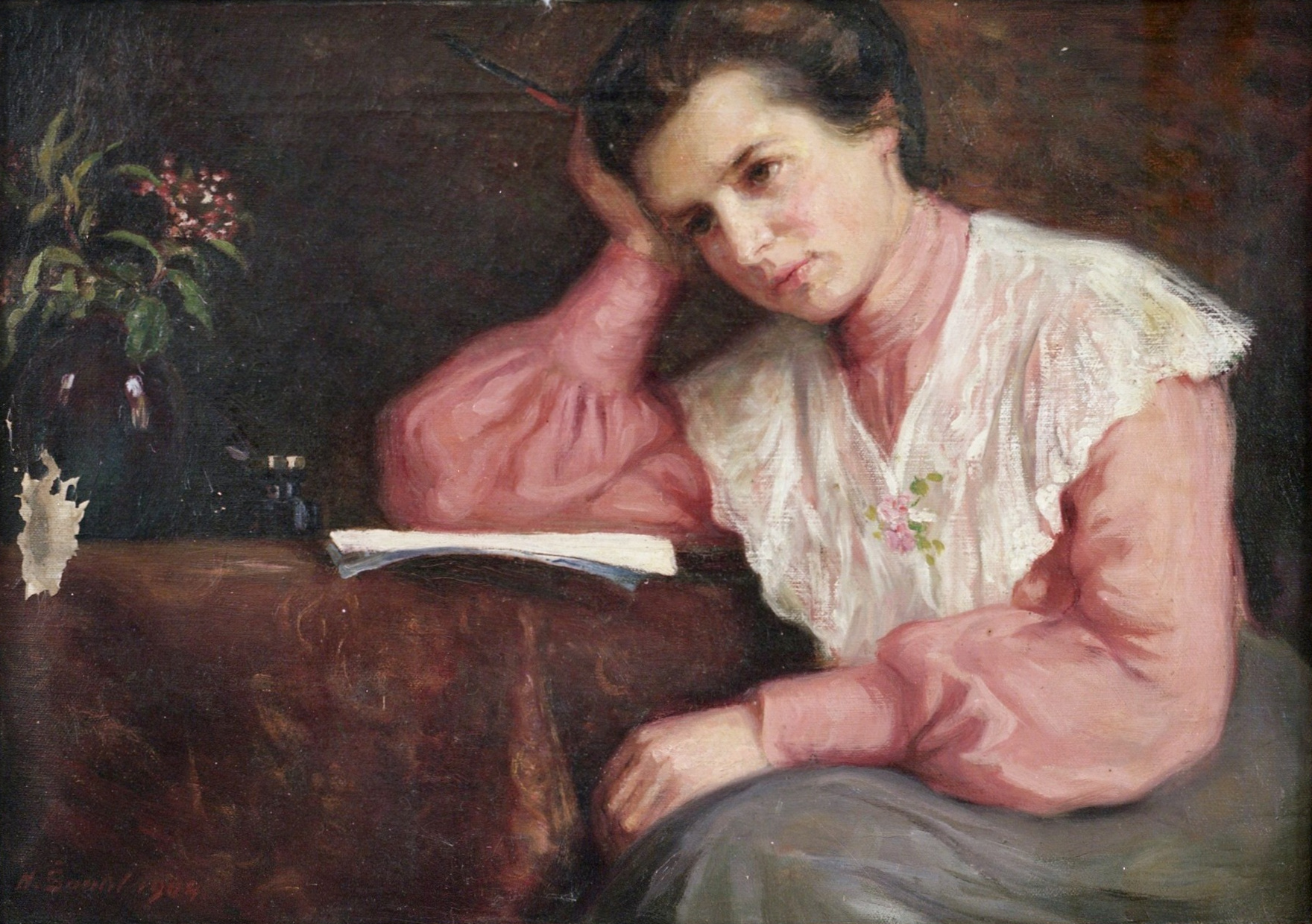
Sister Danica (1904)

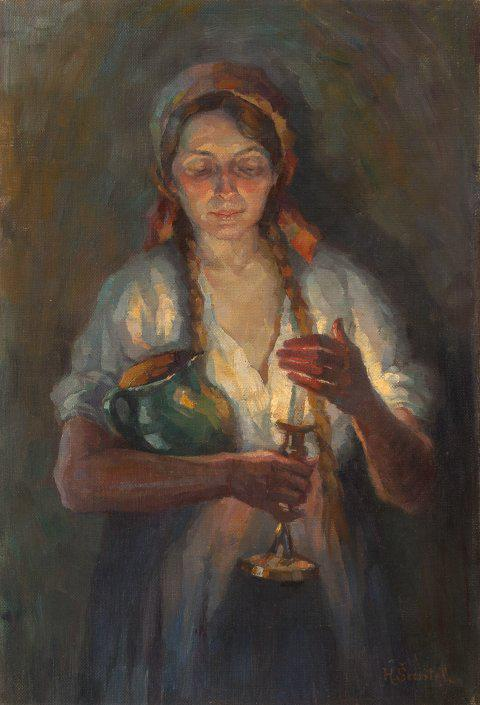
Portrait of Sister Danica (c. 1912) (the painting is in the Gorizia Museum Kromberk)

Henrika Šantel portrayed her sister Danica at least four more times:

- Sisters Avgusta and Danica with the dog Misili (1906, oil on canvas) – The sisters are depicted seated and sewing; Danica is wearing a red dress. The painting is held by the Slovene Ethnographic Museum.
- Sister Danica (1915, watercolor) (In the painting, Danica is sitting at a table with flowers. She is wearing a pink dress and has a violet shawl draped over her.)
- Sister Danica (1917, miniature)
- (posthumous) Portrait of Sister Danica (1925, watercolor)

== In her brother Saša’s work ==
=== Photography ===
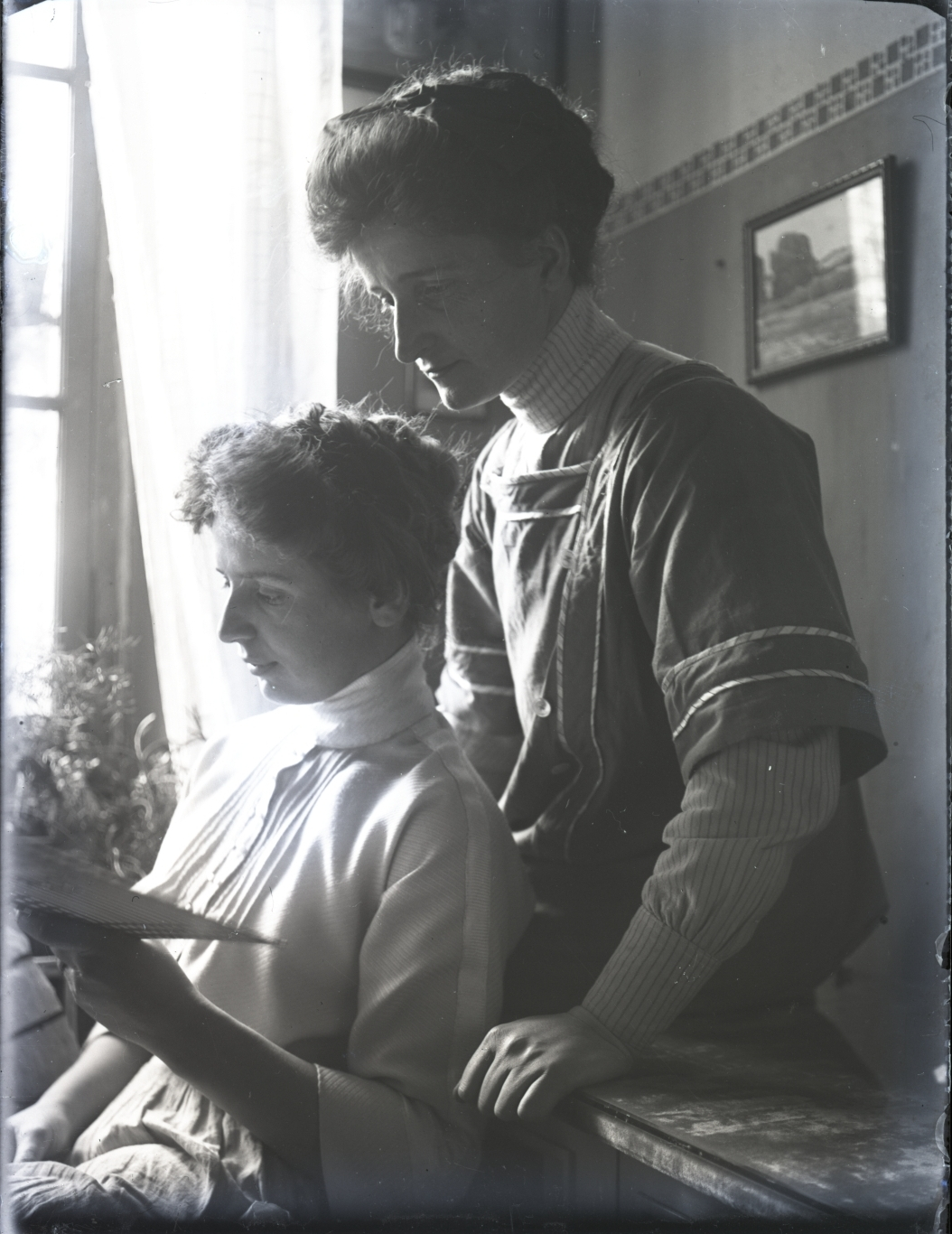
Danica (left) with sister Avgusta, around 1910

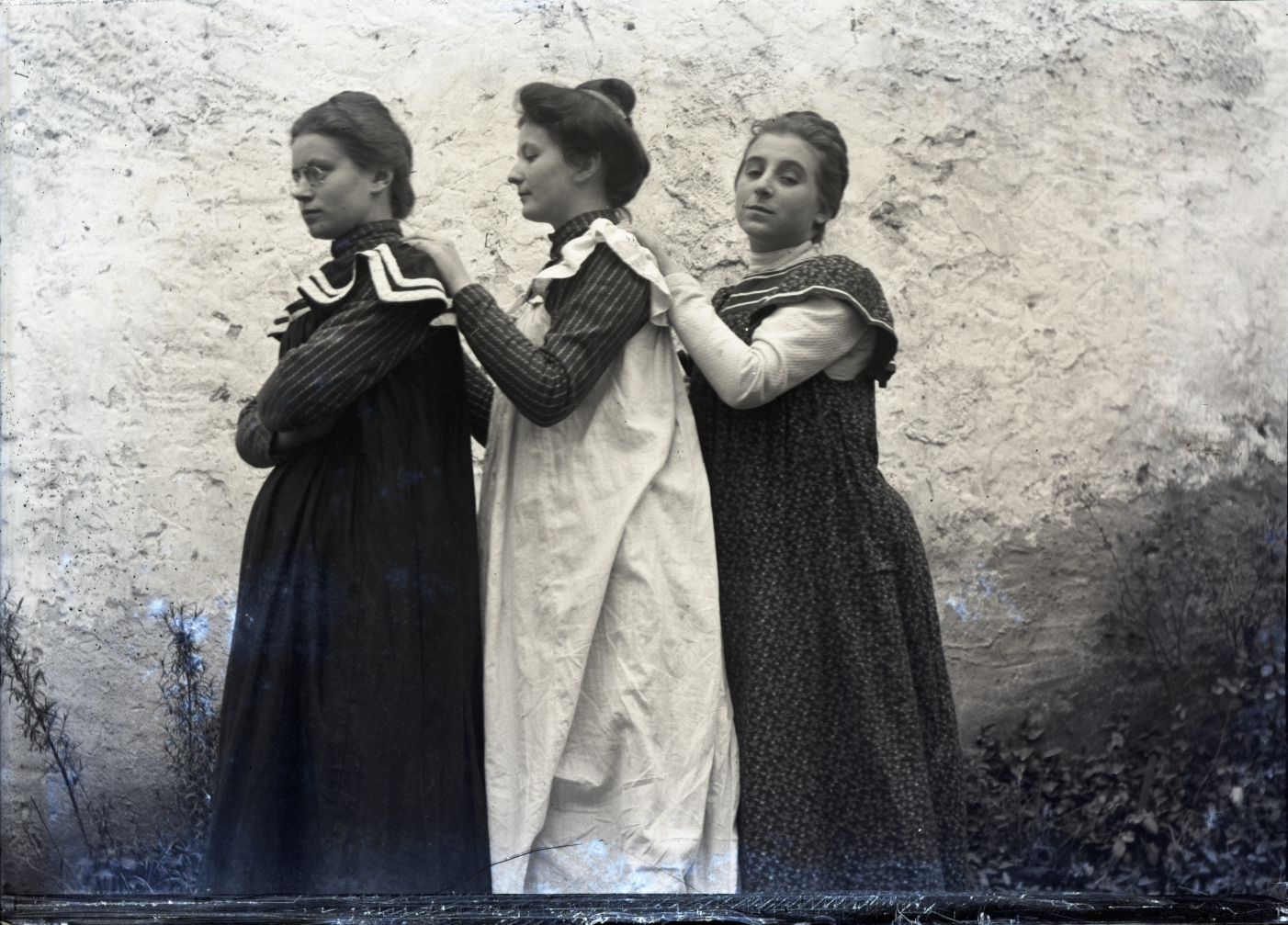
Danica (center) with friends, 1910

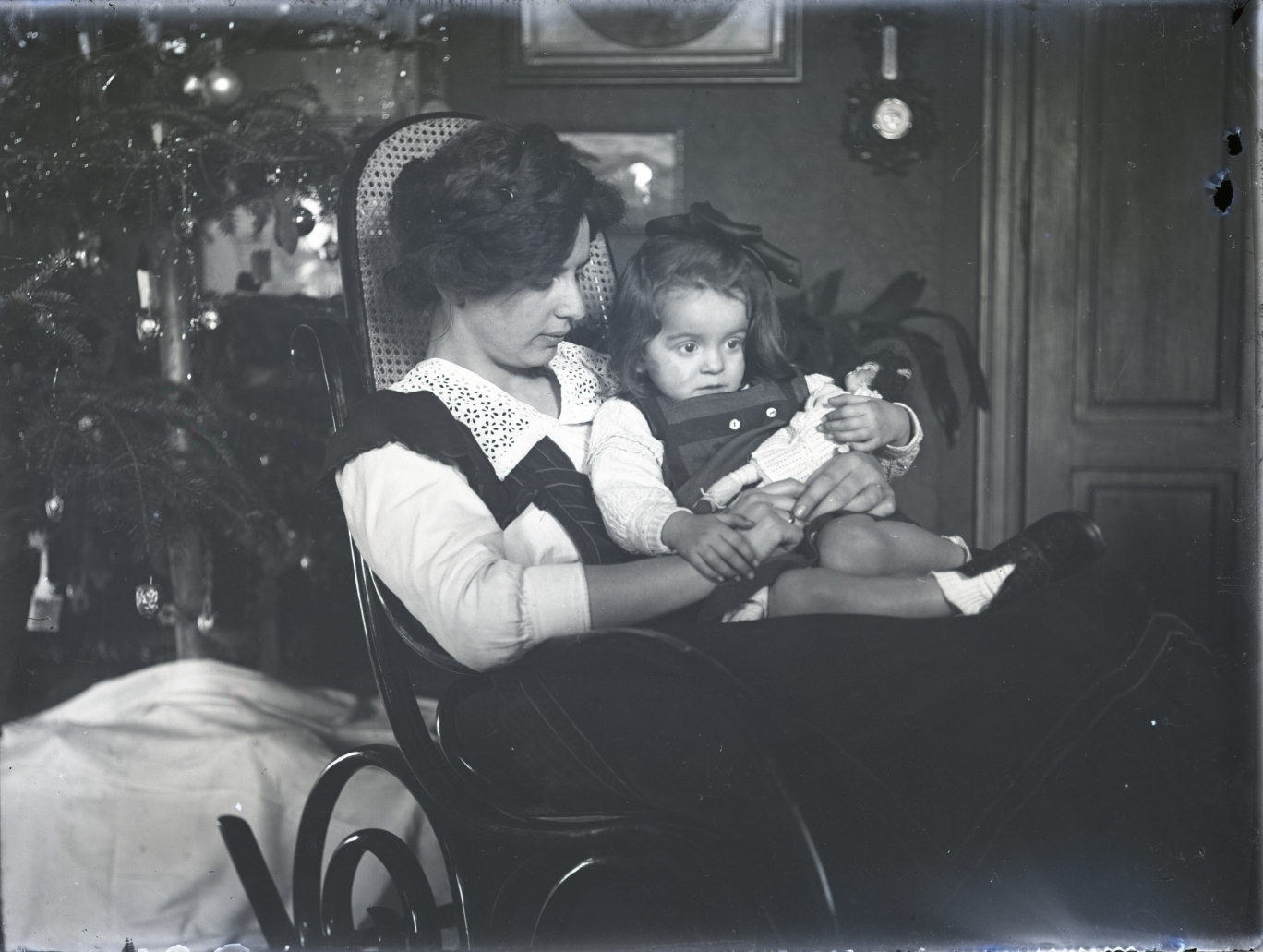
Danica with her niece, future civil engineer Voja Šantel, Christmas 1910
