= Pirnat =

Pirnat is a surname from Slovenia. People with the surname include:

- Makso Pirnat (1875–1933), Slavic scholar, father of Nikolaj Pirnat
- Nikolaj Pirnat (1903–1948), Slovenian painter, sculptor, draftsman and illustrator
- Nina Pirnat, former director of the Slovenian National Institute of Public Health - see COVID-19 pandemic in Slovenia
- Rajko Pirnat (born 1951), Slovenian lawyer, politician and university professor
- Stanko Pirnat (1859–1899), Slovenian composer and lawyer
