= Avgusta Šantel =

Slovenian painter, teacher and printmaker (1876–1968)

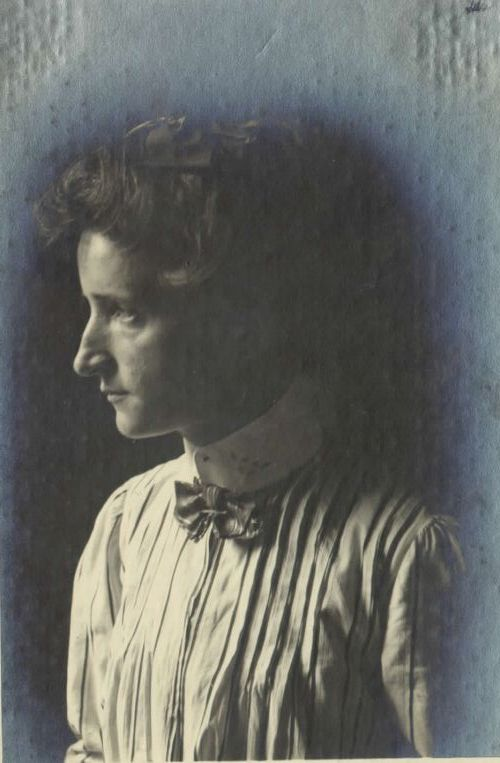
- Avgusta Šantel around 1900
- Born: Avgusta Šantel; 21 July 1876; Gorizia
- Died: 2 December 1968 (aged 92); Ljubljana
- Occupations: Painter, teacher, printmaker,violinist, drafter
- Parent(s): Avgusta von Aigentler (Avgusta Aigentler Šantel) (mother); Anton Šantel (father)
- Relatives: Henrika Šantel (sister) Saša Šantel (brother) Danica Šantel (sister)

Avgusta Šantel (21 July 1876 – 2 December 1968) was a Slovenian painter, teacher and printmaker. She created the first Slovenian artistic postcard for print.

== Early life ==
Avgusta Šantel was born on 21 July 1876 in Gorizia into a nationally conscious Slovene family. Her mother, Avgusta von Aigentler (1852–1935), also known as Avgusta Aigentler Šantel, was a painter, whose portraits were very popular in Gorizia at the time, and later a painting teacher at the Girls' High School in Gorizia, and her father was Anton Šantel (1845–1920), a high-school teacher of mathematics and physics in Gorizia. She had six siblings, three of whom survived to adulthood: Henrika Šantel (1874–1940), a painter; Saša Šantel (1883–1945), a painter and composer; and Danica Šantel (1887–1920), a teacher and amateur painter. Avgusta Šantel's first drawing teacher was her mother. In her memoirs she later wrote that as a child she would spend hours studying pictures with interest, trying to remember likenesses and imagining how to redraw them. From 1882 to 1890 she attended primary school in Gorizia, and at the end of primary school she also began taking violin lessons. In 1891 she entered the teacher-training college, graduating in 1895.

== Further education and teaching ==
In 1896 she got a job as a teacher at the first Slovenian school in Gorizia, and in 1897 she was also employed at a private Slovene school in the city. In 1898 she passed the examination to teach at middle schools. In 1900 she spent a semester in Vienna at the Kunstschule für Frauen und Mädchen, where her professor was the Austrian painter Tina Blau. During this time she lived with her mother's sister, the mathematician Henrietta von Aigentler, and her husband, the physicist Ludwig Boltzmann. There she met the architect Ivan Jager, who encouraged her to create a postcard for print, after he heard from her that in the summer of 1898, while on holiday with her mother, she had already been making unique lithographic postcards and sending them to her sister Henrika in Munich, where the latter was studying. Avgusta Šantel drew an Easter card; by April before Easter 1900 the first printed copy had already arrived in Vienna, bearing her printed name. This is considered the first Slovene artistic postcard. After returning from Vienna, in 1901 she taught for a year in Vransko. In 1902 she moved to Slovenska Bistrica, where she taught for two years.

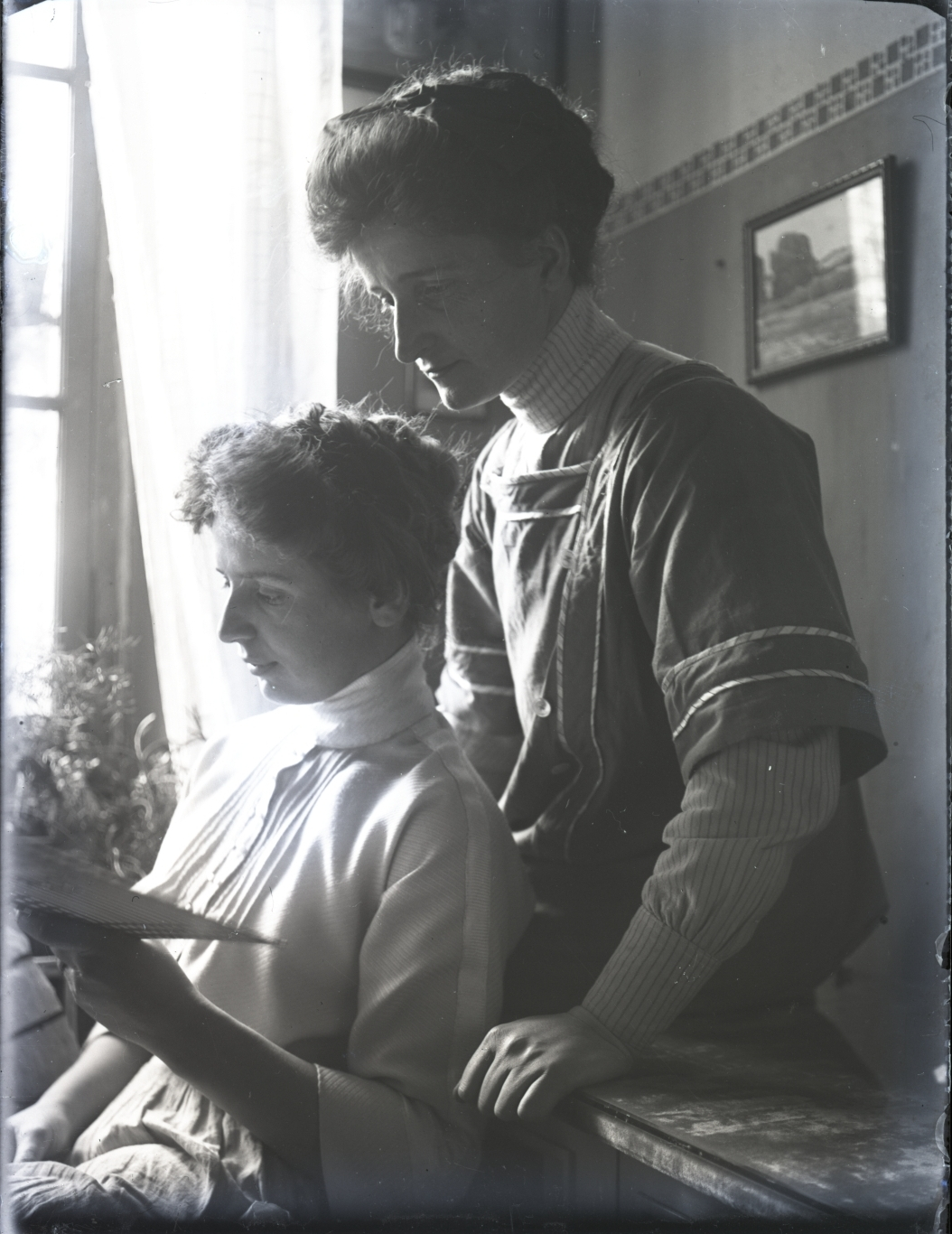
Avgusta Šantel (right) with her sister Danica, c. 1910

In 1904 she moved to Pula, where she worked at the Marinenschule, a girls' primary and middle school for the children of naval personnel, and, apart from short interruptions, remained there for fourteen years. In 1907 and 1908 she studied in Munich at a school of applied and fine arts; she attended an evening life-drawing course with the German painter Wilhelm von Debschitz and refined her flower still-life painting at the private school of the Austrian painter Margarete Stall. In 1908 and 1909 she took part in summer painting courses run by Munich schools in Tyrol and Bavaria. In 1909 she passed the exam that allowed her to teach the violin in schools. She later taught the violin and performed in several musical ensembles for years. During the First World War she left Pula and found refuge with a friend in Lower Carniola, later returning to the city. In 1916 and 1917 she taught in the Steinklam refugee camp. In 1920 she took a position as a teacher of drawing and singing in Sušak. In 1922 she was employed at the girls' middle school in Maribor, later the Ivan Cankar Primary School, where she worked for twelve years. There she was also very active in music, playing the violin and working with the Maribor branch of the Slovenian music society Glasbena matica. In 1923, after the deaths of her father and her sister Danica, her mother and sister Henrika moved in with her. In 1929 her mother and sister moved to Ljubljana. Avgusta Šantel retired in 1933.

== Artistic work and style ==
She worked in oil, watercolor, pastel, and colored pencil; she also tried woodcut and linocut. She drew lace patterns as well. Her subjects were mainly landscapes and views of the places where she lived, and flower still lifes; portraits and figure compositions are less common. Her woodcuts mostly depict landscapes. Her works show features of plein-air painting, realist traits, and careful color harmony. Compared with her oils, her prints move away from strict realism, with stronger light–dark contrasts and more dynamic forms that create a slightly romantic mood. Some of her works, especially the woodcuts, have an awakening national character.

She was a member of the Vesna art club, whose members included her sister Henrika, her brother Saša, her future sister-in-law, the artistic embroiderer Ruža Sever Šantel, the painter Maksim Gaspari, the sculptor Svitoslav Peruzzi, the painter Melita Rojc, the illustrator Hinko Smrekar, and the Croatian sculptor Ivan Meštrović. With Vesna she exhibited at the 1st Yugoslav Art Exhibition in 1904 in Belgrade.

In Maribor she became a member of the Grohar art club, whose members included the painter Viktor Cotič, the general and poet Rudolf Maister, her sister Henrika, the painter, teacher, and writer Špelca Mladič, Chezh painter Ludmila Kleinmondová and the sculptor and printmaker Nikolaj Pirnat. With the club she appeared at the 5th Yugoslav Art Exhibition in Belgrade in 1922 and at an exhibition of Slovene artists in Hodonín (now in the Czech Republic) in 1924.

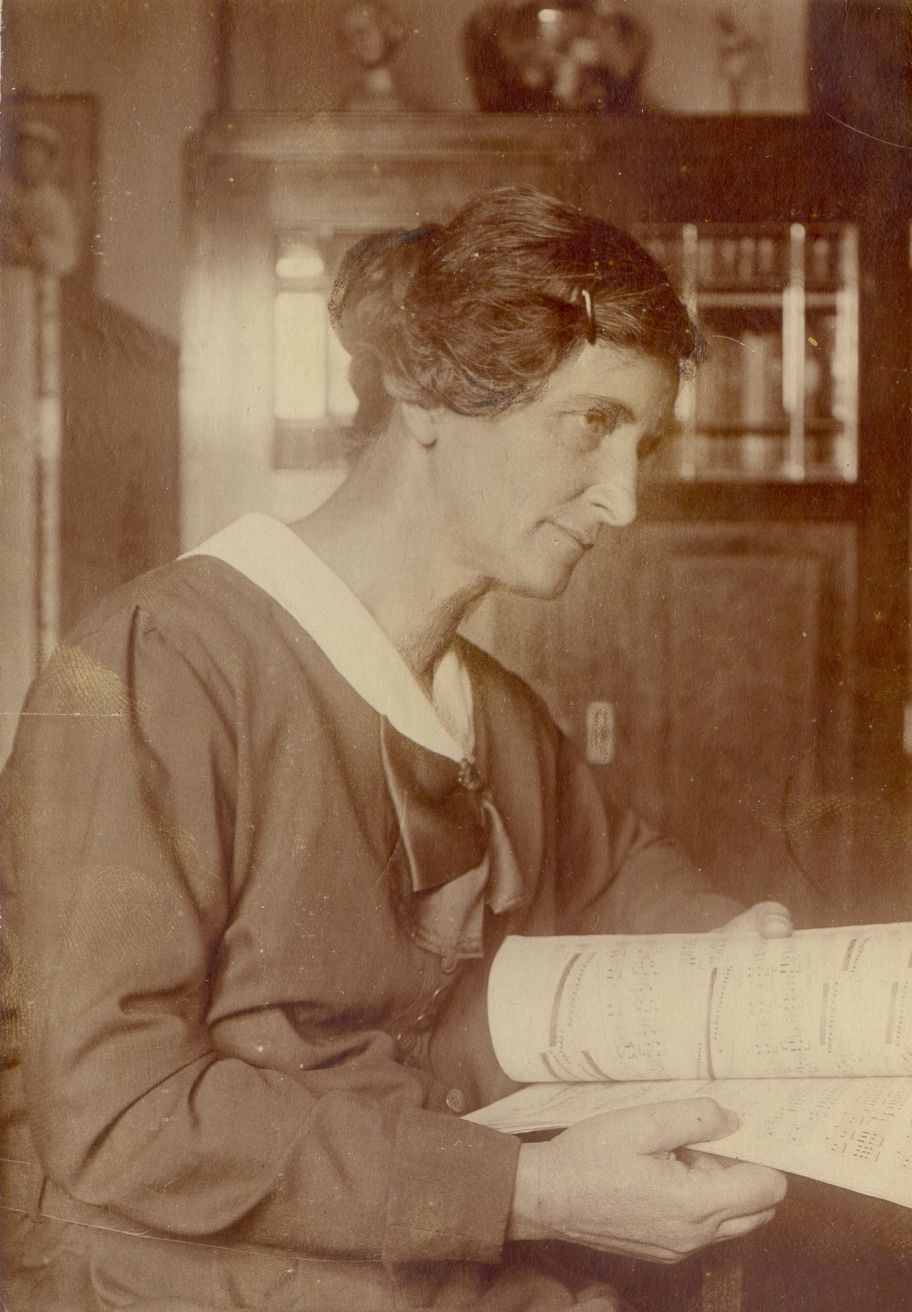
Avgusta Šantel around 1920

By 1966 she had recorded 739 sold or donated works in her personal ledger; her actual output was higher, as the ledger did not include woodcuts and linocuts. In her diary she wrote that painting outdoors in Pula, where she lived for a time, was discouraged, so she set up a studio at home. She paid particular attention to the precise depiction of vegetation, aided by her own herbarium. Her works are held by her relatives, the National Gallery of Slovenia, the Maribor Art Gallery, and numerous private collections.

== Exhibitions ==
She first exhibited her works in a group show in 1900 in Ljubljana. She held only two solo exhibitions, but took part in many group shows in Ljubljana, Gorizia, Bled, Maribor, Celje, Osijek, Novi Sad, Čačak, Hodonín, Pazin, Trieste, Dubrovnik, Zagreb, Belgrade, Munich, and elsewhere. She often exhibited with the Slovene Association of Fine Artists, the Grohar club, the Association of Yugoslav Sisters (Kolo jugoslovanskih sester), the Lada club, the Vesna club, and the Association of Graphic Artists of Yugoslavia, of which she was a member. With the Women's Little Entente (Ženska mala atanta) she exhibited across Yugoslavia, Czechoslovakia, and Romania.

== Memoirs ==
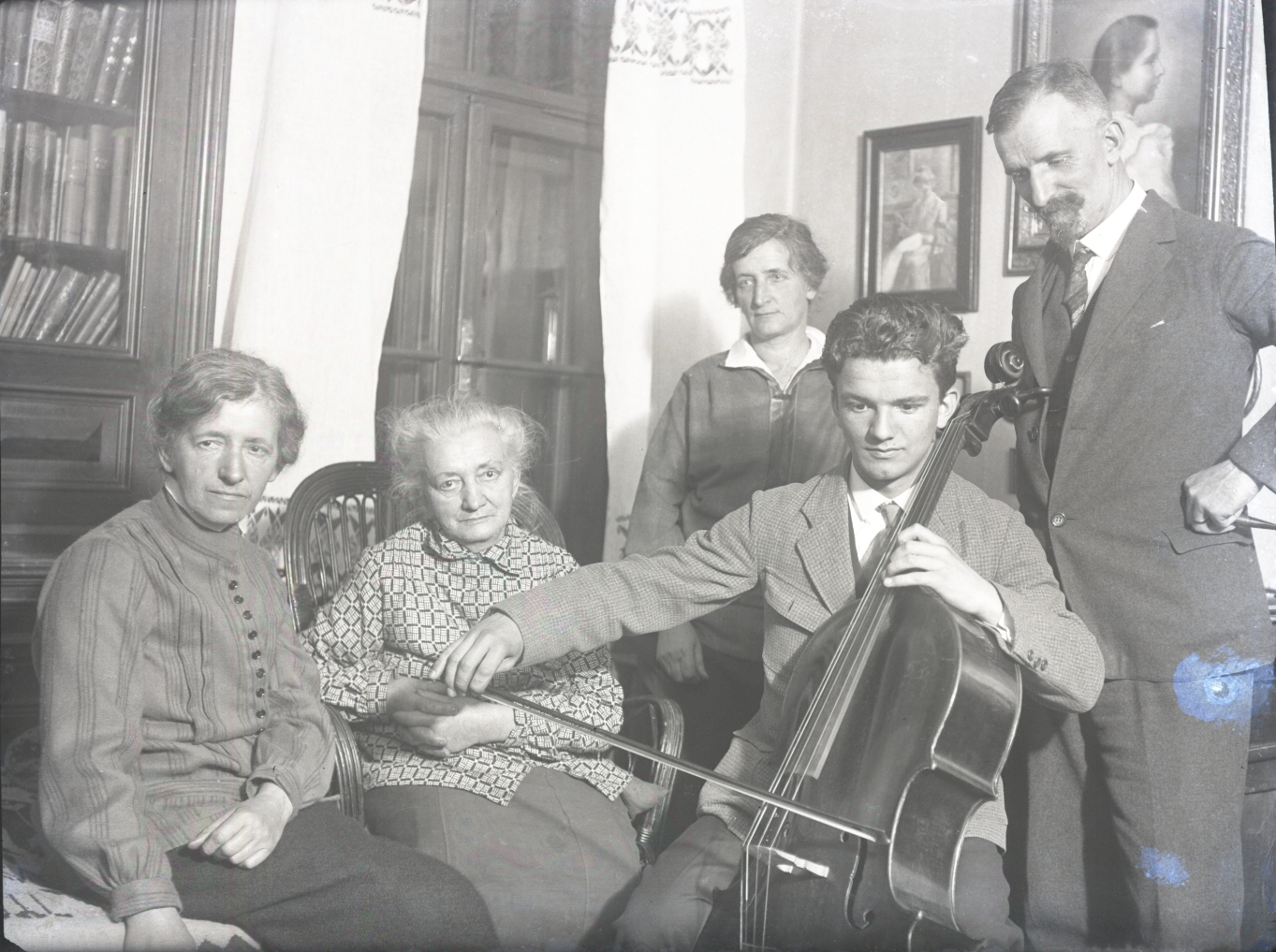
Avgusta Šantel (third from left) with her mother, sister Henrika, brother Saša, and nephew, c. 1925. On the wall is a framed portrait of her late sister Danica, painted by their mother.

She wrote memoirs of her early years, illustrated with her drawings and photographs related to the text. These, titled Spomini na otroštvo (Memories of Childhood), were published in nine installments in 1966 in the weekly Tedenska tribuna, the supplement of the Slovenski poročevalec newspaper. At that time she was the oldest Slovenian painter. In 2006, her memoirs, together with those of her mother and brother, were published by Nova revija in the book Življenje v lepi sobi (Life in a Beautiful Room).

== Later life and death ==
After retiring she moved to Ljubljana to live with her mother and sister Henrika, with whom she remained until their deaths. She never married and had no children. She continued to work prolifically as an artist. Her mother died in 1935, and her sister Henrika five years later. She held her first solo exhibition in 1955, showing her watercolors in Ljubljana, and later mounted one more solo show, also of watercolors. She died on 2 December 1968 in Ljubljana.

== Galery ==
Prints by Avgusta Šantel

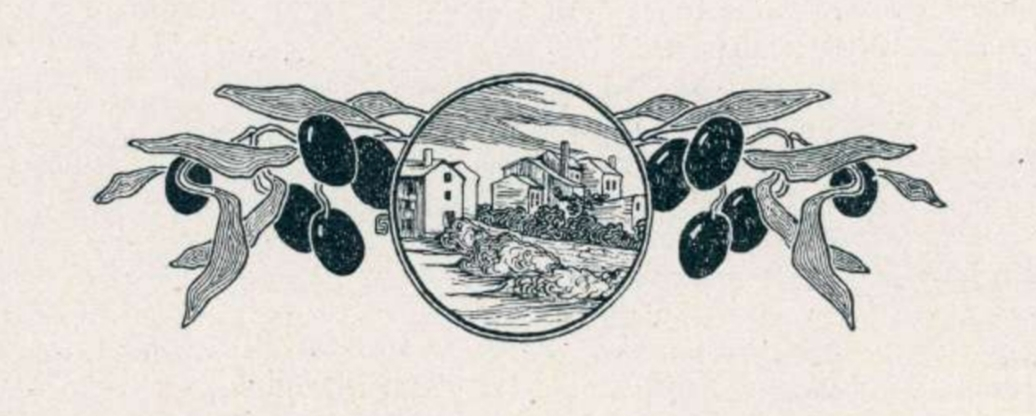
Village and an olive tree ornament (1905)

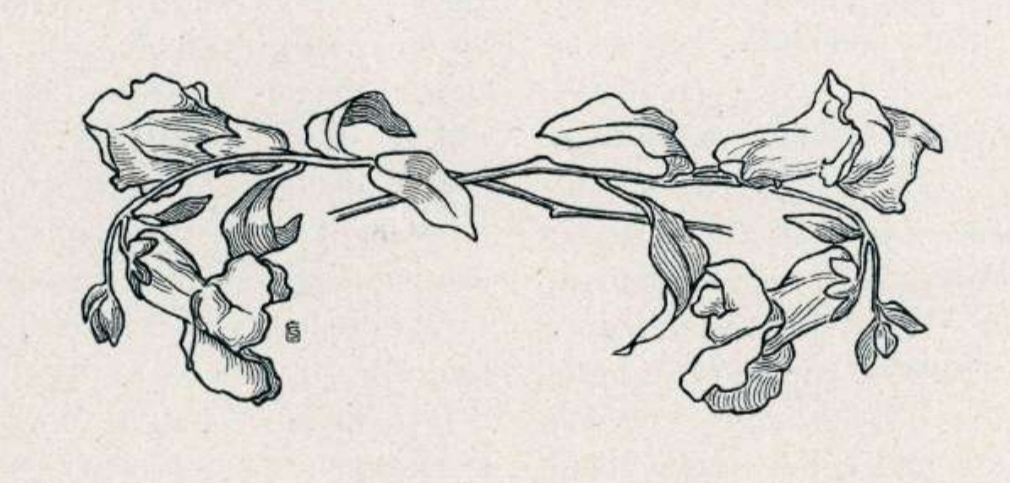
Flower twigs (1905)
