= Fredy Malec Koschitz =

Slovenian painter and woodcarver (1914–2001)

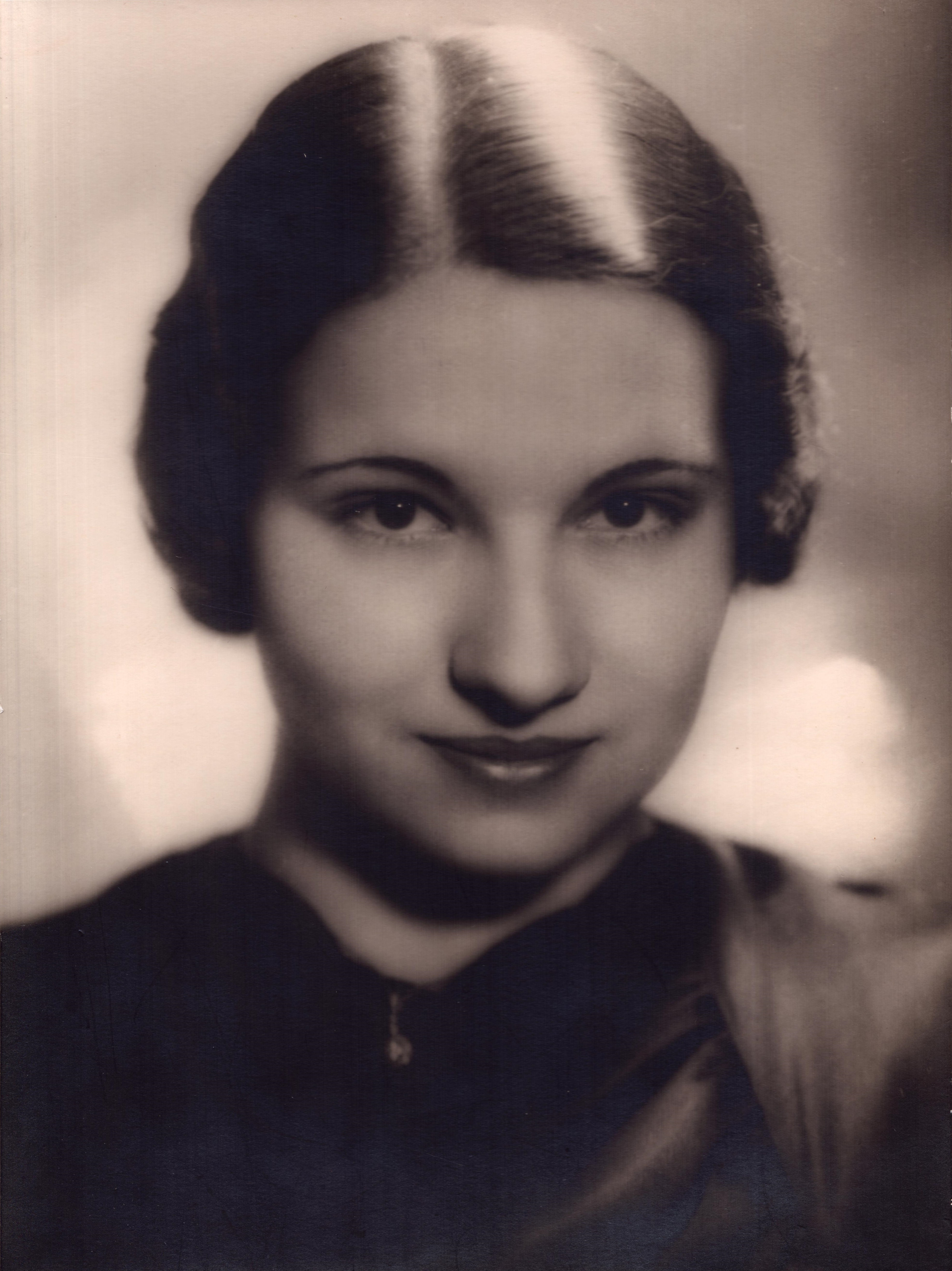
- Fredy Malec Koschitz around 1935
- Born: Friederike Malec; October 18, 1914; Ljubljana, Austria-Hungary
- Died: 2001 (aged 86–87); Klagenfurt, Austria
- Education: Academy of Fine Arts, Munich
- Occupations: Painter, woodcarver
- Relatives: Elza Kastl Obereigner (aunt); Liza Obereigner Hribar (cousin)

Friederike Malec Koschitz, also known as Fredy Malec Koschitz, (Note: She was also known by the names Frida, Frieda, and Fredi.) (18 October 1914 – 2001) was a Slovenian painter and woodcarver. She worked as an artist in what is now Slovenia and later in Austria. During the interwar and World War II period, she exhibited her paintings, which were influenced by modernist trends and French painting, particularly the work of Paul Cézanne. After the war, due to financial difficulties, she largely abandoned painting and devoted herself to woodcarving and folk art, producing decorative objects and later specialising in the restoration and painting sacred art in chapels. Over the course of her life, she painted sacred art in more than fifty chapels.

== Childhood ==
She was born on 18 October 1914 into an artistic family in Ljubljana. Her mother was Frida Kastl (1886–1957) from Ljubljana, a shop assistant, and her father was Zdenko Malec, an Austro-Hungarian army captain of Czech origin. In June 1915 her father died as a soldier in the World War I.

She and her mother therefore lived with her maternal grandmother, the shopkeeper Frančiška Julijani Peterka (1855–1943), in whose textile shop her mother was employed; her maternal grandfather, the senior Austro-Hungarian artillery officer Karl Kastl (1848–1920), who was also an amateur painter; her mother's sister, the sculptor and miniaturist Elza Kastl Obereigner; and Elza's daughter Elisabeth Charlotte Obereigner, later a sculptor known as Liza Obereigner Hribar.

After elementary school, she attended the municipal girls’ real gymnasium in Ljubljana (now Poljane Grammar School). She graduated there in June 1934.

== Education ==
While attending gymnasium, she also attended the Probuda evening art school (now the Srednja šola tehniških strok Šiška). There she attended a painting course with the painter Henrika Šantel, where she discovered her talent for painting. Later at Probuda she attended a life-drawing course with the painters Saša Šantel and Mirko Šubic, and a sculpture course with the sculptor Anton Sever.

In 1936 she went to Munich, where she enrolled in painting studies at the Academy of Fine Arts. She studied there for four semesters. Under the German painter Julius Hess (1878–1957), a professor there, she specialised in outdoor painting. After finishing her studies, she travelled with a group of fellow academy students to Sicily, where she spent the winter of 1938 painting landscapes. She then went to Florence, where she continued her artistic training for six months.

== Work ==
=== Wartime period ===
After her studies she returned to Yugoslavia and devoted herself to painting. In 1940 she married Otto Koschitz (1911–1961), a journalist of German origin from Rogaška Slatina, who was oitherwise fluent in Slovene language. During the following four years she gave birth to three daughters. The eldest, Karin Koschitz Woschitz (born 1941), later became a sculptor.

At first she lived with her family in Zagreb, and soon after the birth of her first child moved to Maribor. Between 1939 and 1945 she painted and exhibited extensively, mostly in group exhibitions in Graz, Leoben, and Maribor under the auspices of the Maribor branch of the Association of Styrian Artists and Art Lovers. This was an association of German-oriented artists and, during the German occupation of Yugoslavia, the only cultural organisation that enabled visual artists to exhibit. The association was closely connected with the Nazi Party. According to art historian Andreja Borin, a specialist on the painter's work, it is not clear whether the artist herself was personally sympathetic to Nazism.

In 1943 she held her first solo art exhibition in Maribor. Her surviving paintings from this period are distinguished by a refined sense of colour and light, and also reveal knowledge of Paul Cézanne and his method of constructing the painted surface, most likely an influence of her teacher at the Munich academy, Julius Hess. According to Andreja Borin, her work from this period shows a restrained modernism with French models. Two of her paintings from this period are in the permanent collection of the Maribor Art Gallery, and some are held by the Neue Galerie Graz. A few months before the end of the war she fled with her daughters to Austria, where her husband later joined her.

=== Post-war period ===
After fleeing to Austria, she had to give up painting because of financial difficulties and devoted herself to folk art instead. She supported her family by making and selling decorative wooden objects, which were easier to sell than paintings in the Austrian countryside where she lived. She mainly carved and cut religious images, chess pieces, dolls, nativity scenes, and wooden boxes. Soon she also began receiving commissions, which gave her greater financial security.

Later she and her family settled in Klagenfurt, where she continued to provide for her family through woodcarving. According to the testimony of her eldest daughter, she often said that she was grateful for her artistic training because it meant she did not have to earn a living by doing repairs and cleaning in other people's houses. After a few years she also began painting rural furniture. She also did some illustration work.

In the early 1960s she also began painting and restoring chapels. In 1961 her husband died after a long illness. Over time she devoted herself entirely to the restoration and painting of chapels. In the following decades she painted more than fifty chapels.

== Later life and death ==
She continued restoration work even in old age. She often travelled abroad to visit a daughter who had settled outside Austria. She died in 2001 in Klagenfurt.

== Misidentification and rediscovery ==
For a long time, the Maribor Art Gallery mistakenly believed that the name belonged to a man. While preparing the exhibition Ladies First! Women Artists in and from Styria, 1850–1950 (2020) at the Neue Galerie Graz, the exhibition curator, Austrian art historian Gudrun Danzer, searched for information about women artists in Styria and discovered an artist, whom an article in the Marburger Zeitung had called Fredi Koschitz. Because Gurdun Danzer was also collaborating with the Maribor Art Gallery, the Maribor-based art historian and senior curator Andreja Borin heard of the artist and decided to investigate who she was. After a long search, she found the name of sculptor Elza Kastl Obereigner in an archival document listing registered family members at a Ljubljana address. Through sculptors's descendants she established that Fredi was the artist Friederike Malec, who signed her works as Fredy.

== Books with her illustrations ==
- Staub unter Sternen (written by Herbert Strutz, Heyn, 1965, Klagenfurt)
