= Henrika Šantel =

Slovenian artist (1874–1940)

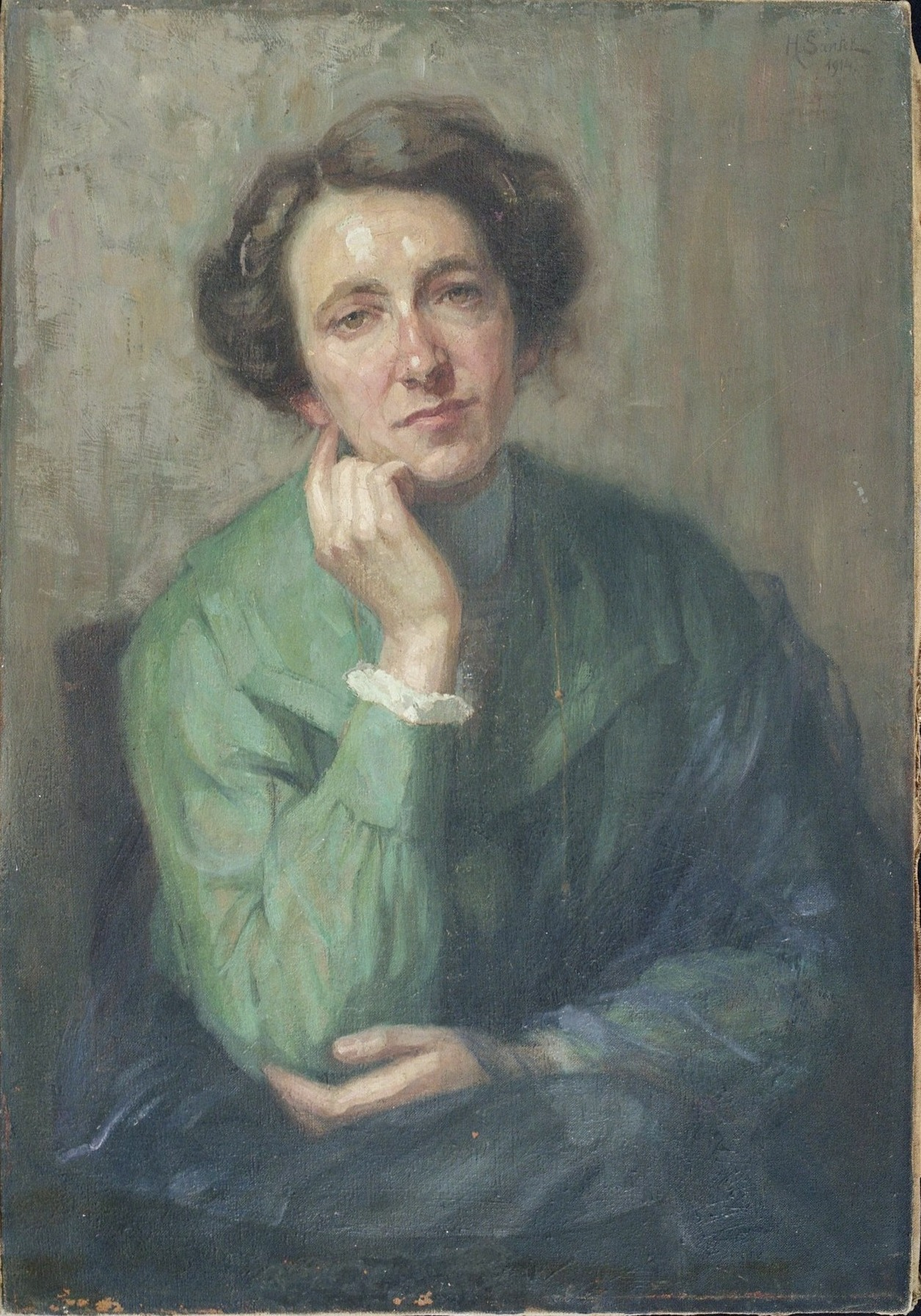
- Henrika Šantel, self-portrait, 1914
- Style: realist painting

Henrika Šantel (17 August 1874 – 15 February 1940) was a Slovenian realist painter.

== Biography ==
Šantel was born in Gorizia (in northeast Italy, currently on the border with Slovenia), then part of Austria-Hungary. Her mother, Avgusta Aigentler Šantel, was a painter and provided initial education for Henrika at home. Her sister, Avgusta Šantel, was a painter as well. In 1891, Henrika moved to Munich to study at the women's art academy (Damenacademie) with Friedrich Fehr and Ludwig Schmid-Reutte. She subsequently returned to Gorizia and taught art. After World War I, Gorizia was transferred to Italy, and Šantel with the whole family moved to Maribor, which was in Yugoslavia. In 1929, she moved to Ljubljana, where she stayed until her death. Among her students was painter and woodcarver Fredy Malec Koschitz.
