= Nikolaj Pirnat =

Slovene painter and sculptor

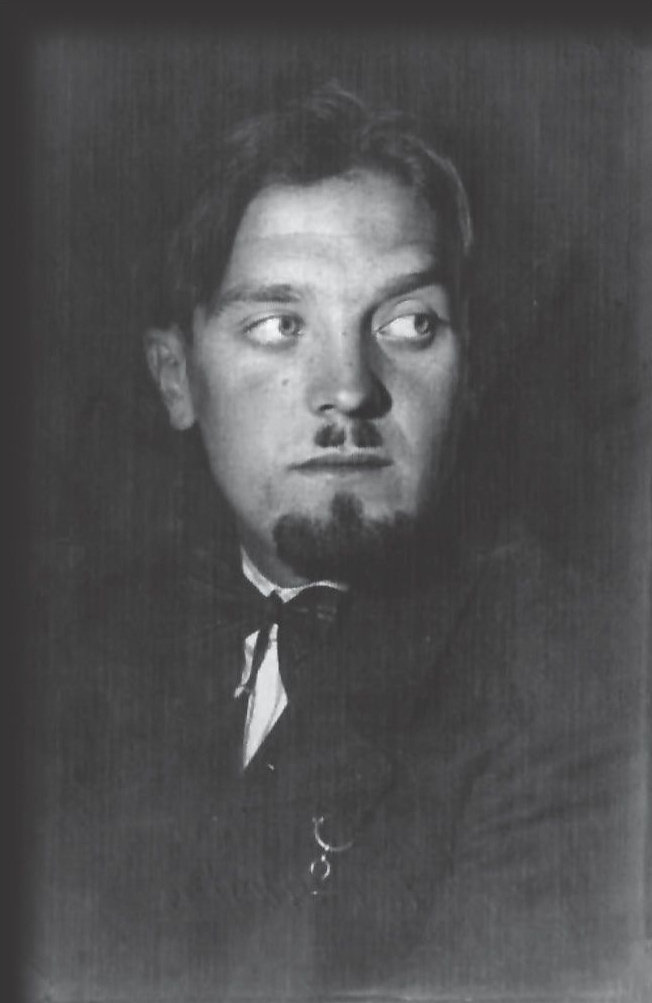
- Born: 10 December 1903; Idrija, Austria-Hungary
- Died: 9 January 1948 (aged 44); Ljubljana, Yugoslavia
- Other names: Captain Kopjejkin, Miklavž Breugnon
- Occupations: Painter, illustrator, sculptor
- Style: social realism

Military service
- Branch/service: Yugoslav partisans
- Awards: Order of Brotherhood and Unity; Order for Merit to the People

Nikolaj Pirnat (10 December 1903, Idrija, Austria-Hungary – 9 January 1948, Ljubljana, Yugoslavia) was a Slovene painter and sculptor. He was the earliest exponent of social realism in Slovene fine arts.

== Biography ==
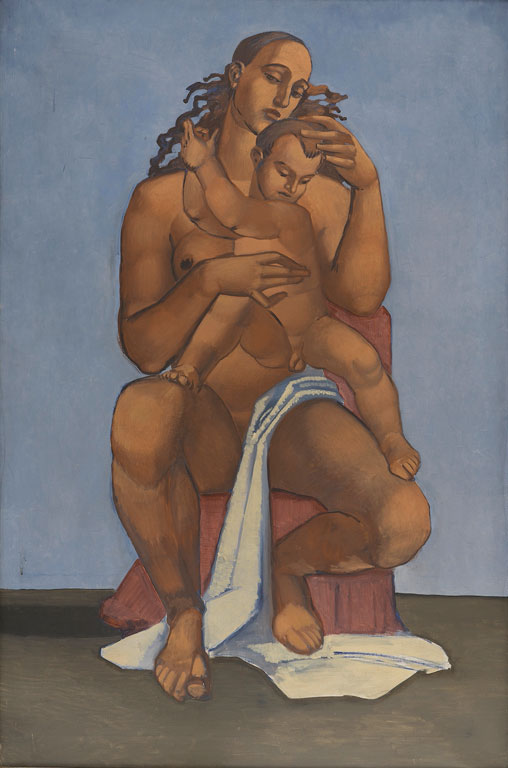
Mother with child (Mati z otrokom), 1928

Nikolaj Pirnat was born on 10 December 1903 in Idrija (then Austria-Hungary) as the son of writer Maks Pirnat. He attended high school in Kranj and Idrija. He spent four and a half years studying at the Academy of Arts in Zagreb, graduating in sculpting alongside Ivan Meštrović in 1925. In 1927 he spent a year in Paris as part of his studies.

In 1928 he moved from Maribor to Ljubljana, where he held a solo exhibition of his paintings and started working as an illustrator in the editorial office of the liberal newspaper Jutro until the breakout of the Second World War.

In 1942 he was imprisoned in the Italian Gonars concentration camp. Many of Pirnat's drawings from the camp have been preserved. After the capitulation of Italy in 1943 and the subsequent liberation of the camp, he joined the Yugoslav partisans and worked at the headquarters' art propaganda department. During this period, he went by the pen names Captain Kopjejkin and Miklavž Breugnon. He attained the rank of captain and was awarded the Order of Brotherhood and Unity and the Order for Merit to the People. After the liberation of Belgrade, he became the illustrator for the newspaper Borba.

Following the end of the war and the creation of the Socialist Yugoslav state in 1945, he was appointed professor of drawing at the newly established Academy of Fine Arts in Ljubljana.

He died in Ljubljana on 9 January 1948.

== Style and works ==
Pirnat's art is noted for its social critique, which often borders on satire. He is among the earliest exponents of social realism in Slovene art and was also among the representatives of early Yugoslav socialist realism prior to the Tito–Stalin split. One of his main early influences was Pablo Picasso.

His oeuvre consists of sculptures (General Rudolf Maister, 1926; Igralec Danilo, 1933), portraits and various oil paintings. Pirnat's statue of John the Baptist is located at the center of the Trnovo Bridge in Ljubljana. Some of his works are held in the collections of the Museum of Modern Art, the National Museum of Natural History, both in Ljubljana, and the Maribor Art Gallery.

He also illustrated books, namely Oton Župančič's Ciciban (in 1932), Cervantes' Don Quixote, (1935–1937) and others.

== Gallery ==
Partisan graphics

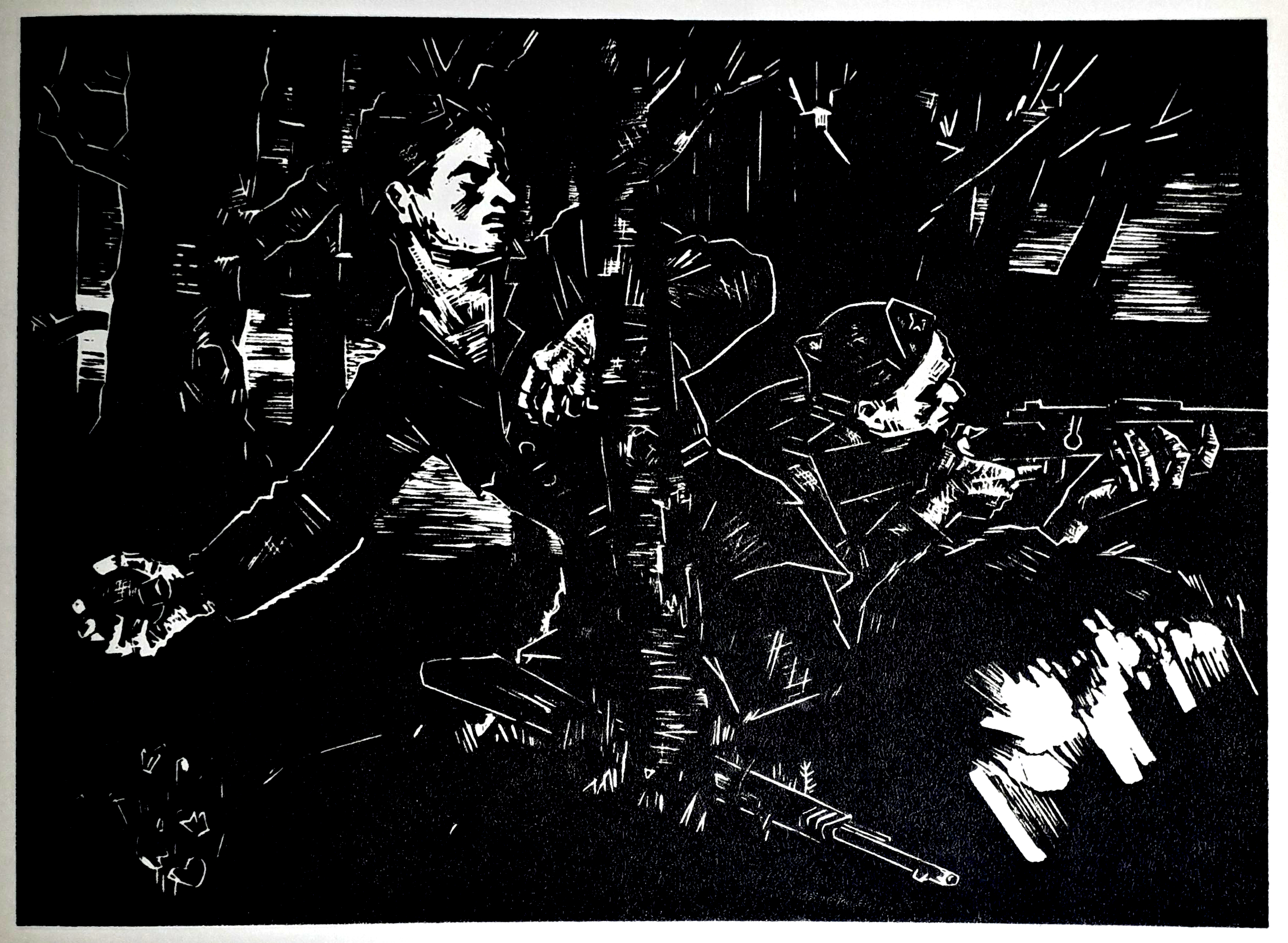
Iz ciklusa, linocut,1943

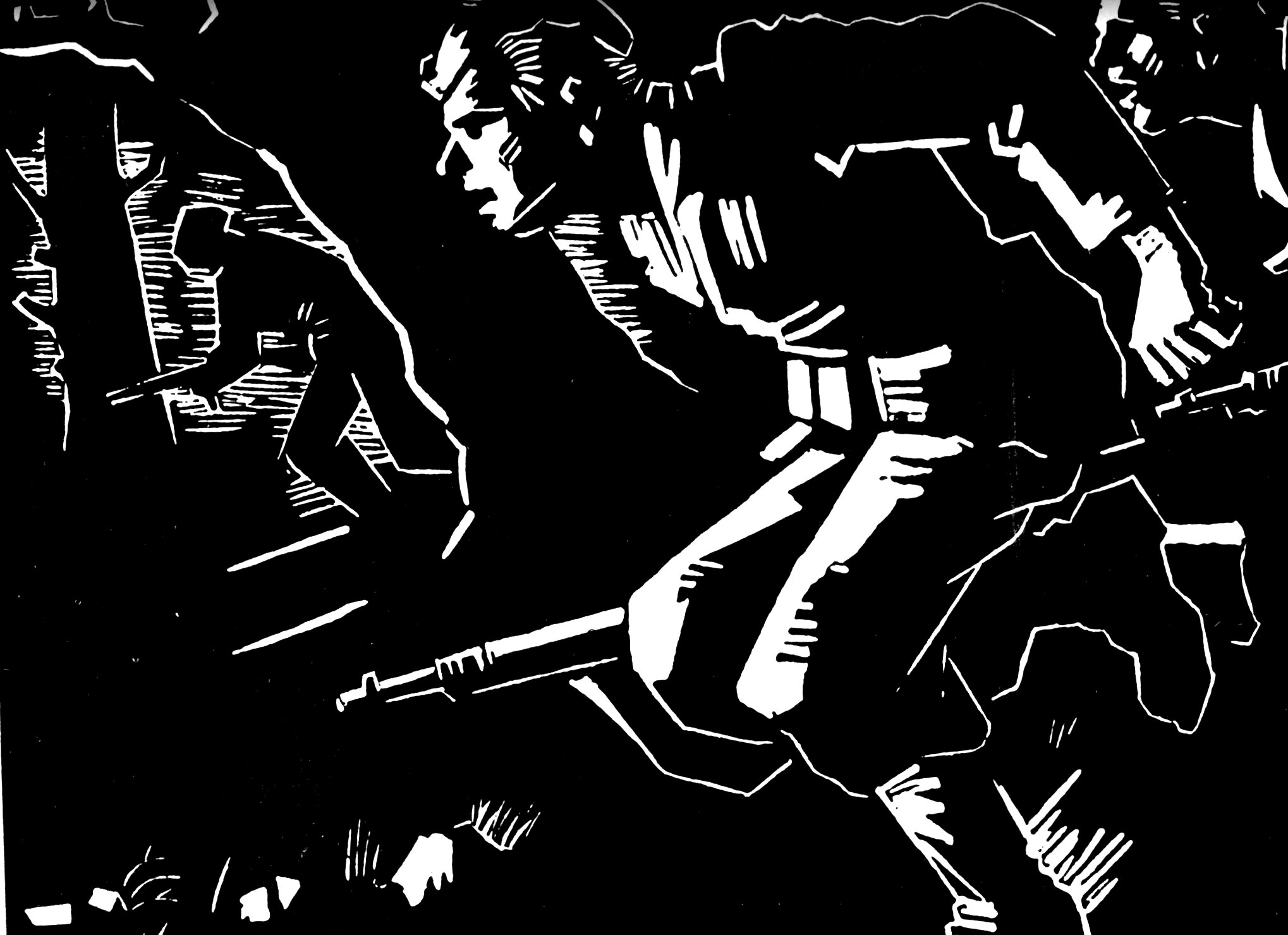
Juriš,1943

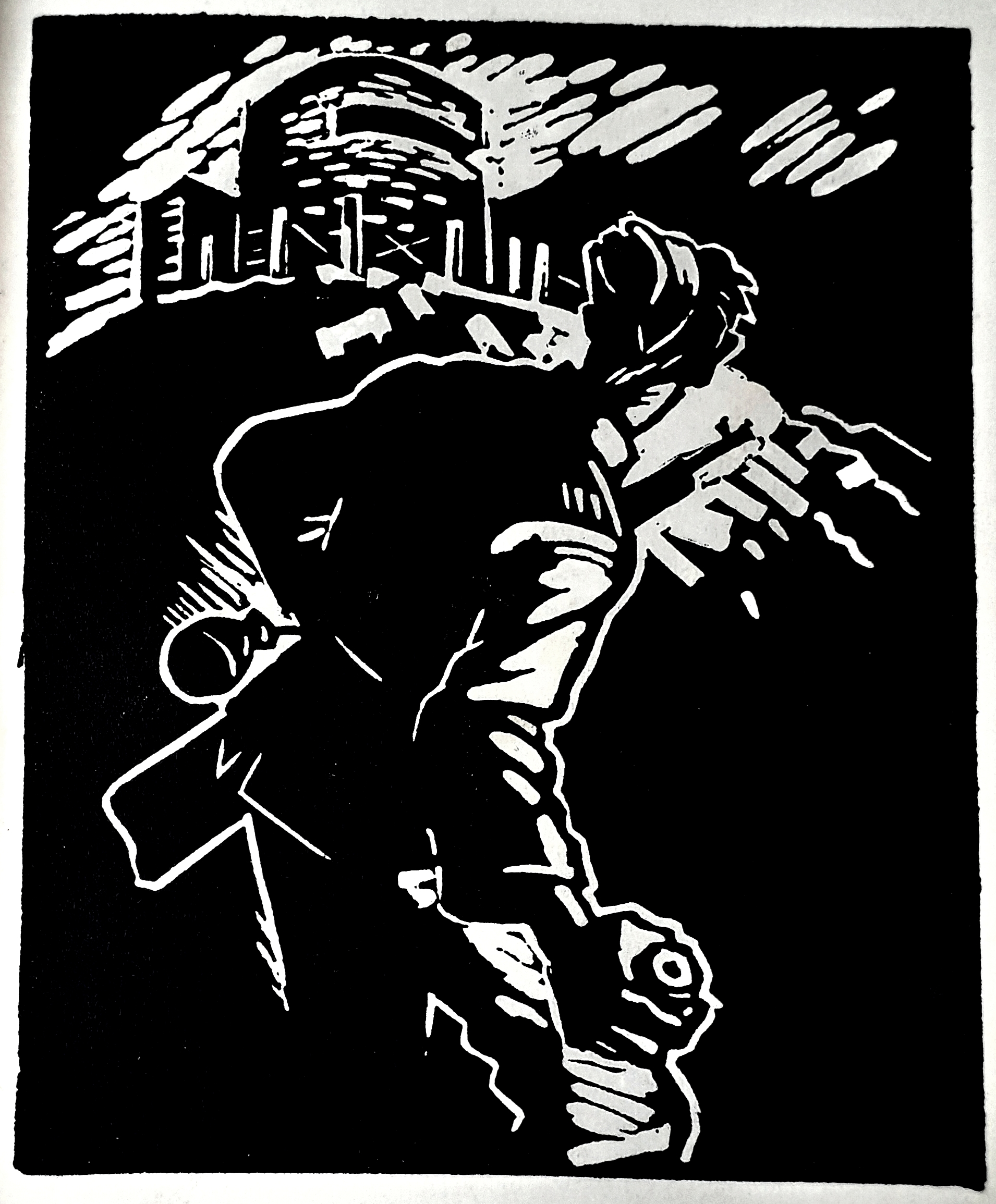
Na bunker, 1941–1945

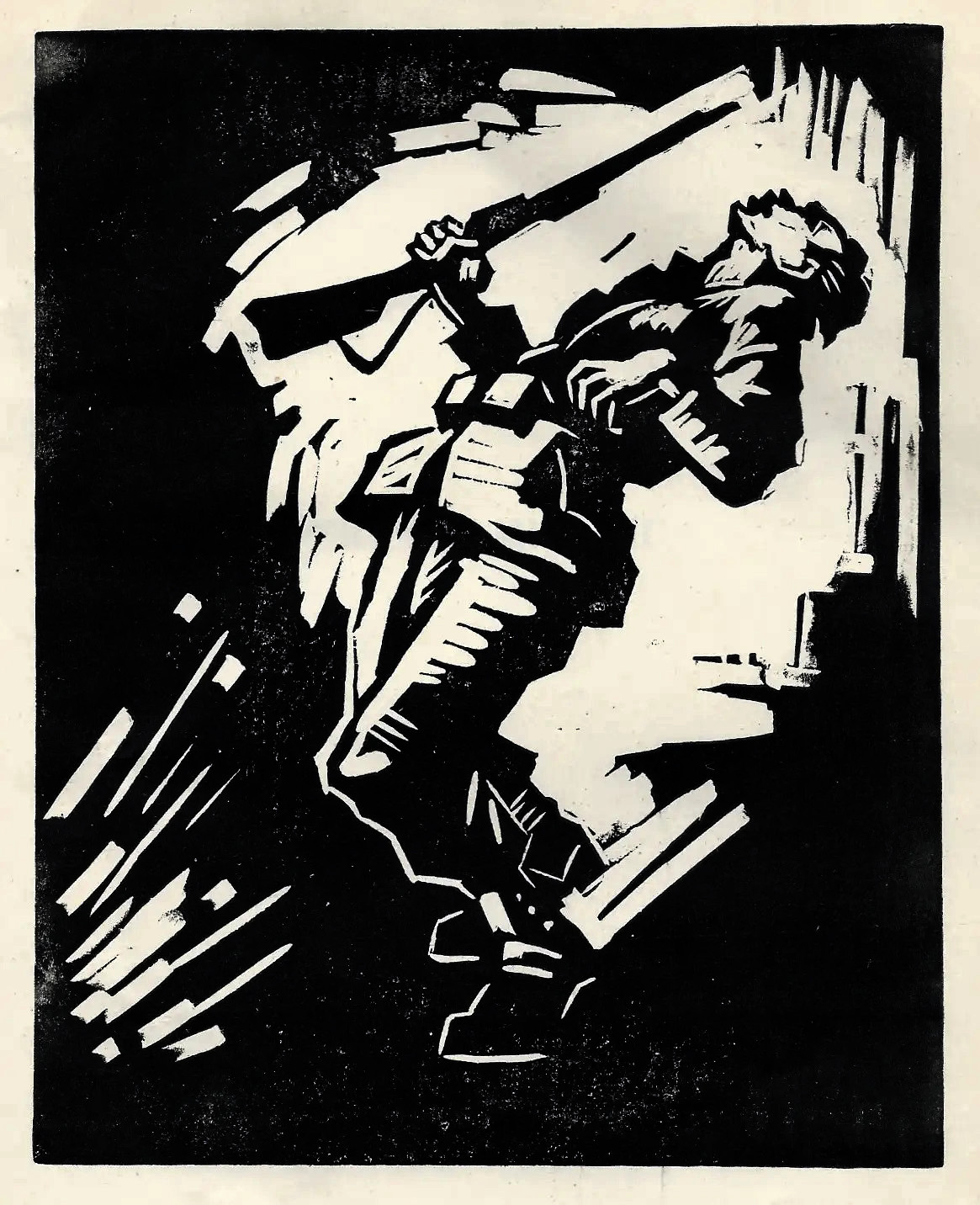
Poslednji juriš, linocut, 1943

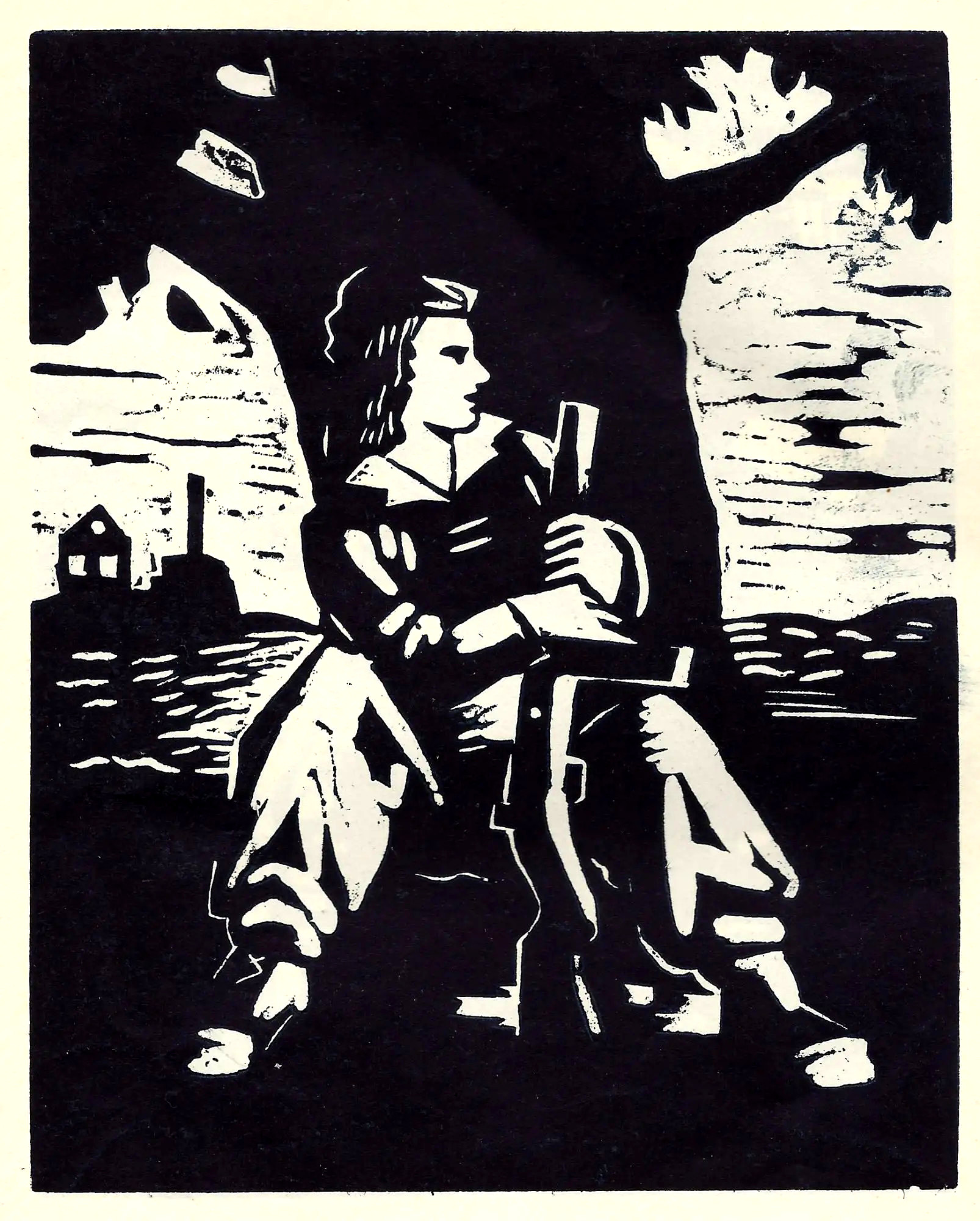
Partizanka, 1943
Posters

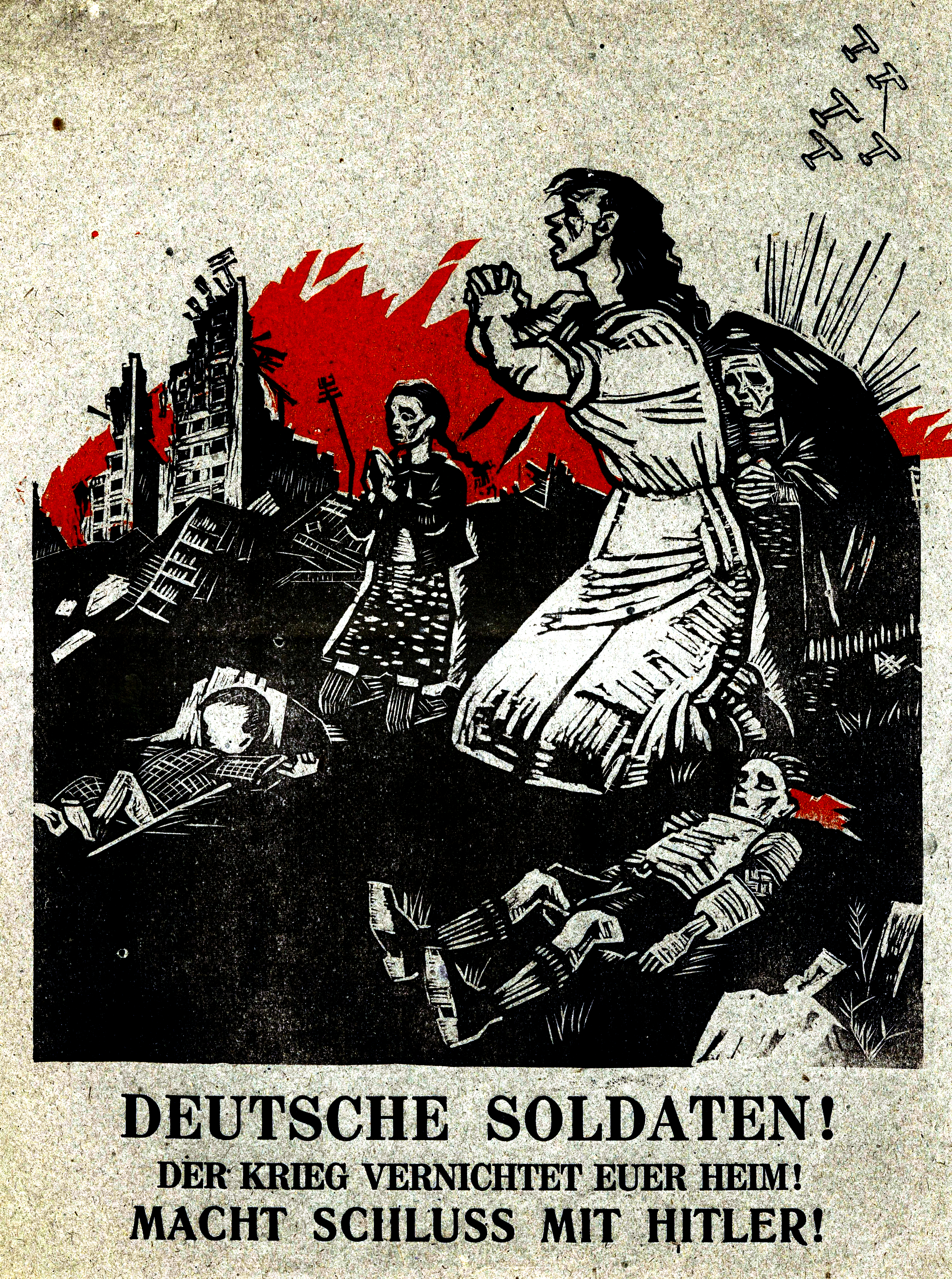
Deutsche soldaten, 1941

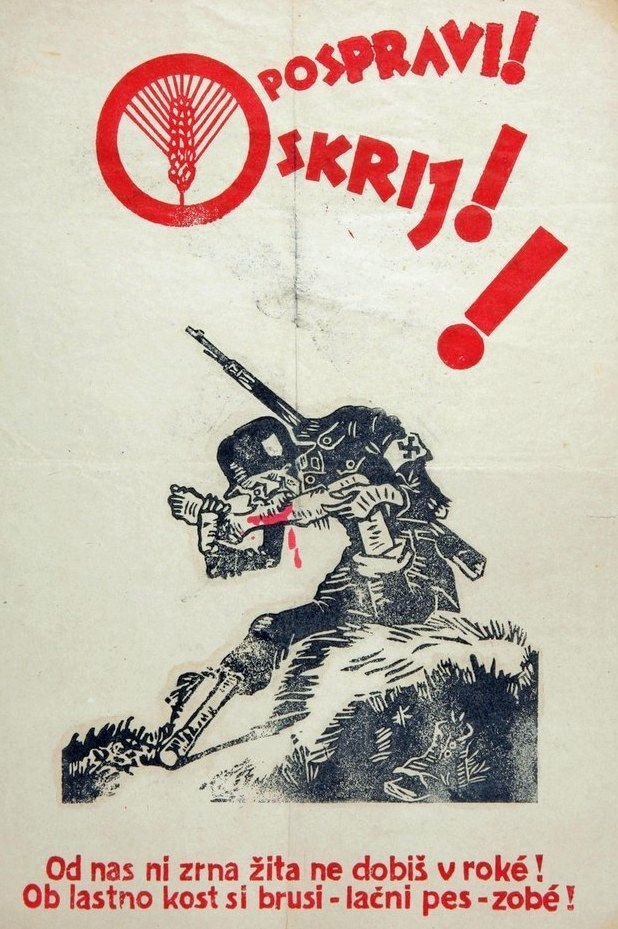
Pospravi, Skrij, 1941

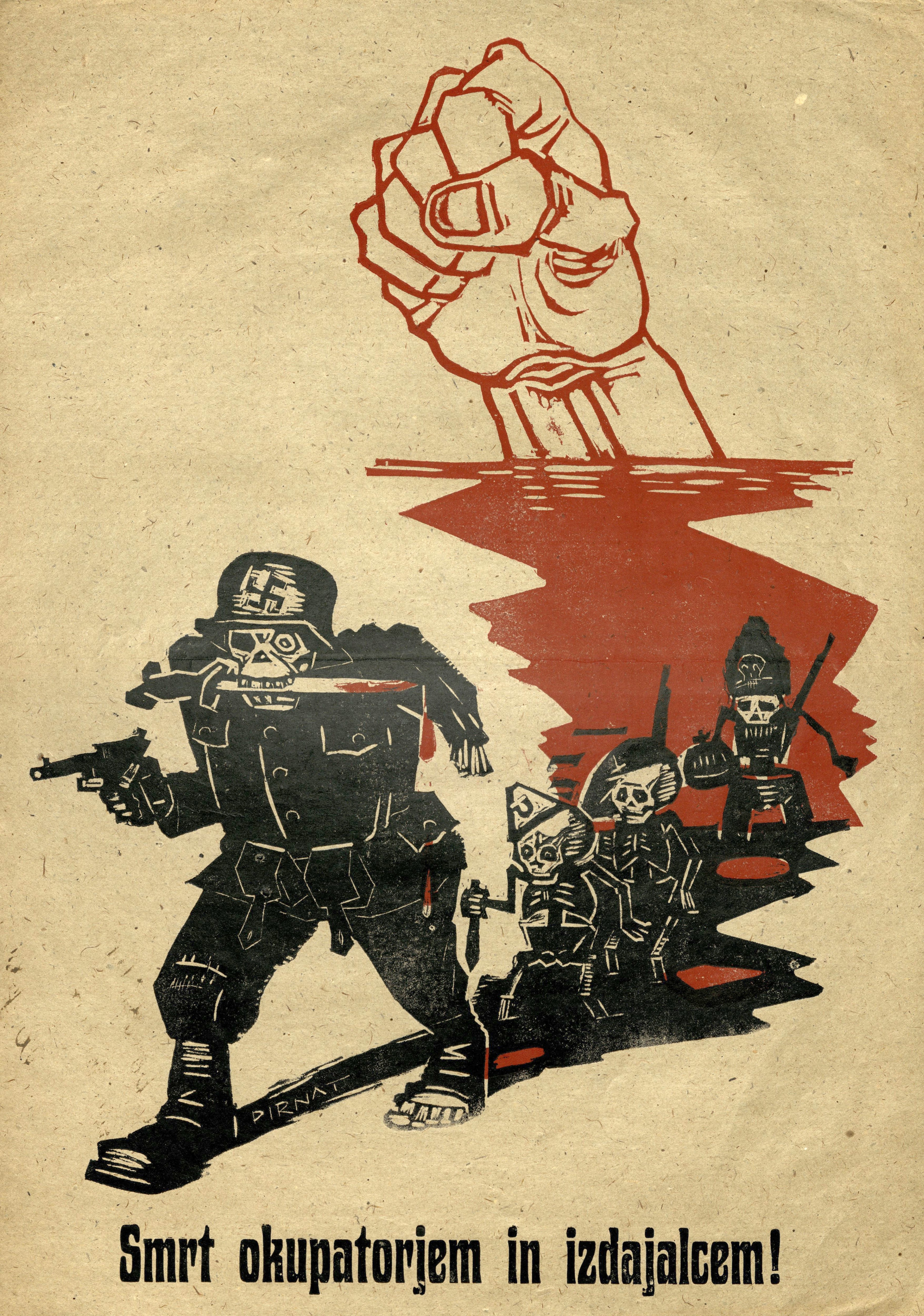
Smrt okupatorjem in izdajalcem!, 1941

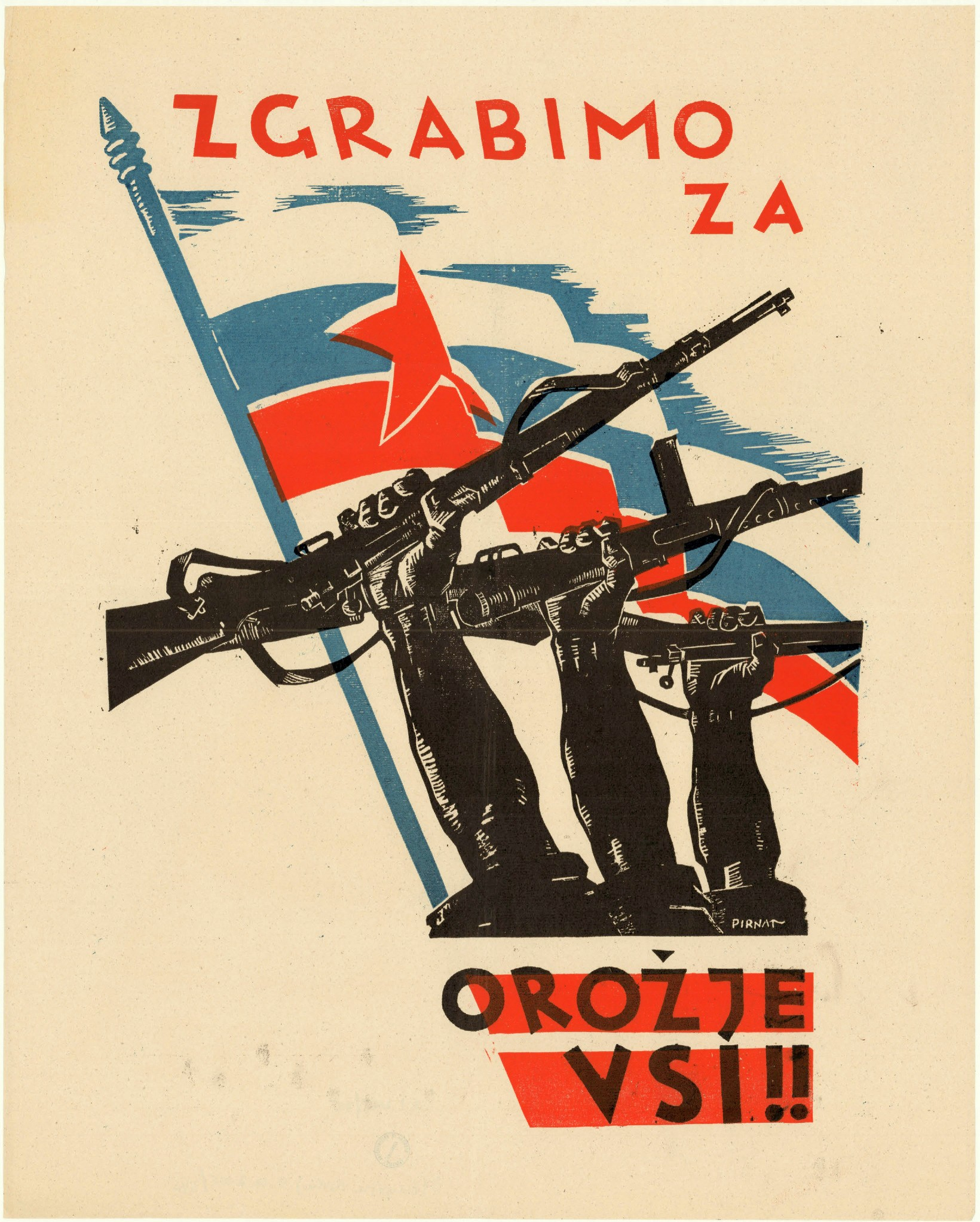
Zgrabimo za orožje vsi!!, 1942

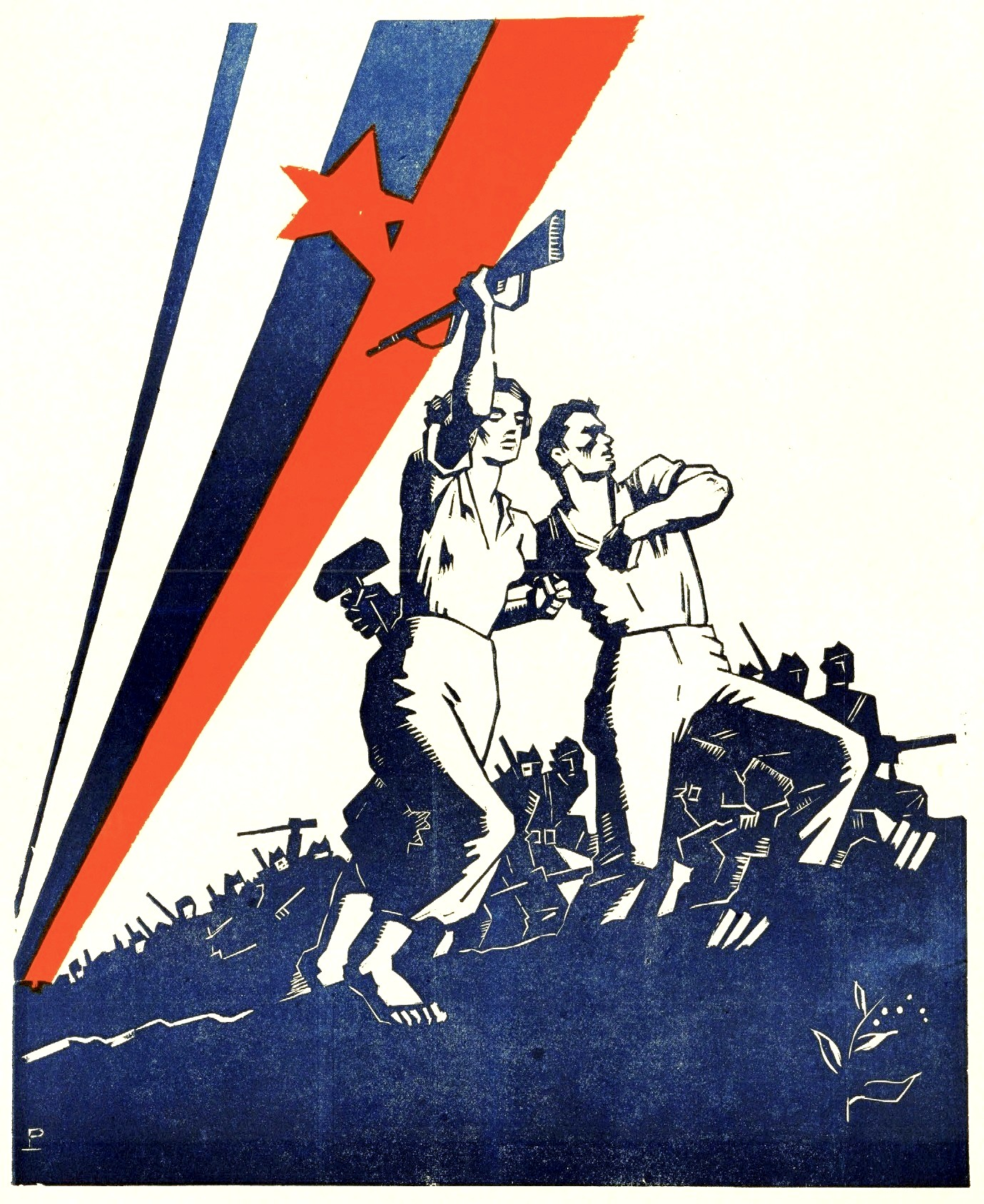
Proletarca na jurišu, 1944
