= Krka (company) =

Pharmaceutical company in Slovenia

Krka, d. d.
- Official logo
- Company type: Public
- Industry: Pharmaceutical
- Founded: 23 April 1954; 72 years ago
- Headquarters: Šmarješka cesta 6, Novo Mesto, Slovenia
- Key people: Jože Colarič (CEO)
- Products: Prescription pharmaceuticals, non-prescription products, animal health products, health-resort and tourist services
- Revenue: ▲€1.9 billion (2024)
- Net income: ▲€356 million (2024)
- Number of employees: 12,810 (2024)
- Website: www.krka.biz

Krka, d. d., Novo mesto is an international generic pharmaceutical company with headquarters in Novo Mesto, Slovenia. In 2023, Krka Group's total sales amounted to 1.806 billion euros. The net profit of the Krka Group totalled €313.7 million. Krka sells products to more than 70 countries. In Slovenia the company has production sites in Ločna and Bršljin (both in Novo Mesto), Krško, Šentjernej and Ljutomer; several departments are spread across various parts of Ljubljana as well. Krka also has production and distribution centers in Russia, Poland, Croatia, and Germany. At the end of 2023, Krka Group had 12,753 employees.

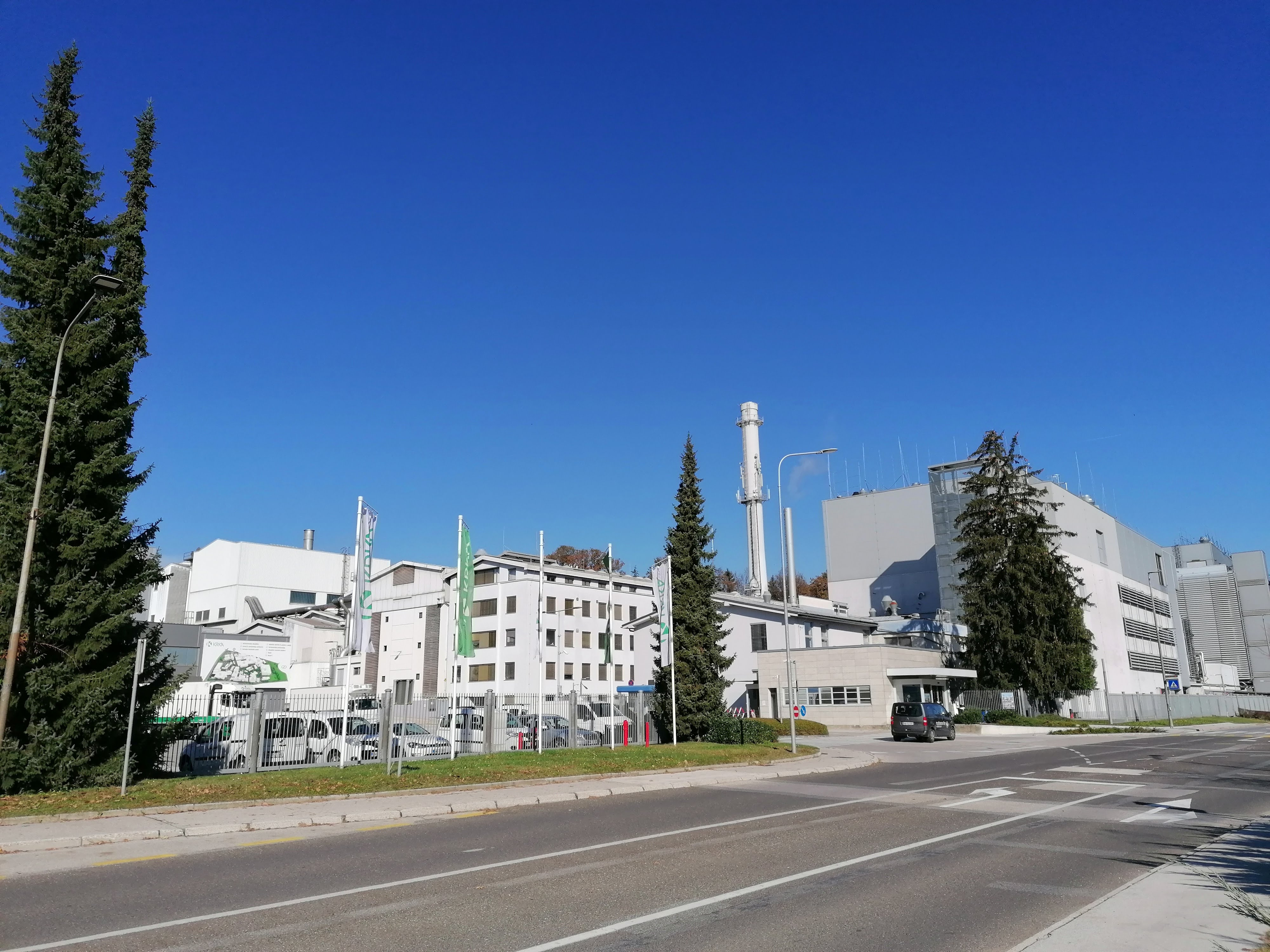
Headquarters in Novo Mesto

== Activities and products ==
Krka's business is founded on pharmaceutical and chemical activities. Prescription pharmaceuticals remain its main product group, with an 81.7% share of Krka Group's total sales in 2023. They are followed in sales volume by non-prescription products (9.9%) and animal health products (5.8%).

Krka produces a wide range of prescription pharmaceuticals used in the treatment of cardiovascular diseases, alimentary tract diseases, central nervous system diseases, pain, diabetes and blood clots. The company also produces oncology medicines, medicines for the systemic treatment of infections, medicines for the treatment of diseases of the blood and blood-forming organs, medicines for urinary tract diseases as well as medicines for respiratory system diseases.

Krka's non-prescription products are aimed at preventing diseases and treating minor illnesses that do not require medical attention. Key product groups are cough and cold remedies, vitamins and minerals, pain killers, drugs for treating alimentary tract diseases and metabolic disorders, allergy medications, and products for improving memory and concentration.

Krka’s main animal health products are intended for pets: antiparasitics, pain killers and medications for treating infections. The company also produces medicines for treating farm animals.

Krka's line of business is supplemented by health-resort and tourist services of the subsidiary, the Terme Krka Group. It unites the business units of the spa complexes and hotels Terme Dolenjske Toplice, Terme Šmarješke Toplice, the coastal centre Talaso Strunjan, and Otočec Hotels. Terme Krka's basic line of business is the medical rehabilitation after cardiovascular and respiratory system diseases, as well as mobility problems.

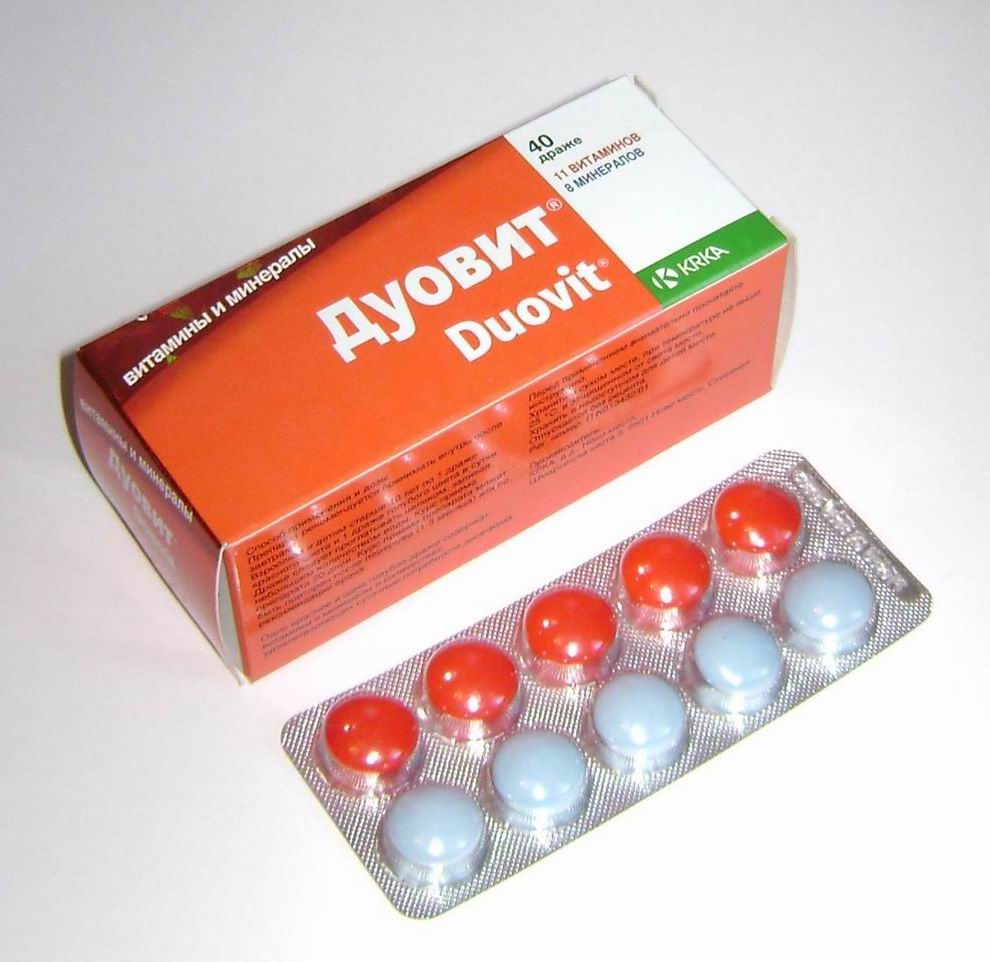
Vitamin pastilles Duovit

== Markets and business network ==
Krka is an international company, selling 94% of its products in more than 70 countries worldwide. Subsidiaries and representative offices are present in the most important markets, while its production capacities are also located in Russia, Poland, Croatia and Germany.

Krka’s biggest markets are the Russian Federation, Poland and Germany. Region East Europe is Krka Group's largest sales region, representing 33.0% of total sales. It is followed by Region Central Europe with 22.1% of total sales, Region West Europe with 20.5% of total sales and Region South East Europe with 14.3% of total sales. In Slovenia, Krka achieved 6.2% of its total sales. Krka products are also available in the Middle and Far East, Africa and the Americas. Region Overseas Markets accounted for 4.2% of total sales.

Krka, a Slovenian pharmaceutical company, continues to operate in Russia despite the country’s invasion of Ukraine and the imposition of international sanctions.

== Research and development ==
Krka develops generics. The company primarily synthesizes known active ingredients through its own processes. The company also produces single-pill combinations containing two or more active ingredients, enabling patients to receive dual or triple therapy in a single dose.

Products are marketed under Krka’s own brands.

== History ==
Krka was built on a long tradition of pharmacy in the Novo Mesto area. The first pharmacies began to emerge behind monastery walls in this region as early as the 12th and 13th centuries. By the 15th century, a monastery pharmacy was established in Novo Mesto. The first regional pharmacy in Novo Mesto was founded in 1570 with support from regional authorities. It was managed by Peter Klaus, who worked as a pharmacist's assistant. This pharmacy remained operational continuously for 380 years until 1950 when it was nationalized and renamed the Novo Mesto Town Pharmacy.

The Krka Pharmaceutical Laboratory was founded in 1954 on the initiative of Boris Andrijanič, who was running the Novo Mesto Town Pharmacy at the time. Initially, it employed only nine workers, but within two years it had already grown into a pharmaceutical factory. Although the first medicines were registered on the domestic market, Krka started making inroads into foreign markets already in the 1960s. During this period, it added licensed products to its product portfolio and obtained its first US Food and Drug Administration (FDA) registrations for the production of antibiotics by the late 1970s.

In the early 1980s, Krka shifted its focus to developing its own value-added generic products. It began expanding its international marketing network, significantly strengthening its position in European markets. Throughout this period, Krka intensively increased its production capacity and invested in research and development.

In 1985, the Works Council appointed Miloš Kovačič as the new Chairman of Krka's Management Board. In 1997, Krka became a public limited company and listed its shares on the Ljubljana Stock Exchange. In 2005, Jože Colarič became the third Chairman of the Management Board and CEO.
