= Justina Hermina Pacek =

Slovenian nurse, and photographer (1931–2016)

- Born: Justina Pacek; 27 February 1931; Malo Mraševo, Kingdom of Yugoslavia
- Died: 14 February 2016 (aged 84); Mengeš, Municipality of Mengeš, Slovenia
- Occupations: Nurse, photographer, painter, illustrator
- Known for: Documentary photography

Justina Pacek, Sister Hermina (27 February 1931 – 14 February 2016) was a Slovenian nurse, photographer, painter, and illustrator. She is remembered for her photographs of ill children and the nurses caring for them, nuns at work and free time, and her documentary photo report on the enclosed Catholic community of Croats in the village of Letnica, Kosovo. She is the first known photographer among the members of Daughters of Charity.

== Early life ==
Justina Hermina was born on 27 February 1931 in Malo Mraševo. Her mother and father were farmers. She loved to draw from a young age, and her talent for art was noticed by her second-grade teacher, who saw her drawing of Saint Nicholas and angels. The teacher encouraged her parents to send her to art school after she finished elementary school.

=== Imprisonment ===
After the German occupation in April 1941, the border between the German and Italian-occupied parts of Slovenia ran near her family’s home. On 15 June 1942 the Germans deported eleven-year-old Justina Hermina along with her parents and siblings to the Rajhenburg assembly camp in Brestanica.From there, they were transported by train to the town of Lautenthal in northern Germany, where they were forced to build a labor camp. Upon arrival, the camp leader ordered them: “You must forget your language and your faith!”. Justina Hermina inwardly resisted this, as her mother had raised her with deep faith. At the camp, she and other girls were forced to do hard labor in the forest. In June 1945, shortly before the camp’s liberation, her mother died.

=== Artistic education ===
After the camp was liberated, Justina Hermina returned home with her father and siblings to find their home looted and burned. Without their mother, a farmer, the family struggled to survive, and despite help from neighbors, food was scarce. Justina's schooling had ended when she was taken to the camp, and any thoughts of attending art school were gone. The priest in their parish had been imprisoned by the communist authorities. She later said she grew up "wild and self-taught".

However, she soon felt a calling to religious life. In 1946, she drew a picture of baby Jesus with a lamb for her younger sister's religious class, as her sister didn’t know how to draw. When the catechist discovered Justina Hermina's artistic talent, he began to encourage and support her creativity. Her older sister provided her with painting supplies. She mostly depicted religious subjects and nature.

== Career ==
In 1954, she worked for three months as a housemaid for the academic sculptor Vladimir Stoviček, who taught her the basics of drawing and painting.

=== Introduction to photography ===
Her talent for drawing and painting caught the attention of photographer Marija Lovšin Bavec, who persuaded her to start learning photography in 1956 with her daughter, Sonja Bavec, who needed a skilled retoucher for her glass-plate negatives. Justina Hermina immediately dedicated herself to retouching in Sonja’s photography studio. Every negative had to be retouched using a finely sharpened pencil under a strong electric light, which was very exhausting. She longed to begin photographing outside the studio.

Her opportunity came when Sonja went on a trip to Zagreb and a master mason came to the studio requesting photographs of the masons building a new large structure in the center of Brežice. She photographed the work with an old Leica camera that had a good lens but no light meter or rangefinder. She successfully completed her first photo reportage in the field and began photographing events, family celebrations, confirmations, first communions, and first masses, first with Sonja and later on her own.

=== Religious life and further education ===
While photographing a confirmation, she met a Daughter of Charity in civilian clothes and learned that the order had reopened its novitiate in Belgrade. This reminded her of her desire for religious life. However, entry into the order required a completed primary education, which she lacked due to her deportation. Despite this, she was eventually accepted. In early spring 1957, she traveled to Belgrade and entered the Daughters of Charity.

She enrolled in evening school to complete primary education and then completed a four-year nursing program in Zemun. During nursing school, she began working in neurosurgery in Belgrade, then transferred to the children's clinic, where she worked as a nurse until retirement.

=== Return to photography ===
She returned to photography in 1962 during the Second Vatican Council when changes within the order required updated photos of all sisters for ID cards. The central leadership in Paris also requested photos of the convent buildings in Belgrade and Slovenia, a project assigned to Justina Hermina.

Soon after, she began photographing important events, church ceremonies, and jubilees. Initially, she used a local photo studio, but by 1963 her superiors equipped her with a darkroom and camera equipment. Until 1964, she used a Balda Jubilette Leica camera, later upgrading to a Zorki camera. She made copies, enlargements, and hand-colored photographs using transparent photo paints. She also photographed sick children, her colleagues caring for them, and her fellow sisters at work and in their daily lives.

After six years in Belgrade, she visited Slovenia with her camera, photographing relatives and villagers. She returned yearly until retirement, documenting her nieces’ and village children’s growth. She also photographed the elderly and needy in Škocjan and Raka near Krško, and the Sisters of Charity who helped them. One notable photo depicts the impoverished of the Kozjansko region.

At the time (1970), it was nearly unheard of for a nun to photograph in religious habit. One of her first major external events was photographing the first mass of her nephew, Jože Pacek.

==== Letnica report ====
Her most valuable work is a documentary photo report on the Catholic community in the village of Letnica, Kosovo. Before retirement, she filled in as a nurse at a clinic in the remote Catholic village. The community, of Croatian origin, had migrated from Dalmatia 300 years earlier to mine iron, but remained even after the mines closed, living in deep poverty. The sisters treated both villagers and their animals. In her free time, Justina Hermina photographed the landscape, buildings, and people. These images are precious because in the 1990s, due to fear of Serbian nationalism, most residents fled to Croatia, ending 300 years of Croatian presence in Letnica.

== Drawing and painting ==
Alongside photography, she also drew and painted. Starting as self-taught and learning under Vladimir Stoviček, she continued to create while working as a nurse. She painted religious motifs for the convent, cheerful drawings for young patients, and gifts for relatives. During holidays, she decorated the children’s hospital with her own posters and artwork.

== Later life and death ==
She retired in 1987 and returned to Slovenia. After her departure, the Belgrade photo studio was closed and equipment sold. She took her old Leica camera that launched her photography career with her. In Frankolovo, where she settled, she worked as a cook for three years before becoming a catechist. She had completed a correspondence catechetical course. She served as a catechist in Čatež ob Savi, Podbočje, and Cerklje ob Krki.

In 2008, she fell ill and was transferred to the St. Catherine Care Home in Mengeš, where she died on 14 February 2016.
