= Ambroz Testen =

Croatian Franciscan expressionistic painter

Ambroz Janez Tasten
- Born: 31 August 1897; Loka pri Mengšu, Kamnik, Slovenia
- Died: 7 January 1984 (aged 86); Zadar, Croatia
- Notable work: Dvije duše razgovaraju (Two souls talking); Križni put (Stations of the Cross)
- Style: watercolor painting
- Movement: expressionism

Ambroz Janez (Janko) Testen (31 August 1897 – 7 January 1984) was Franciscan and Croatian expressionistic painter of Slovenian descent.

== Biography ==
He was born in village Loka pri Mengšu near Kamnik in northern Slovenia. He moved to Croatia as a teenager to become a Franciscan. His monk name was Benedict.

Before World War I he lived in a monastery on Košljun, a tiny island near Krk. He fought on Italian Front in Tirol and Duchy of Styria. After World War I, in 1920, he deserted and escape to Dubrovnik where he took the name Ambroz.

He lived two years in Cavtat monastery, where he learned painting from Vlaho Bukovac, famous Croatian painter who had his workroom there.

He also learned watercolor painting from Maksimilijan Vanka. In 1929 he moved to Pelješac, where he got to know Celestin Medović.

From 1939 to 1961 he lived in a monastery on island Krapanj then in St. Bernardine monastery in Kampor on island Rab where he painted a lot of his famous works. Since 1989. there is a permanent exhibition of his works there. After World War II, he shortly lived in Šibenik.

He died in Zadar on 7 January 1984.
