= Topole, Mengeš =

Topole
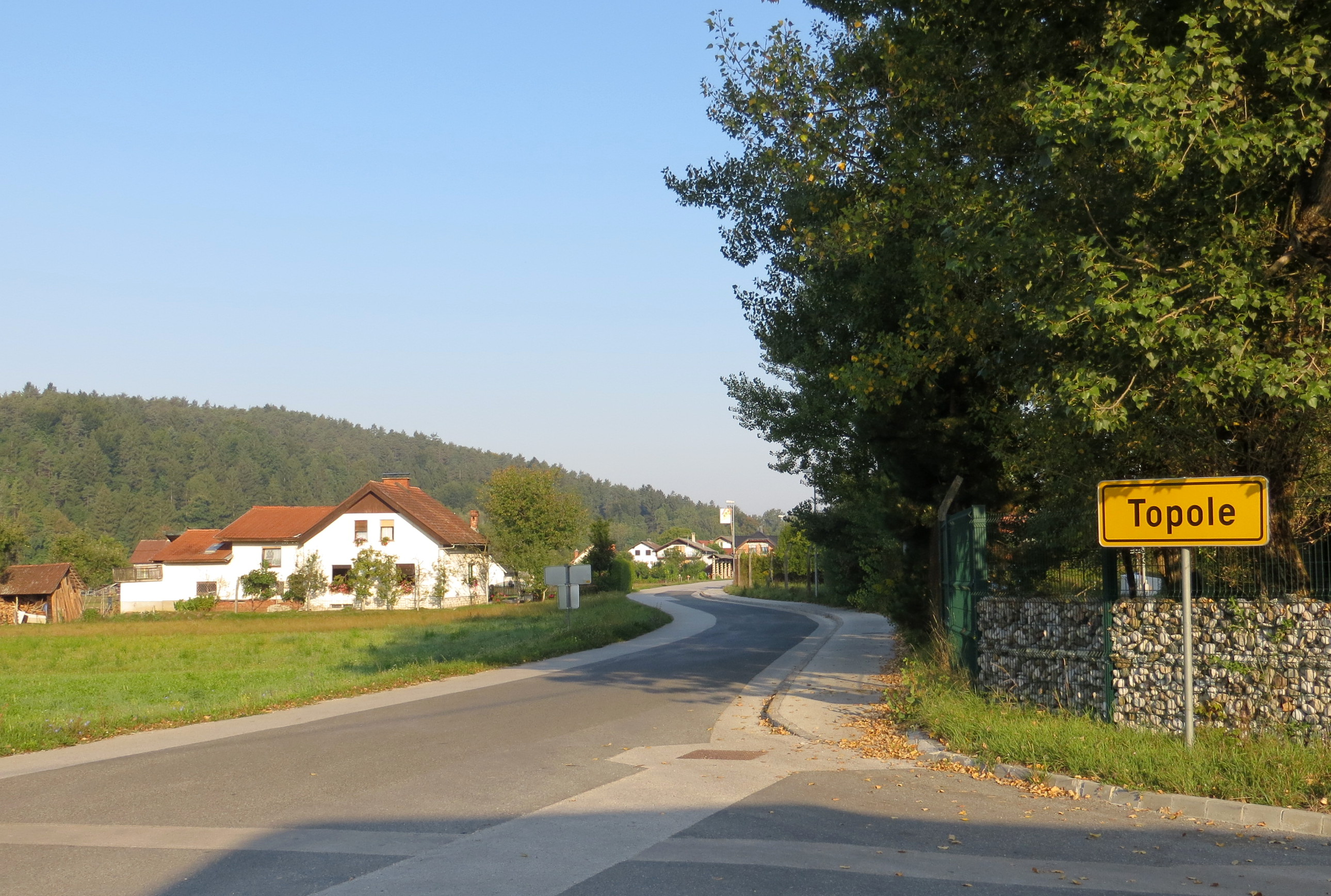

- Location in Slovenia
- Coordinates: 46°10′42.47″N 14°33′22.96″E
- Country: Slovenia
- Traditional region: Upper Carniola
- Statistical region: Central Slovenia
- Municipality: Mengeš

Area
  - Total: 2.11 km^{2} (0.81 sq mi)
- Elevation: 325.9 m (1,069 ft)

Population (2002)
  - Total: 201

Topole (pronounced [tɔˈpɔːlɛ]) is a settlement in the Municipality of Mengeš in the Upper Carniola region of Slovenia.
