= Janez Trdina =

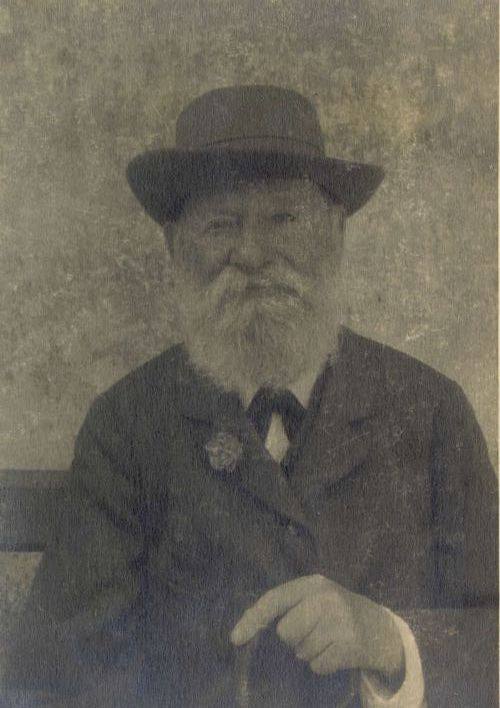
- Born: 29 May 1830; Mengeš, Austrian Empire (now Slovenia)
- Died: 14 July 1905 (aged 75); Novo Mesto, Austria-Hungary (now Slovenia)
- Occupation: Writer
- Writing career
- Notable works: Tales and Legends of the Gorjanci Mountains (1882)

Janez Trdina (29 May 1830 – 14 July 1905) was a Slovene writer and historian. The renowned author Ivan Cankar described him as the best Slovene stylist of his period. He was an ardent describer of the Gorjanci Mountains and of the Lower Carniolan region of Slovenia. Trdina Peak (Slovene: Trdinov vrh, Croatian: Sveta Gera), the highest peak of Gorjanci Mountains, situated on the border between southeastern Slovenia and Croatia, was named for him in 1923.

== Biography ==
Trdina was born in Mengeš in the northern Carniola, then part of the Austrian Empire. He attended school in Ljubljana and studied history, geography, and Slavic philology in Vienna. He worked as a teacher in Croatia, in Varaždin and in Rijeka. In 1867, he was retired on charges of misleading students with his radical liberal political views. He moved to Bršljin near Novo Mesto, and later to the town itself.

== Work ==
Trdina travelled widely across the Lower Carniola, compiling notes on the life and customs of local people. His notebooks were filled with folk sayings, folk tales, anecdotes, and customs. Trdina edited them in an emphasized realistic, even naturalistic manner, rejecting the Romantic vision of an idyllic countryside. In 1882, he published these notes in a volume titled Bajke in povesti o Gorjancih (Tales and Stories of the Gorjanci Mountains).
