= Jablje Castle =

- Loka pri Mengšu, Slovenia
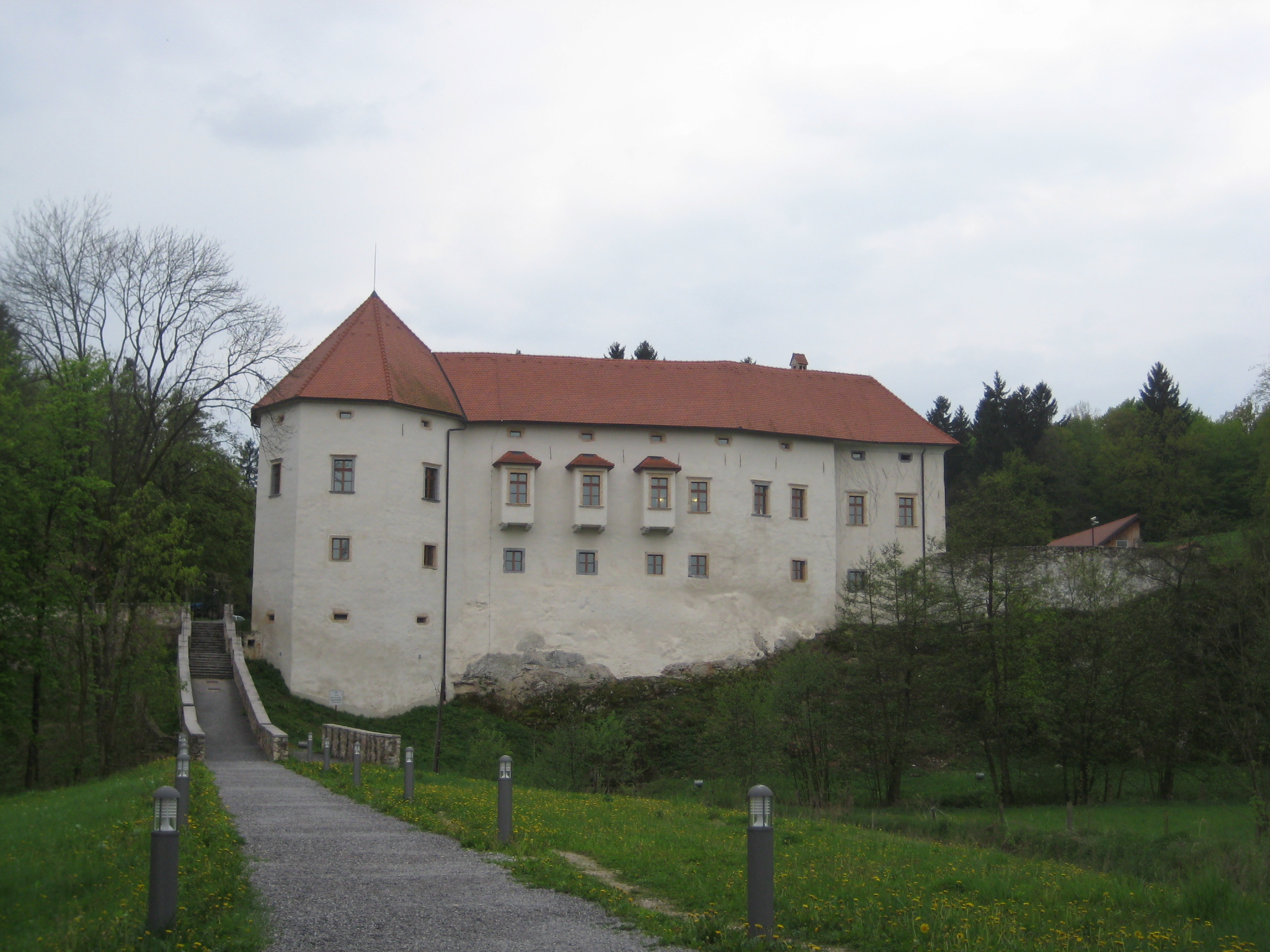
- Jablje Castle

Site information
- Open to the public: Yes
- Condition: Good

Location
- Coordinates: 46°8′31.52″N 14°33′13.04″E

Site history
- Built: House of Lamberg
- Materials: Limestone

Jablje Castle (Slovene: Grad Jablje), also known as Jable Castle (Slovene: Grad Jable), Habah Castle (Slovene: Grad Habah), or Habach Castle (Slovene: Grad Habach, German: Schloss Habach), is a castle above the settlement of Loka pri Mengšu, Slovenia. It is located on the western edge of the Mengeš Plain.

== History ==
The original castle at Jablje was first mentioned in 1268, while the current structure was built by the noble house of Lamberg around 1530. The castle subsequently passed through the hands of the Rasp family, the barons Mosconi, and was from 1780 until the end of World War II owned by the barons Lichtenberg. Though it survived the war largely intact, the castle was nationalized and thoroughly looted during the following years, being first converted into apartments and then serving as an experimental facility of the Biotechnical Faculty of the University of Ljubljana.

After a thorough renovation carried out between 1999 and 2006, the castle was a major protocolary site during the 2008 Slovene presidency of the EU. Today it hosts the so-called Center for European Perspective (Center za evropsko prihodnost or CEP; literally, 'Center for a European Future') and is listed as a cultural monument. Its greatest asset is a set of frescoes by the baroque painter Franc Jelovšek, including an unusual depiction of a camel-riding Chinese tambourine player.

The castle is open for visitors every other Saturday at 11:00, with appointments available for groups.

== Name ==
The castle was first attested in German as Hagbach and Hagwach (both in the 1320s), and then as Hawach (in 1348) and Habach (in 1435). The German name refers to a creek overgrown with bushes. The Slovene name was cited by Johann Weikhard von Valvasor in the 17th century as Ablah. Older theories explain the Slovene name Jablje as derived from German Habach (deriving this from the common noun Habicht 'northern goshawk' (Accipiter gentilis), a species said to be common in the area). More recent explanations reject this, stating that the name arose independently in Slovene, originally as Jable (and then through hypercorrection to Jablje) based on the root jabel 'apple tree'.

== See also ==
- List of castles in Slovenia
