= Dobeno, Mengeš =

Dobeno
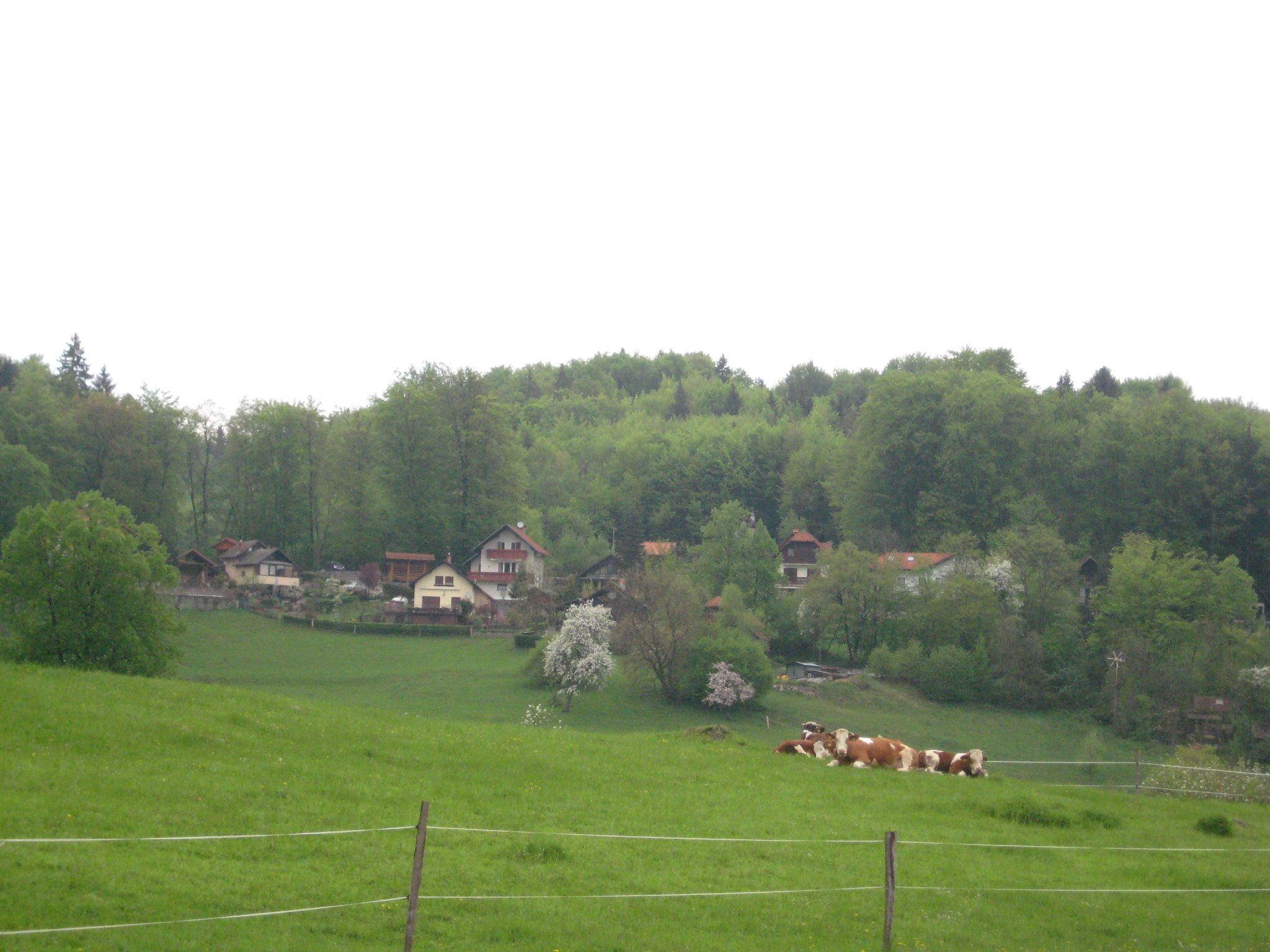

- Location in Slovenia
- Coordinates: 46°8′18.25″N 14°31′40.67″E
- Country: Slovenia
- Traditional region: Upper Carniola
- Statistical region: Central Slovenia
- Municipality: Mengeš

Area
  - Total: 1.81 km^{2} (0.70 sq mi)
- Elevation: 510.5 m (1,675 ft)

Population (2002)
  - Total: 109

Dobeno (pronounced [dɔˈbɛːnɔ]) is a settlement in the Municipality of Mengeš in the Upper Carniola region of Slovenia.
