= Malo Mraševo =

- Location in Slovenia
- Coordinates: 45°52′11.67″N 15°26′46.69″E
- Country: Slovenia
- Traditional region: Lower Carniola
- Statistical region: Lower Sava
- Municipality: Krško

Area
  - Total: 2.8 km^{2} (1.1 sq mi)
- Elevation: 151.6 m (497 ft)

Population (2002)
  - Total: 117
- Postal code: 8312

Malo Mraševo (pronounced [ˈmaːlɔ ˈmɾaːʃɛʋɔ]; German: Kleinmraschewo) is a village in the Municipality of Krško in eastern Slovenia. It lies in the flatlands on the right bank of the Krka River. The area is part of the traditional region of Lower Carniola. It is now included with the rest of the municipality in the Lower Sava Statistical Region.

There is a small church with a belfry in the settlement dedicated to Our Lady of Lourdes. It was built in the first quarter of the 20th century.Justina Hermina Pacek, (1931–2016) a Slovenian nurse, photographer, painter, and illustrator was born and lived in Malo Mraševo as a child.
