= Mengeš =

- Town
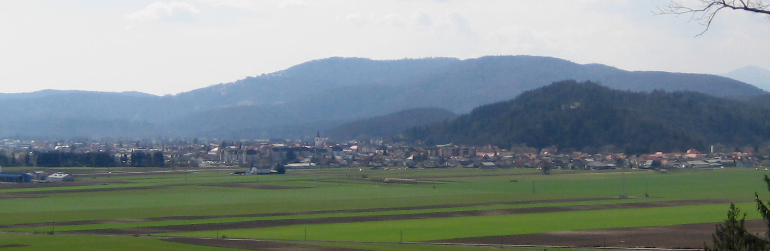
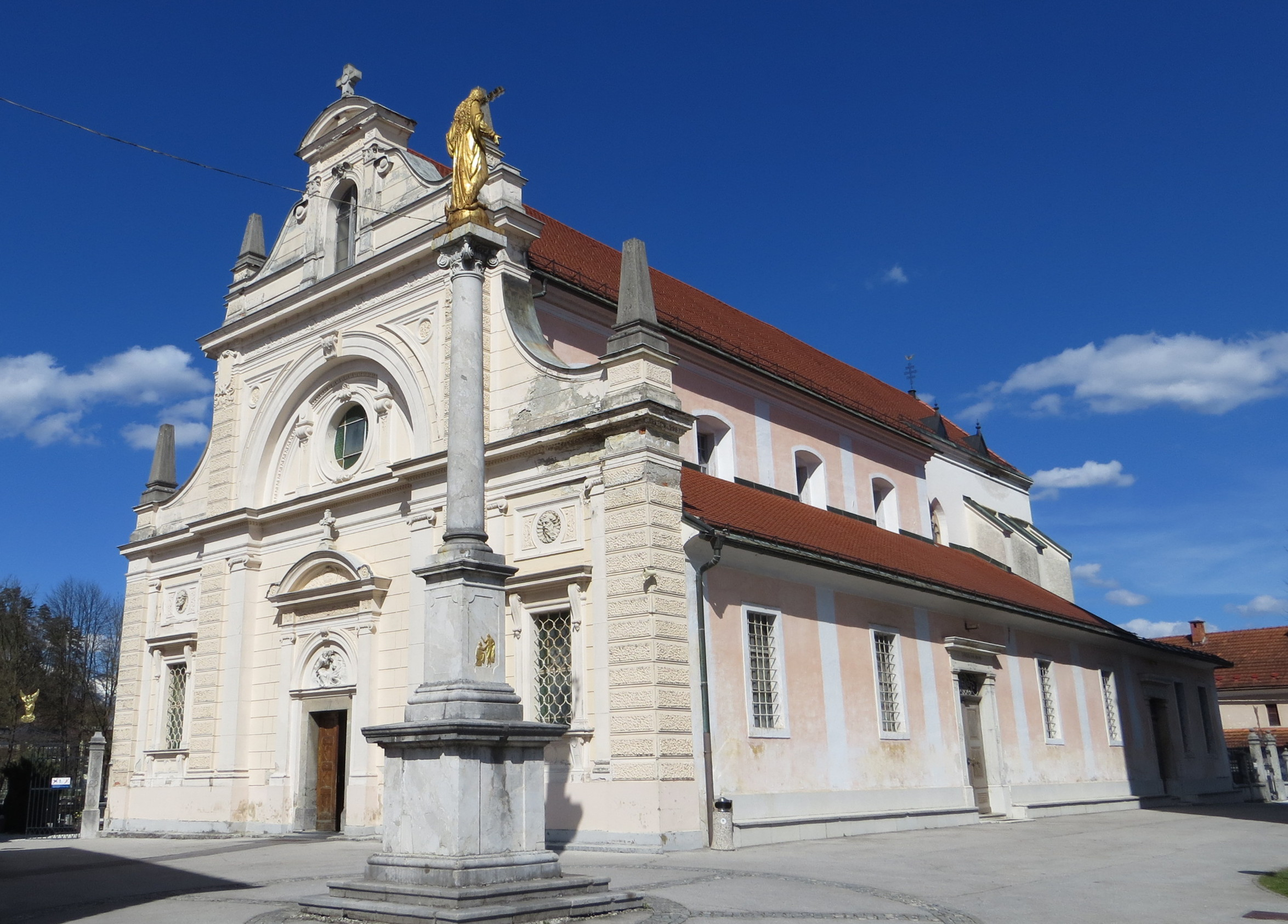
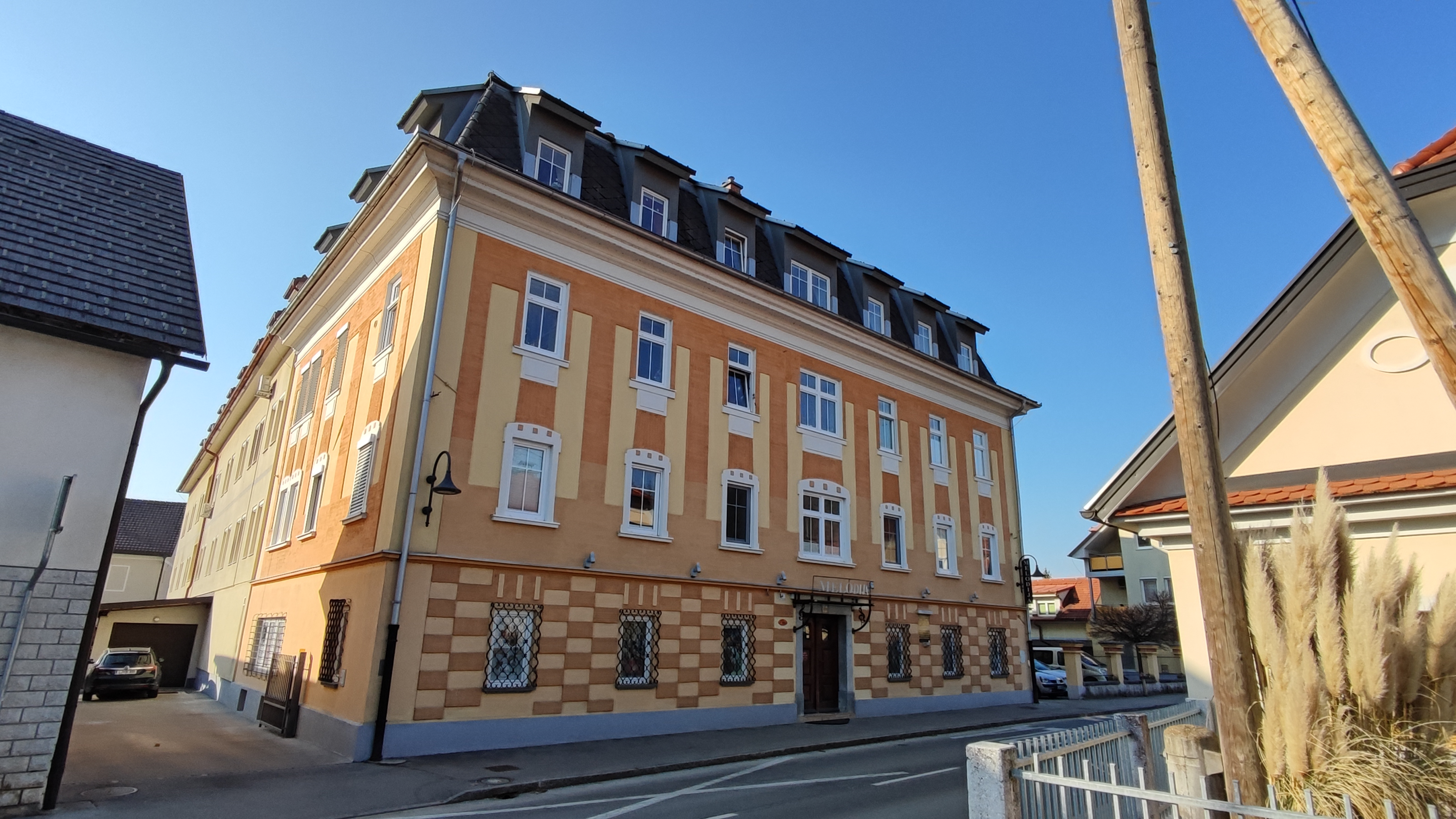
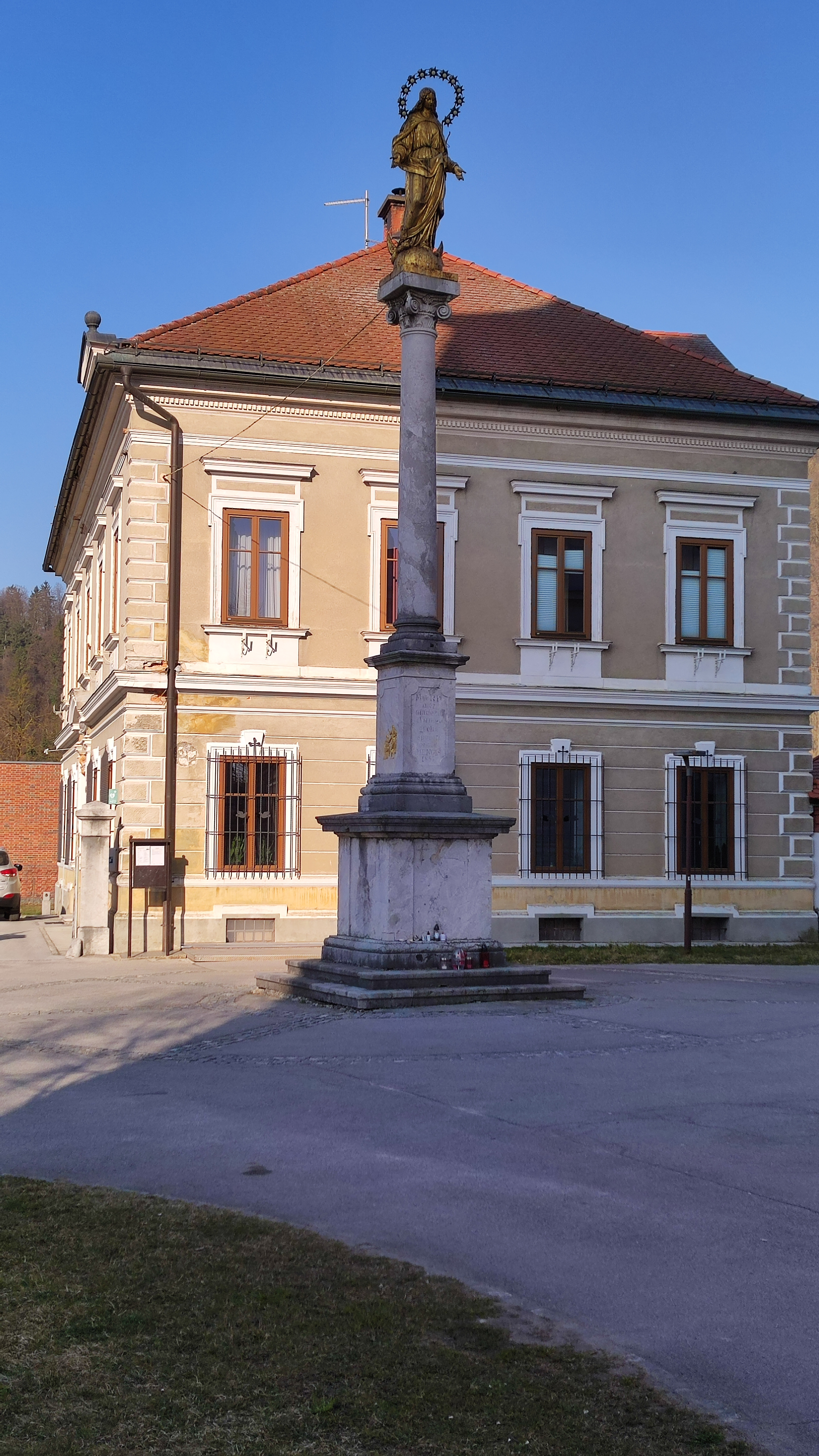
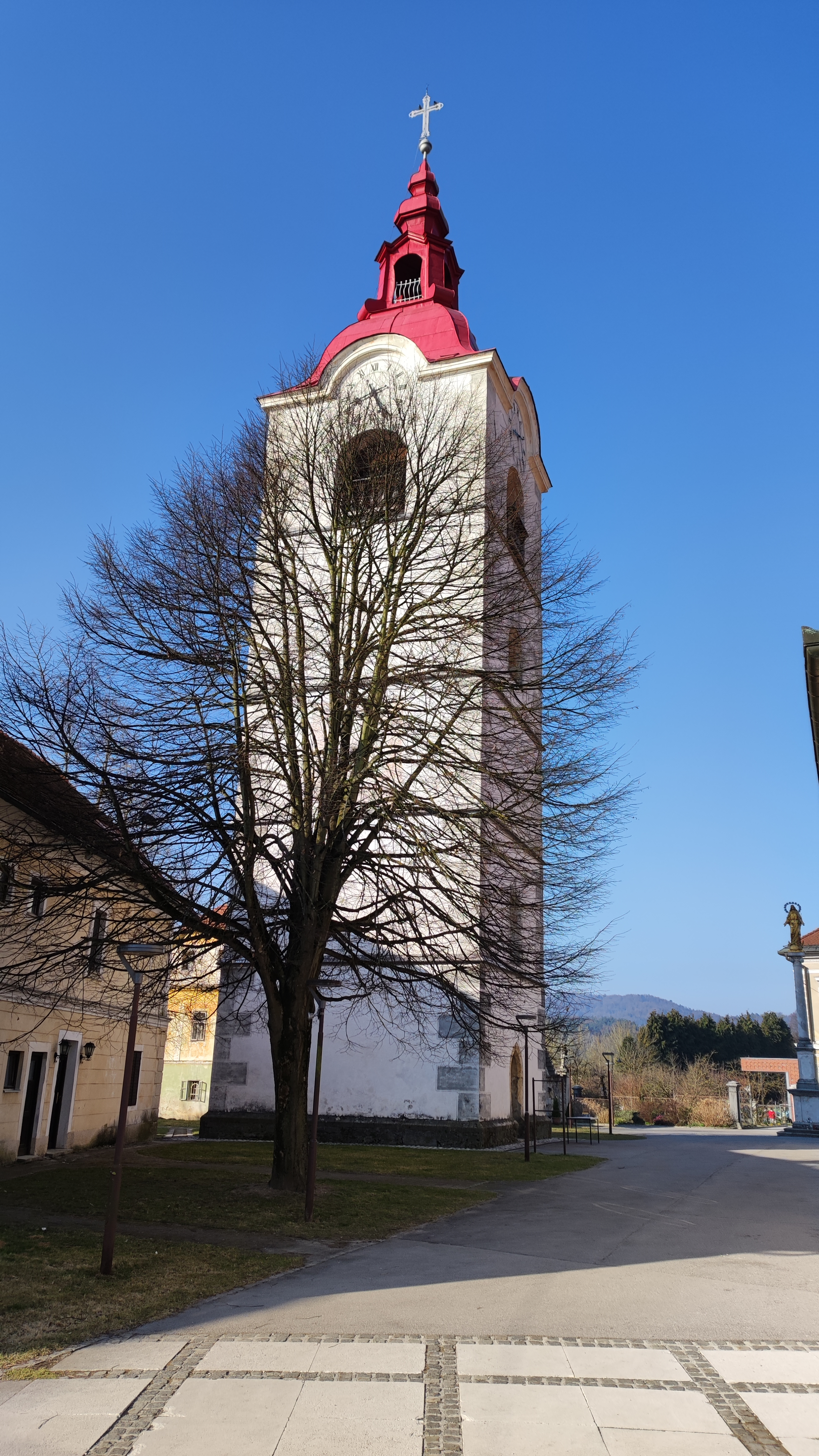
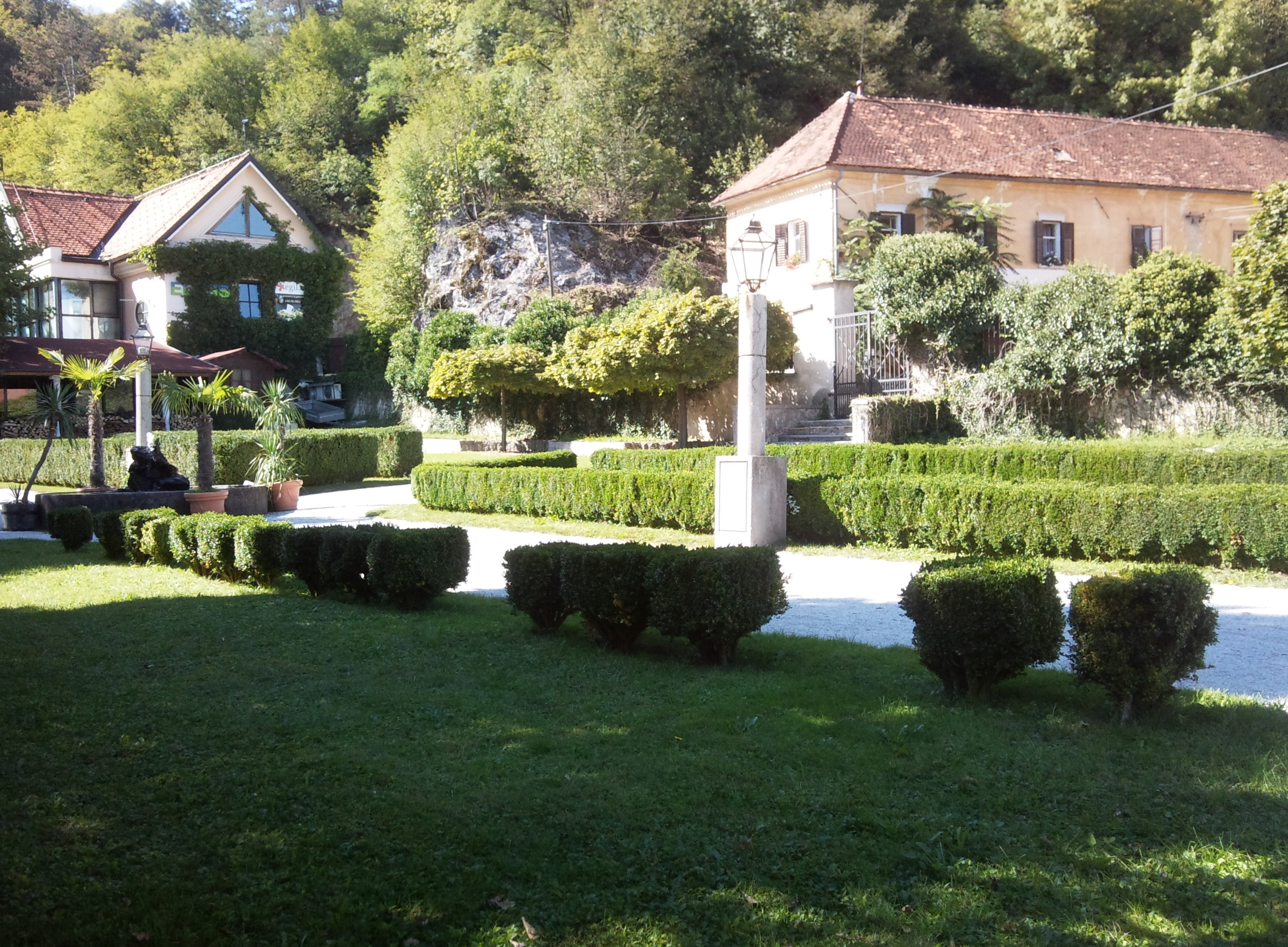
- From top, left to right: Overview of Mengeš, Archangel Michael Church, Former Melodija factory, St. Mary Column, Bell Tower, Park and the Castle

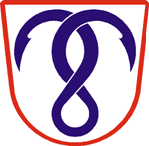
- Coat of arms

- Location in Slovenia
- Coordinates: 46°9′45.30″N 14°34′4.91″E
- Country: Slovenia
- Traditional region: Upper Carniola
- Statistical region: Central Slovenia
- Municipality: Mengeš

Area
  - Total: 13.3 km^{2} (5.1 sq mi)
- Elevation: 315.9 m (1,036 ft)

Population (2012)
  - Total: 6,119

Mengeš (pronounced [ˈmèːŋɡəʃ]; German: Mannsburg) is a town in the Upper Carniola region of Slovenia. It is the seat of the Municipality of Mengeš. It is located approximately fifteen kilometers from the Slovenian capital of Ljubljana. It includes the hamlets of Zavrti, Veliki Mengeš (German: Großmannsburg), Mali Mengeš (German: Kleinmannsburg), and Pristava.

== Name ==
Mengeš was first attested in written sources in 1154–56 as Meingosburg (and as Mengospurch in 1214–20, Mengozesburc in 1226, and Meingospurch in 1243). The Slovene name is a clipped form of Middle High German Meingos(purch), which is a compound of Meingoz (a personal name) + purch 'castle', thus meaning 'castle belonging to Meingoz'. In the past the German name was Mannsburg.

== Church ==
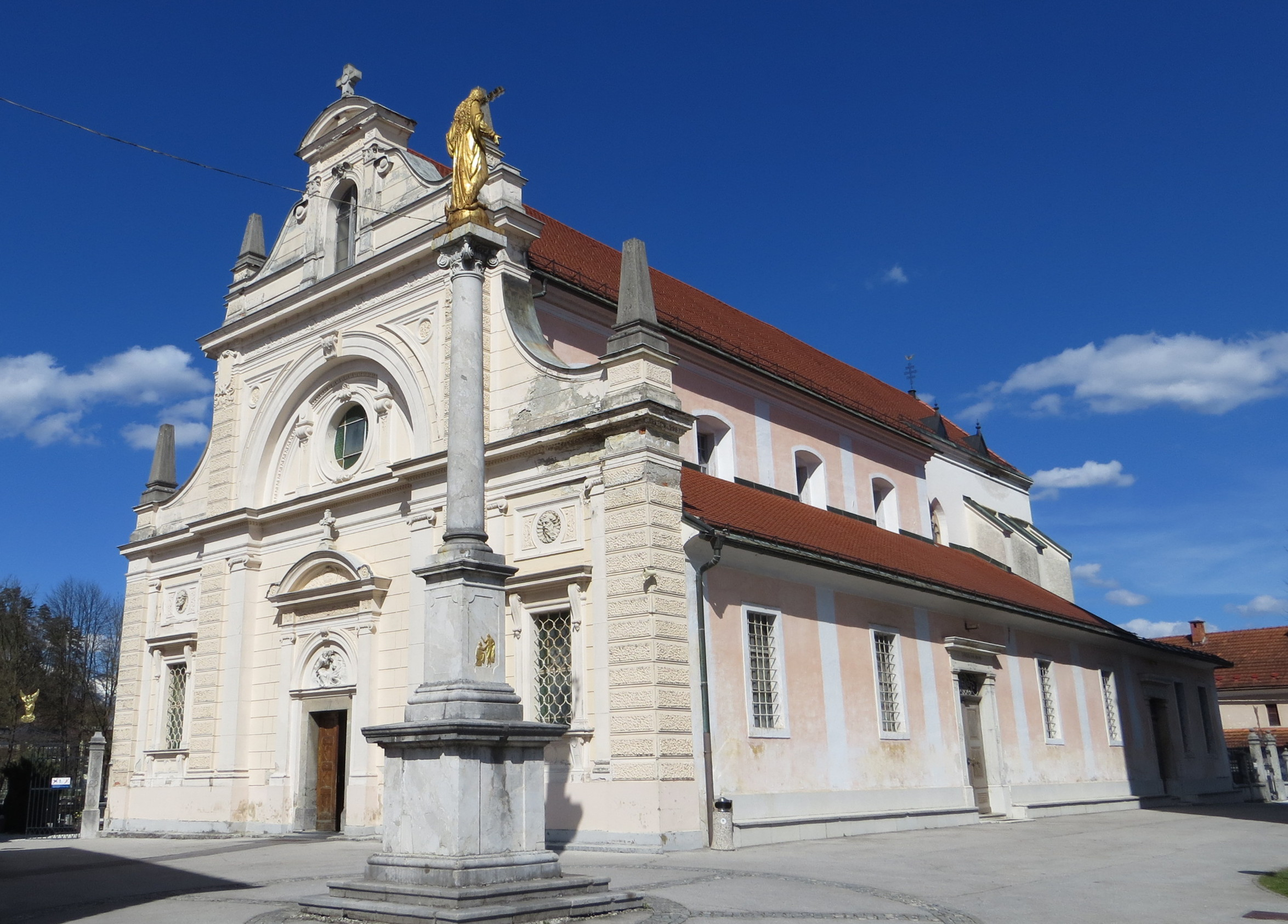
View from south

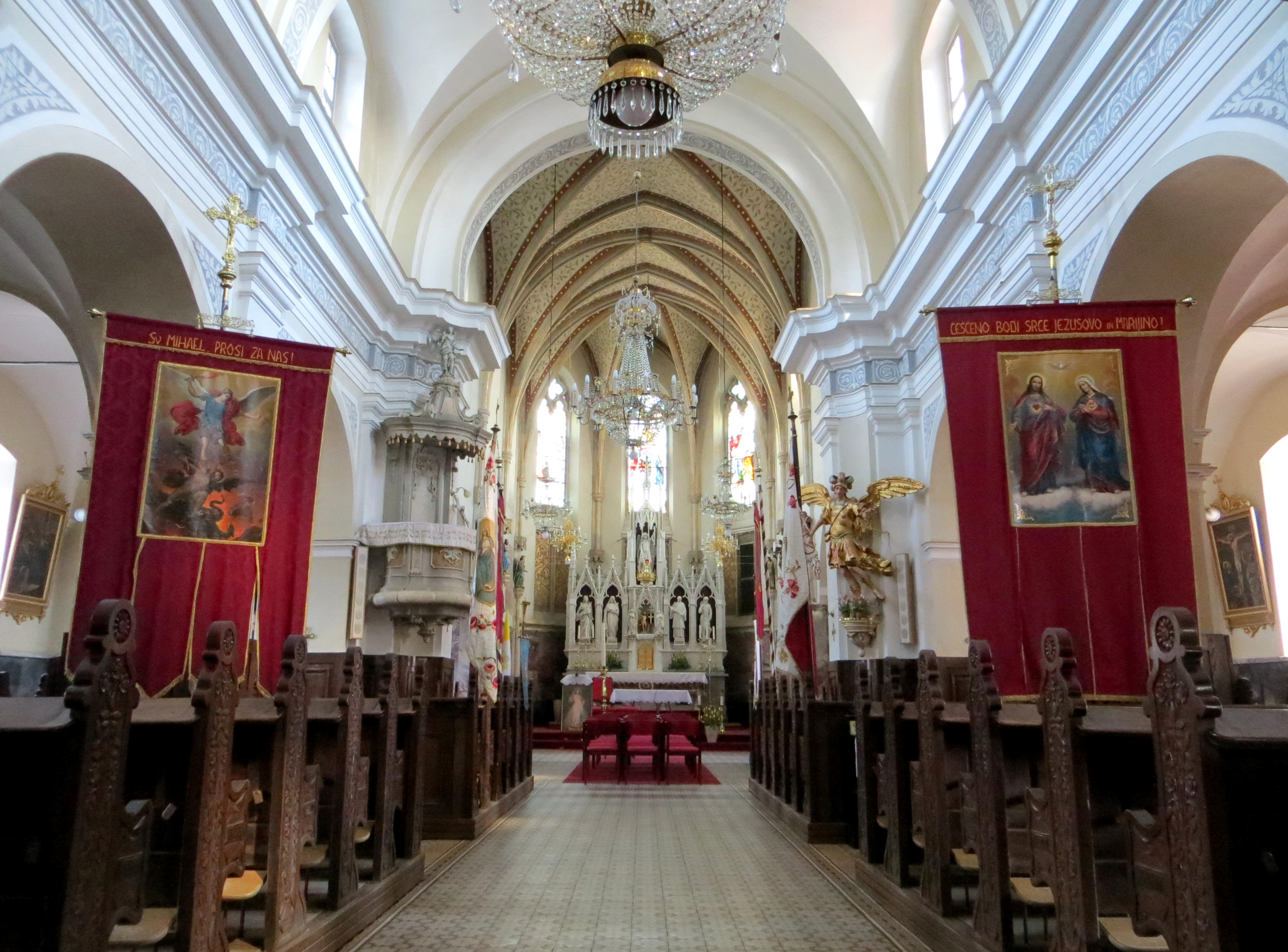
Church interior

Archangel Michael Church

The parish church in the town is dedicated to Archangel Michael.

== Notable people ==
Notable people that were born or lived in Mengeš include:

- Ferdinand Augustin Hallerstein (1703–1774), astronomer, mathematician
- Janez Trdina (1830–1905) writer, historian
- Jurij Andrej Gallenfels (1651–1699), Renaissance humanist
- Ignac Holzapfel (1799–1868), poet
- Anton Koblar (1854–1928), historian
- Franc Lah (1816–1890), sculptor
- Lovro Letnar (1855–1913), schoolmaster
- Anton Mrkun (1876–1961), priest and historian
- Franc Ropret (1878–1952), sculptor
- Miha Stare (1790–1872), businessman
- Justina Hermina Pacek (1931–2016), a nurse, photographer, painter, and illustrator
  Historical population
  Year	Pop.	±%
  1948	2,115	—
  1953	2,242	+6.0%
  1961	2,766	+23.4%
  1971	3,240	+17.1%
  1981	4,193	+29.4%
  1991	5,200	+24.0%
  2002	5,557	+6.9%
  2011	6,112	+10.0%
  2021	7,010	+14.7%
  Population size may be affected by changes in administrative divisions.

== Gallery ==
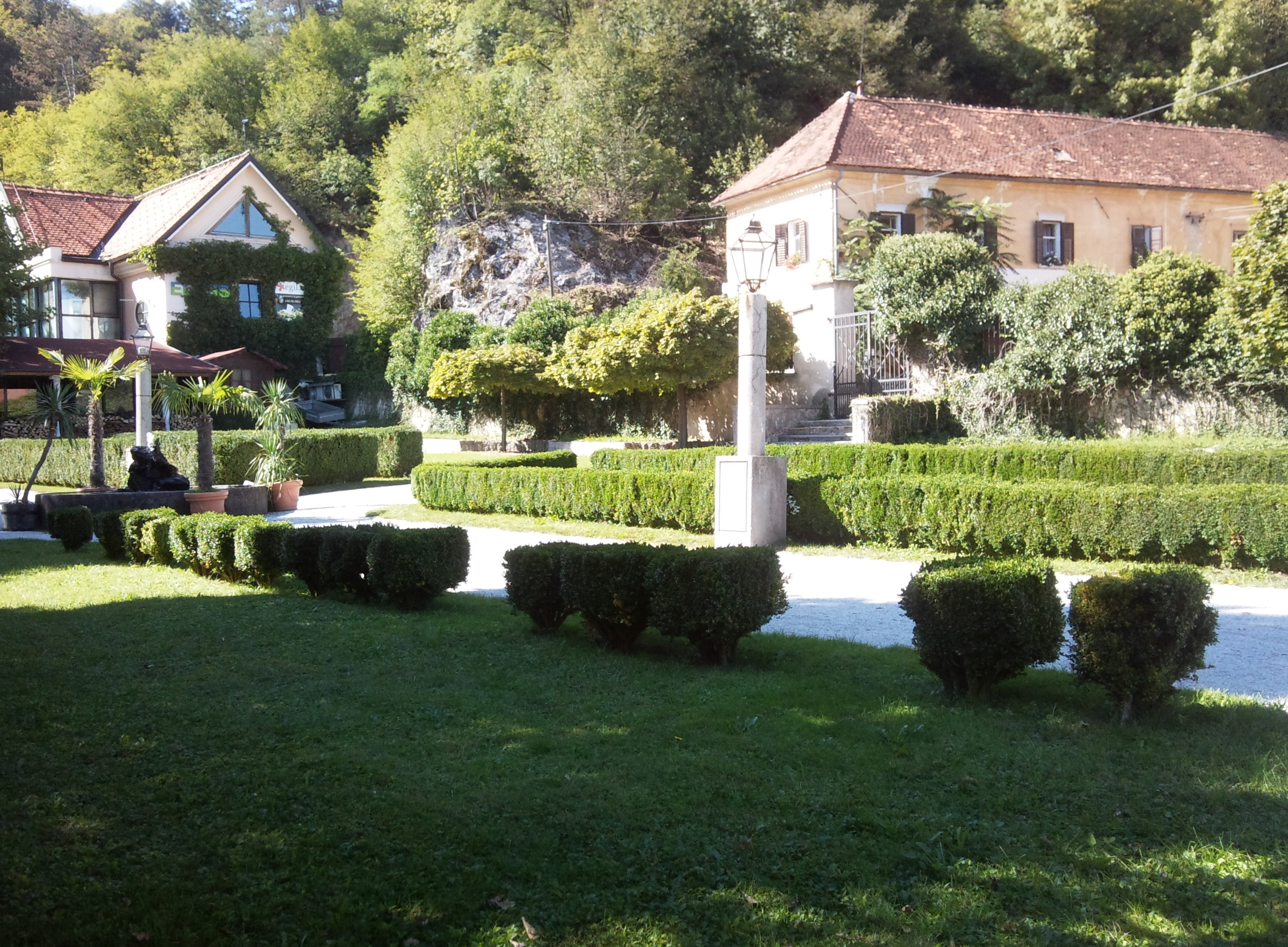
Park with castle on the right
