= Bršljin =

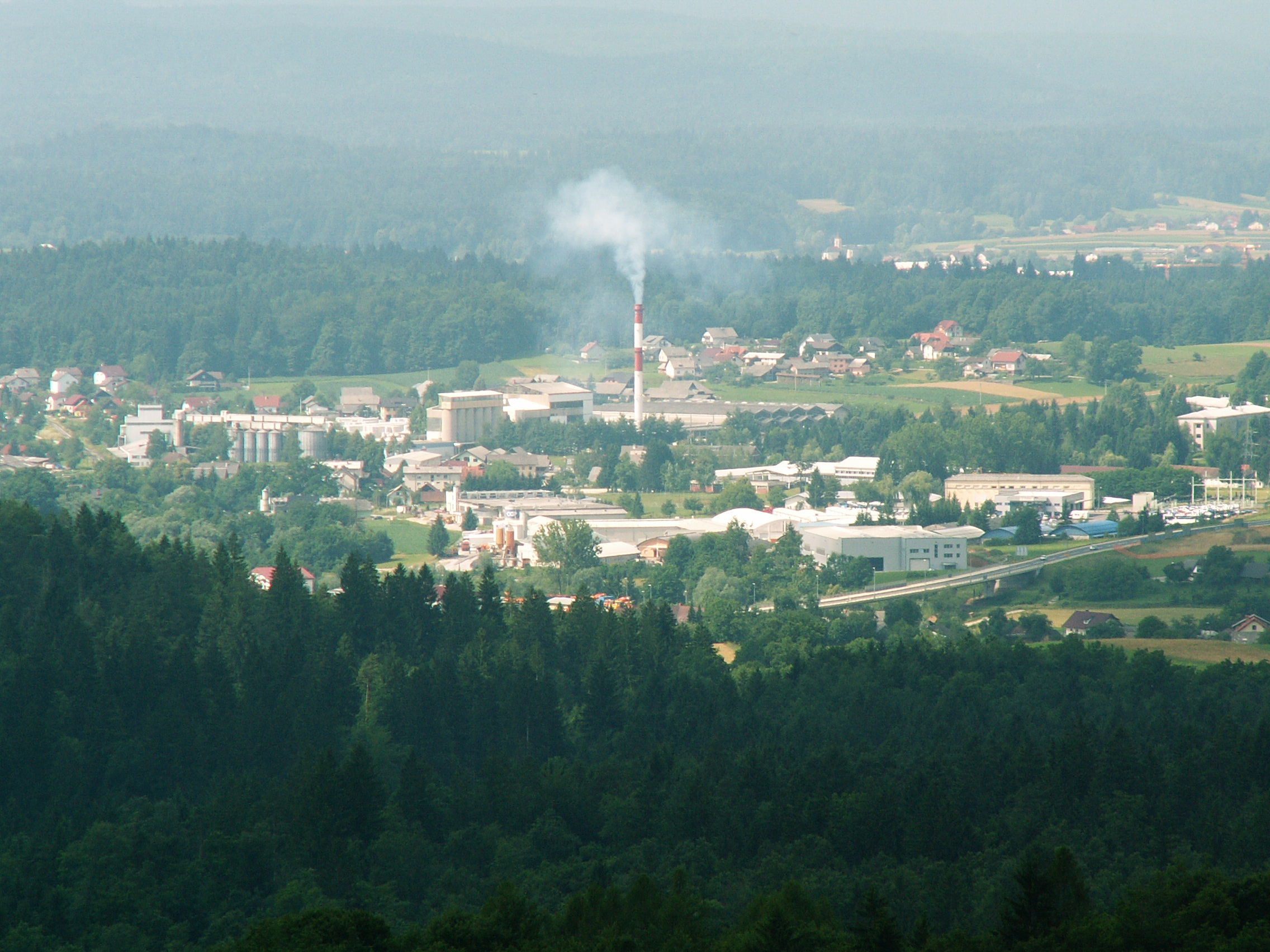
- Bršljin from Trška Gora

- Location in Slovenia
- Coordinates: 45°48′54″N 15°8′50″E
- Country: Slovenia
- Traditional region: Lower Carniola
- Statistical region: Southwest Slovenia
- Municipality: Novo Mesto
- Elevation: 170 m (560 ft)

Bršljin (pronounced [bəɾˈʃlin], in older sources also Beršlin, German: Werschlin) is a former village in southeastern Slovenia in the Municipality of Novo Mesto. It is now part of the city of Novo Mesto. It is part of the traditional region of Lower Carniola and is now included in the Southeast Slovenia Statistical Region.

== Geography ==
Bršljin is located northwest of the city center of Novo Mesto. It stands on a terrace above Bršljin Creek (Slovene: Bršljinski potok), which flows through a deep ravine, and on the northeast slope of Žabjak Hill. The old main road from Novo Mesto to Ljubljana passes through Bršljin, with a connection that branches off to Prečna. Cultivated land has mostly been built up by construction.

== Name ==
Bršljin was attested in historical sources as Verschlaven in 1330, Freschlawn in 1365, and Bershlin in 1453, among other variations. The name Bršljin is derived from the common noun bršljan 'ivy', referring to the local vegetation. Locally, the name is pronounced Bršlin; the standard spelling Bršljin is a hypercorrection based on the plant name. Other toponyms based on the same root include Bršljan Hill (763 meters or 2,503 feet) in Zavrh pri Borovnici, Bršljanovec Hill (939 meters or 3,081 feet) in Trnje, and the Bršljanovca Woods in Gozd.

== History ==
A burial ground with urn graves was excavated in Bršljin near the Inis glass company, testifying to early settlement of the area, and Roman graves have also been found nearby. Bršljin was first mentioned in written records in the 14th century, when it was already a large enough settlement to be subdivided into three parts: "ze Nidern Freschlawn vnd ain mul ze dem andern Freschlawn, nevn huben ze dem dritten Freschlawn" (at lower Bršljin and a mill in the second Bršljin, nine farms in the third Bršljin). At that time, it was the Stična Abbey's largest holding in the Novo Mesto area. In 1365, the abbey granted six farms in the village and their land to Rudolf IV, Duke of Austria, who founded the town of Rudolfswerth (now Novo Mesto) at the site. In return, the abbey received land and farms in the parish of Šmarje, in the Trebnje Valley (Slovene: Trebanjska dolina), and elsewhere.

In 1809, during the time of the Illyrian Provinces, General Carlo Zucchi passed through Bršljin after putting down a rebellion in the Kočevje region. His troops were fired upon in Bršljin, and so he ordered the village plundered and burned. Bršljin underwent significant industrialization after the Second World War. Facilities for the construction company Pionir and the textile company Novoteks were built in 1947, an electrical substation was installed in 1961, a plant for the Iskra company was built in 1962, and a glass factory was opened in 1966. In 1952, auxiliary Bishop of Ljubljana Anton Vovk was doused with gasoline and set alight by secret police agents at the Bršljin train station.

Bršljin had a population of 139 in 29 houses in 1870, 134 in 28 houses in 1880, 127 in 24 houses in 1900, 194 in 35 houses in 1931, and 471 in 50 houses in 1961. Bršljin was annexed by the city of Novo Mesto in 1979, ending its existence as an independent settlement.

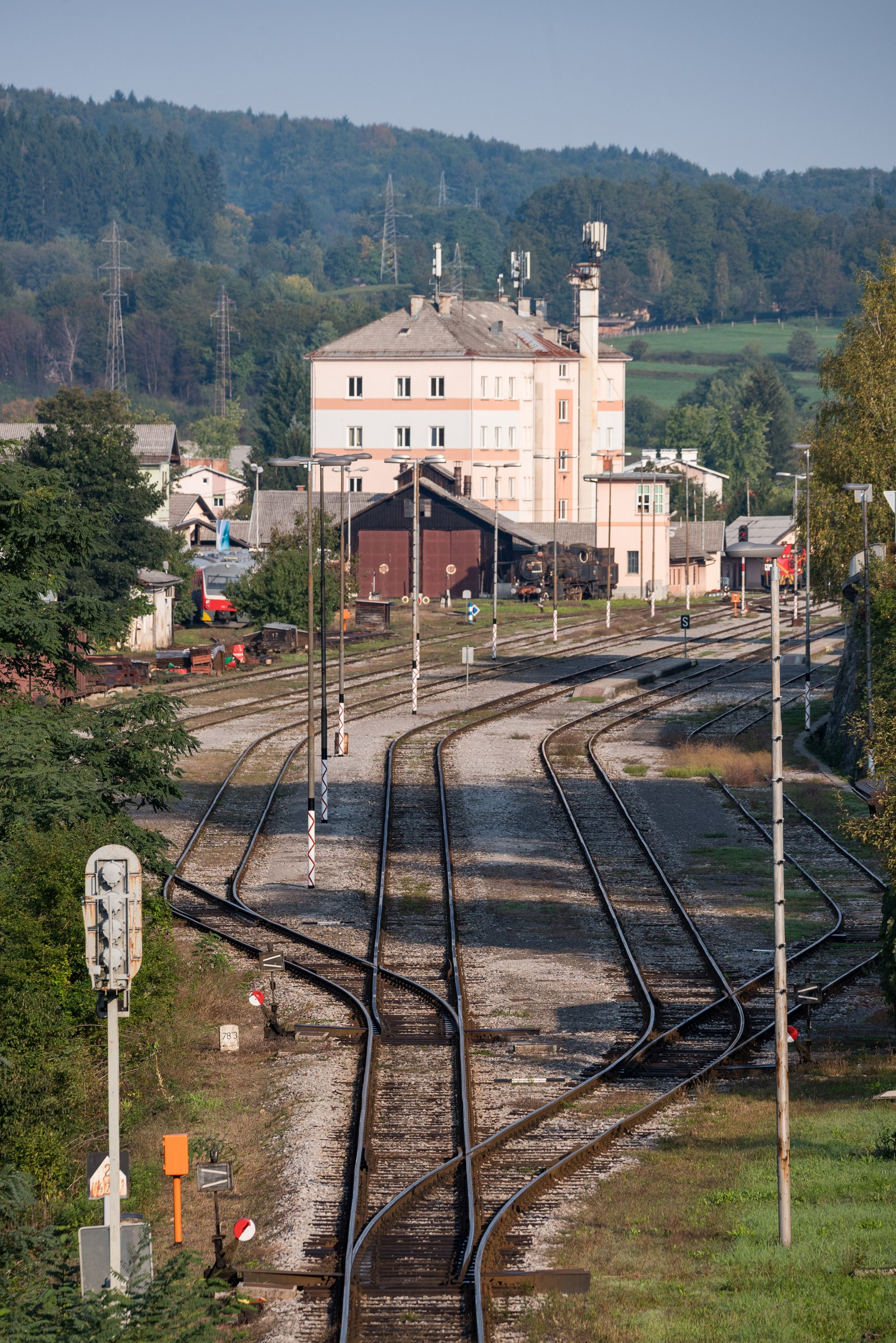
Bršljin train station

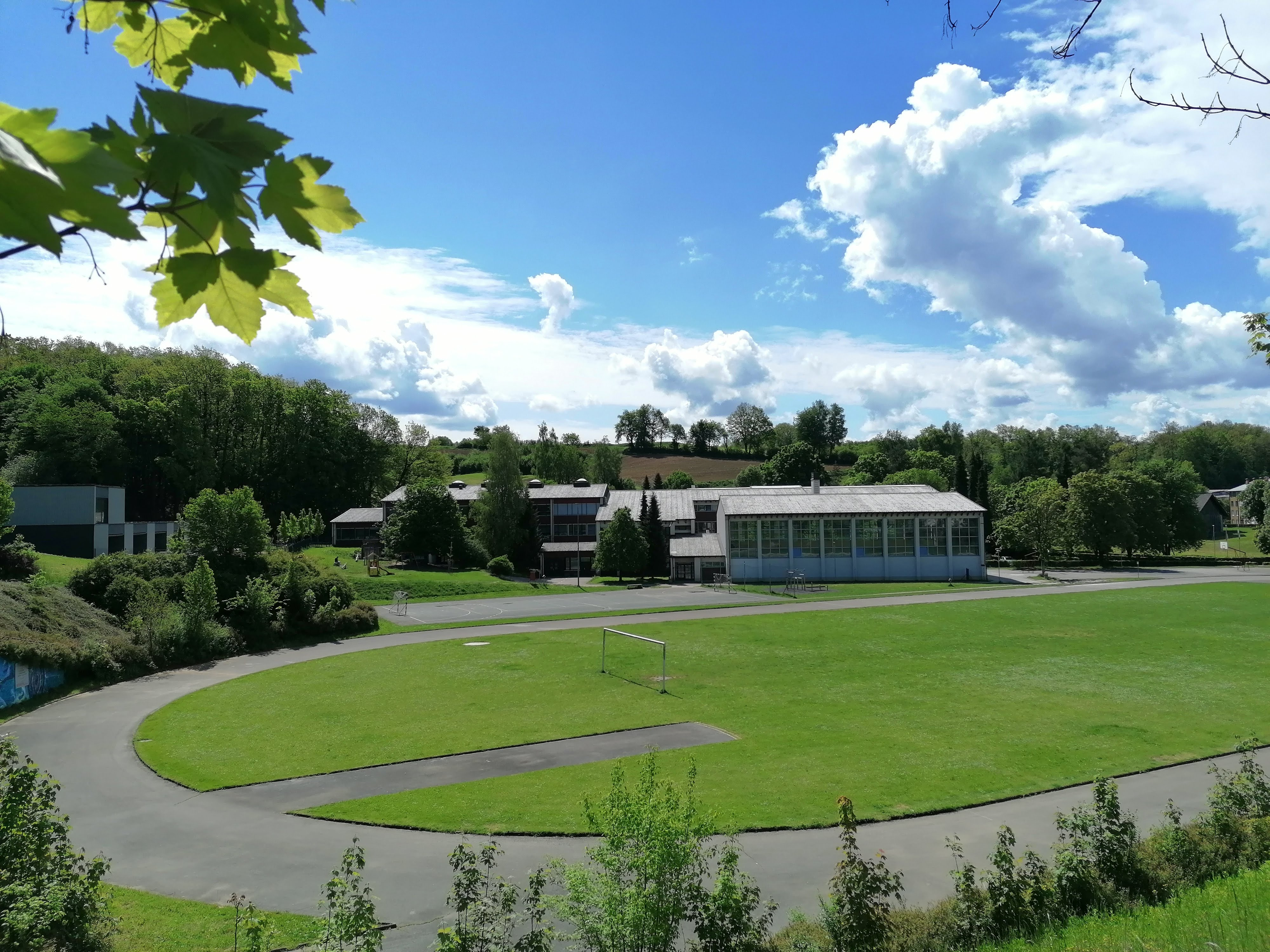
Bršljin Elementary School

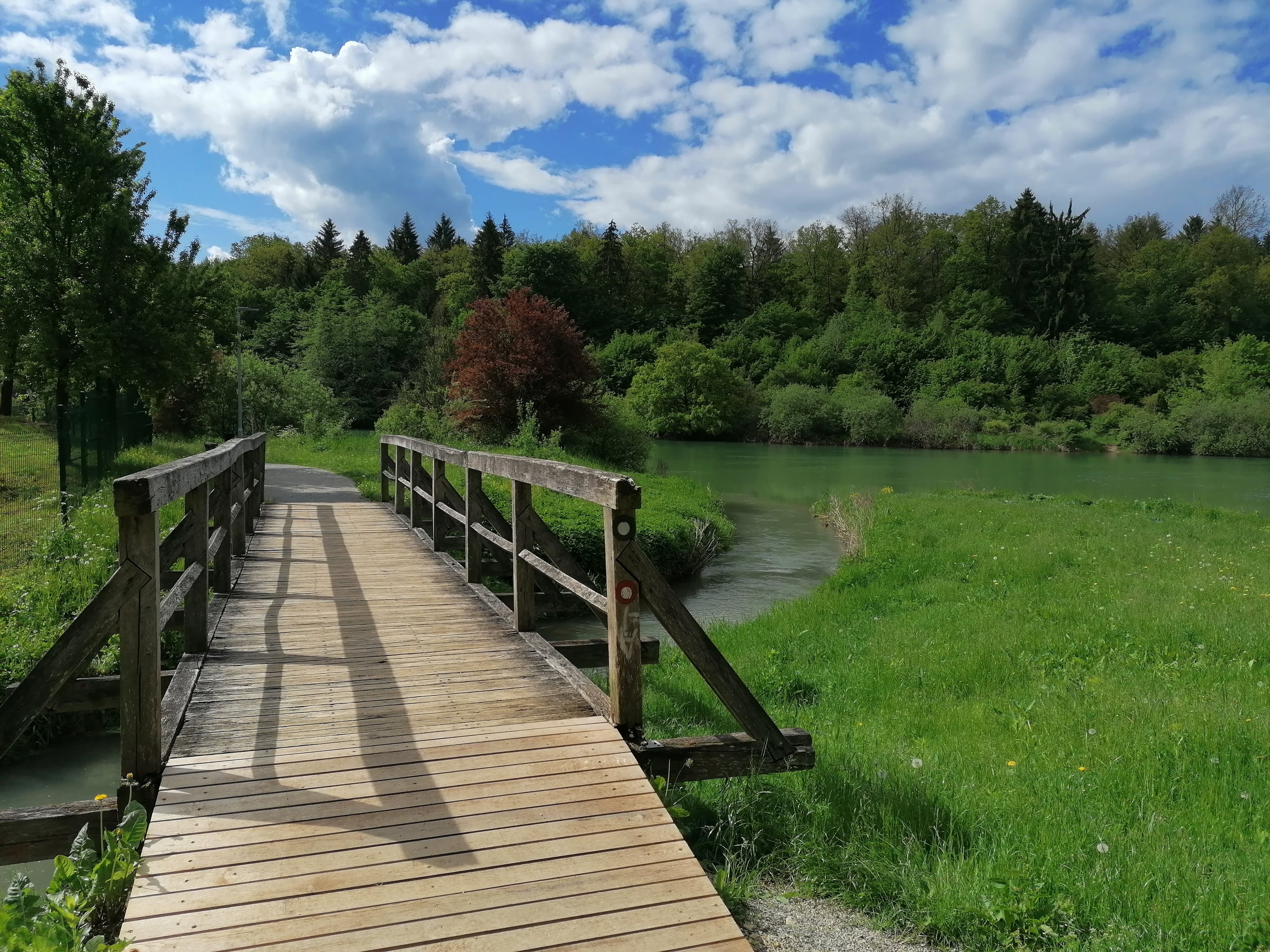
Bršljin Creek

== Notable people ==
Notable people that were born or lived in Bršljin include the following:

- Janez Trdina (1830–1905), writer, lived in Bršljin from 1867 to 1871
