= Loka pri Mengšu =

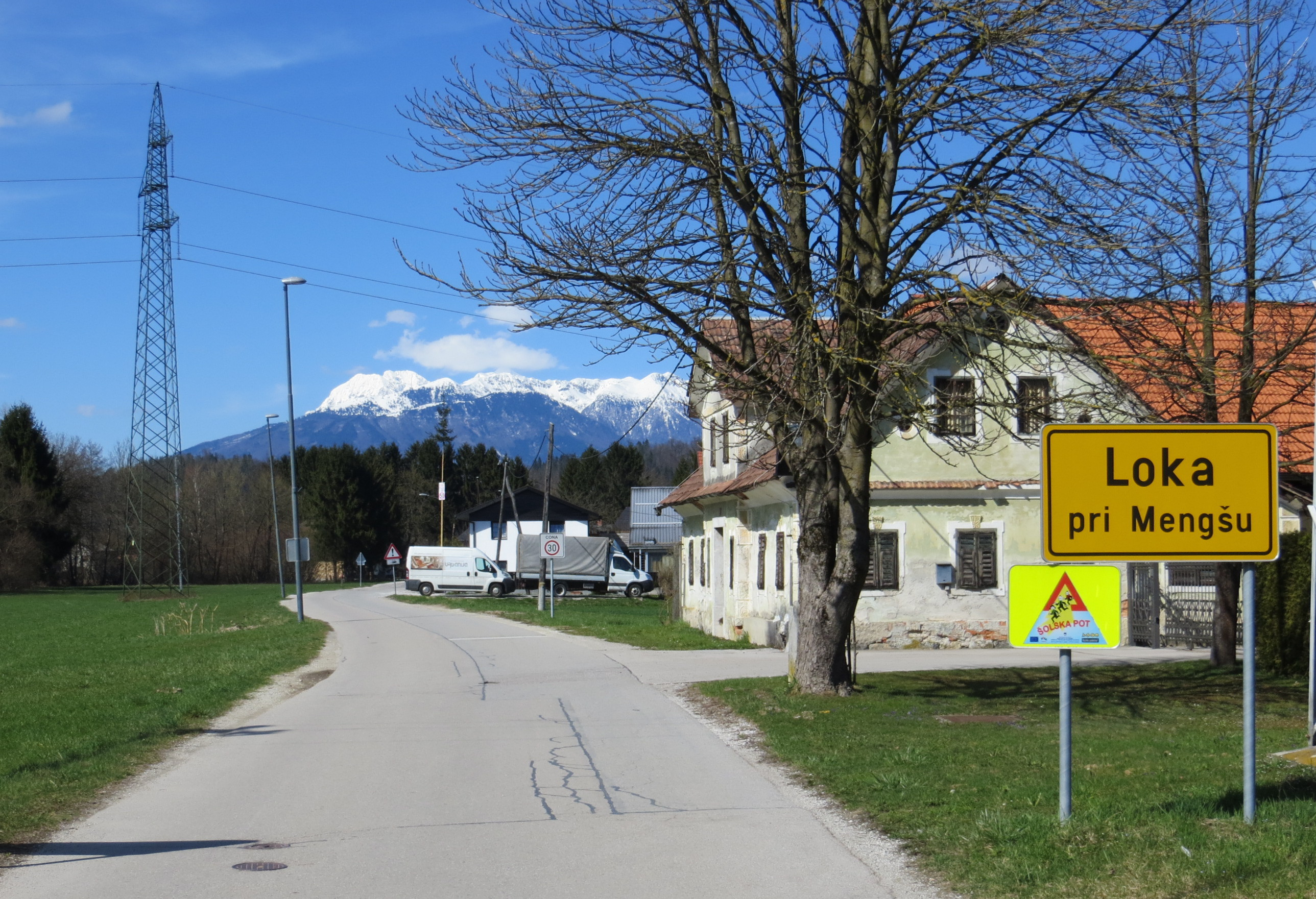

- Location in Slovenia
- Coordinates: 46°9′7.35″N 14°33′49.82″E
- Country: Slovenia
- Traditional region: Upper Carniola
- Statistical region: Central Slovenia
- Municipality: Mengeš

Area
  - Total: 5.23 km^{2} (2.02 sq mi)
- Elevation: 308.7 m (1,013 ft)

Population (2002)
  - Total: 795

Loka pri Mengšu (pronounced [ˈloːka pɾi ˈmeːŋɡʃu]; German: Laak bei Mannsburg) is a village in the Municipality of Mengeš in the Upper Carniola region of Slovenia.

== Church ==
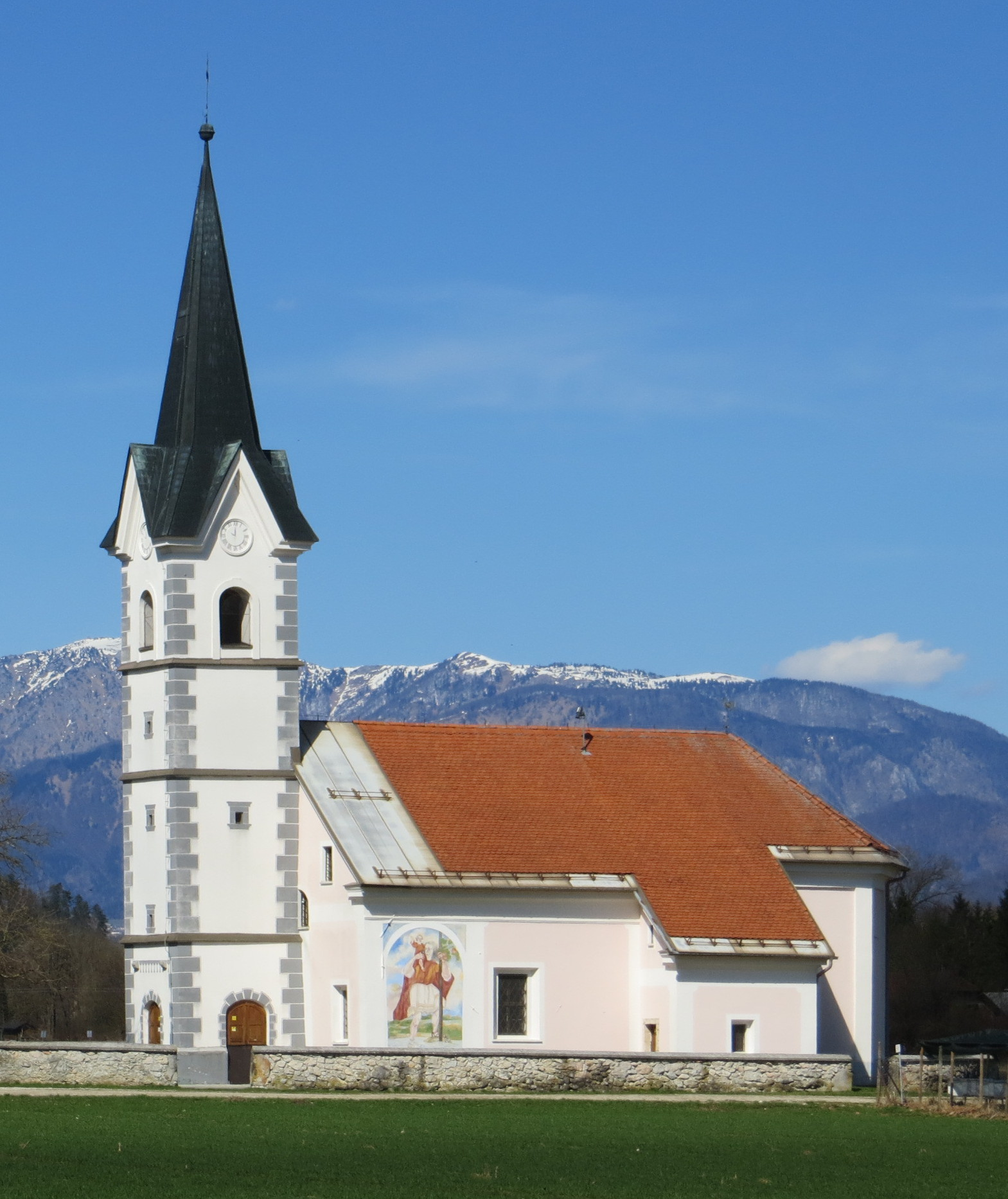
View from south

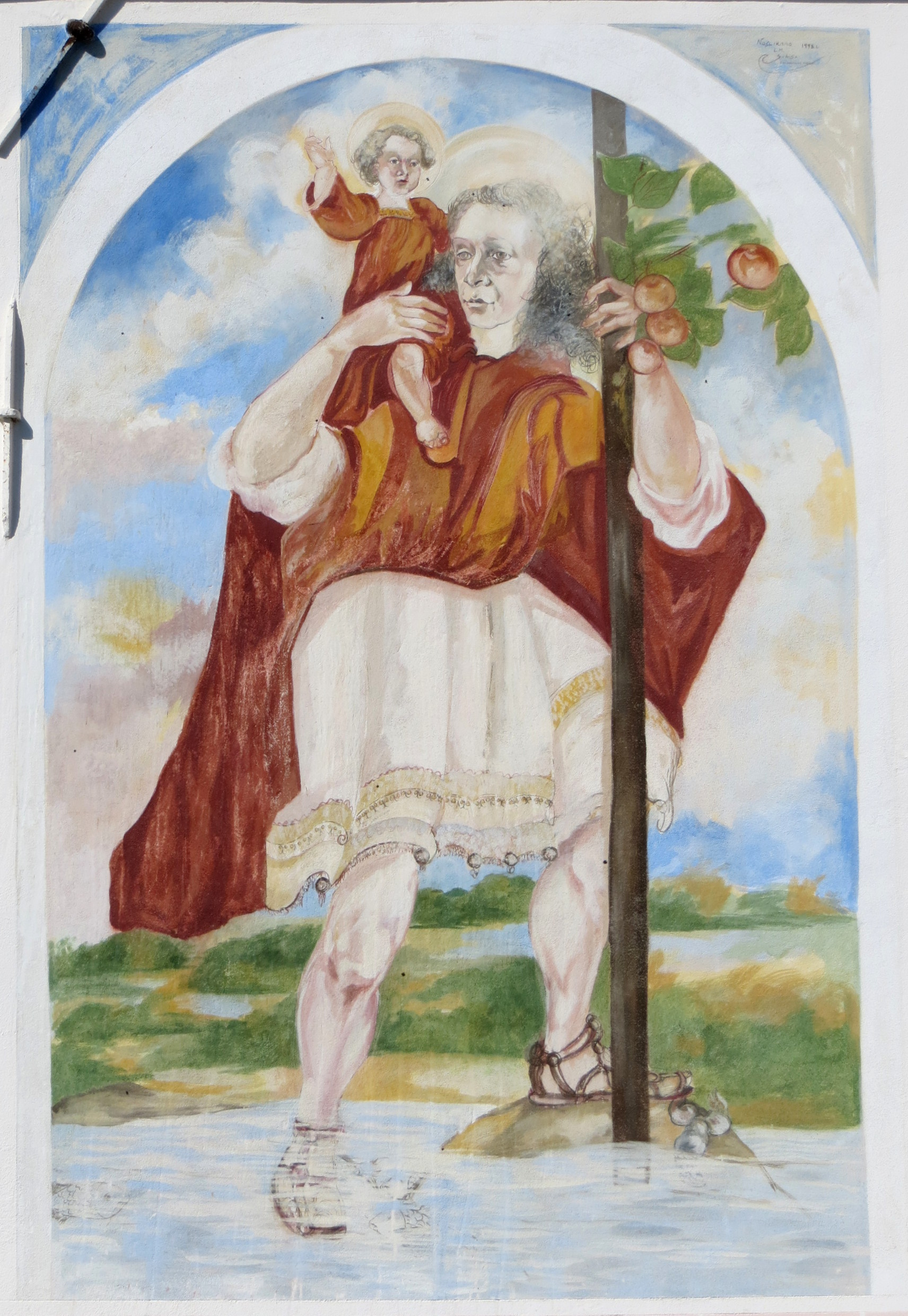
Exterior fresco

Saints Primus and Felician Church

The local church, standing isolated in a field outside the village, is dedicated to Saints Primus and Felician.

== Castle ==
The recently renovated Jablje Castle is southwest of the settlement.
