= Municipality of Mengeš =

Municipality of Slovenia

Municipality of Mengeš Občina Mengeš
- Municipality
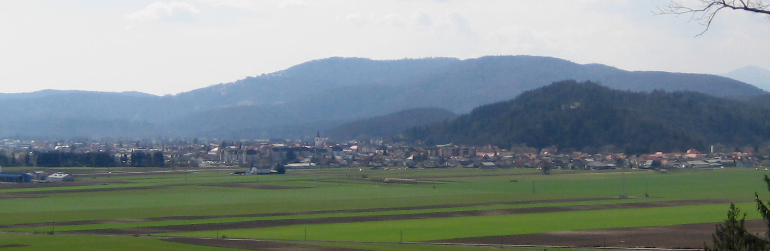

- Location of the Municipality of Mengeš in Slovenia
- Coordinates: 46°10′N 14°34′E
- Country: Slovenia

Government
  - Mayor: Bogo Ropotar

Area
  - Total: 22.5 km^{2} (8.7 sq mi)

Population (2012)
  - Total: 7,407
  - Density: 329/km^{2} (853/sq mi)
- Time zone: UTC+01 (CET)
  - Summer (DST): UTC+02 (CEST)
- Postal code: 1234
- Website: www.menges.si

The Municipality of Mengeš (pronounced [ˈmeːŋɡəʃ]; Slovene: Občina Mengeš) is a municipality in the eastern part of the traditional region of Upper Carniola in central Slovenia. The seat of the municipality is the town of Mengeš. It is located approximately fifteen kilometers from the Slovenian capital of Ljubljana. Mengeš became a municipality in 1995.

== Settlements ==
In addition to the municipal seat of Mengeš, the municipality also includes the settlements of Dobeno, Loka pri Mengšu, and Topole.
