= Rowing at the 1992 Summer Olympics – Men's coxless four =

Men's coxless four at the Games of the XXV Olympiad
- Date: 28 July – 2 August 1992
- Competitors: 56 from 14 nations

Medalists
1st place, gold medalist(s)		Andrew Cooper; Nick Green; Mike McKay; James Tomkins	Australia
2nd place, silver medalist(s)		Jeffrey McLaughlin; William Burden; Thomas Bohrer; Patrick Manning	United States
3rd place, bronze medalist(s)		Milan Janša; Sadik Mujkič; Sašo Mirjanič; Janez Klemenčič	Slovenia

The men's coxless four competition at the 1992 Summer Olympics took place at took place at Lake of Banyoles, Spain.

== Competition format ==
The competition consisted of three main rounds (heats, semifinals, and finals) as well as a repechage. The 14 boats were divided into three heats for the first round, with 4 or 5 boats in each heat. The top three boats in each heat (9 boats total) advanced directly to the semifinals. The remaining 5 boats were placed in the repechage. The repechage featured a single heat. The top three boats in the repechage advanced to the semifinals. The remaining two boats (4th and 5th place in the repechage) were placed in the "C" final to compete for 13th and 14th places.

The 12 semifinalist boats were divided into two heats of 6 boats each. The top three boats in each semifinal (6 boats total) advanced to the "A" final to compete for medals and 4th through 6th place; the bottom three boats in each semifinal were sent to the "B" final for 7th through 12th.

All races were over a 2000 metre course.

== Results ==
=== Heats ===
==== Heat 1 ====
Rank	Rowers	Nation	Time	Notes
1	Jeffrey McLaughlin; Doug Burden; Thomas Bohrer; Patrick Manning	United States	6:00.93	Q
2	Scott Brownlee; Chris White; Pat Peoples; Campbell Clayton-Greene	New Zealand	6:03.10	Q
3	Milan Janša; Sadik Mujkič; Sašo Mirjanič; Janez Klemenčič	Slovenia	6:04.91	Q
4	Jean-Pierre Le Lain; Patrick Vibert-Vichet; Bruno Dumay; Dominique Lecointe	France	6:15.23	R
5	Vasile Hanuseac; Nicolae Spîrcu; Florin Ene; Ioan Snep	Romania	6:24.63	R

==== Heat 2 ====
Rank	Rowers	Nation	Time	Notes
1	Andrew Cooper; Nick Green; Mike McKay; James Tomkins	Australia	5:59.18	Q
2	Bart Peters; Niels van der Zwan; Jaap Krijtenburg; Sven Schwarz	Netherlands	6:01.19	Q
3	Armin Weyrauch; Matthias Ungemach; Dirk Balster; Markus Vogt	Germany	6:09.07	Q
4	Salih Hassan; John Garrett; Gavin Stewart; Richard Stanhope	Great Britain	6:23.73	R
5	Vjatšeslav Divonin; Toomas Vilpart; Tarmo Virkus; Marek Avamere	Estonia	6:27.97	R

==== Heat 3 ====
Rank	Rowers	Nation	Time	Notes
1	Fernando Climent; José María de Marco; Juan Aguirre; Fernando Molina	Spain	6:01.51	Q
2	Luca Sartori; Rocco Pecoraro; Roby La Mura; Riccardo Dei Rossi	Italy	6:02.26	Q
3	Viktor Pitirimov; Roman Monchenko; Vladimir Sokolov; Vadim Yunash	Unified Team	6:02.84	Q
4	Don Telfer; Brian Saunderson; Cedric Burgers; Greg Stevenson	Canada	6:03.91	R

=== Repechage ===
Rank	Rowers	Nation	Time	Notes
1	Salih Hassan; John Garrett; Gavin Stewart; Richard Stanhope	Great Britain	6:12.68	Q
2	Don Telfer; Brian Saunderson; Cedric Burgers; Greg Stevenson	Canada	6:12.71	Q
3	Jean-Pierre Le Lain; Patrick Vibert-Vichet; Bruno Dumay; Dominique Lecointe	France	6:13.37	Q
4	Vasile Hanuseac; Nicolae Spîrcu; Florin Ene; Ioan Snep	Romania	6:16.13	QC
5	Vjatšeslav Divonin; Toomas Vilpart; Tarmo Virkus; Marek Avamere	Estonia	6:30.63	QC

=== Semifinals ===
==== Semifinal 1 ====
Rank	Rowers	Nation	Time	Notes
1	Jeffrey McLaughlin; Doug Burden; Thomas Bohrer; Patrick Manning	United States	5:58.87	QA
2	Milan Janša; Sadik Mujkič; Sašo Mirjanič; Janez Klemenčič	Slovenia	5:59.52	QA
3	Bart Peters; Niels van der Zwan; Jaap Krijtenburg; Sven Schwarz	Netherlands	6:00.55	QA
4	Fernando Climent; José María de Marco; Juan Aguirre; Fernando Molina	Spain	6:04.59	QB
5	Viktor Pitirimov; Roman Monchenko; Vladimir Sokolov; Vadim Yunash	Unified Team	6:05.29	QB
6	Don Telfer; Brian Saunderson; Cedric Burgers; Greg Stevenson	Canada	6:09.20	QB

==== Semifinal 2 ====
Rank	Rowers	Nation	Time	Notes
1	Andrew Cooper; Nick Green; Mike McKay; James Tomkins	Australia	5:58.26	QA
2	Armin Weyrauch; Matthias Ungemach; Dirk Balster; Markus Vogt	Germany	5:59.38	QA
3	Scott Brownlee; Chris White; Pat Peoples; Campbell Clayton-Greene	New Zealand	6:01.19	QA
4	Salih Hassan; John Garrett; Gavin Stewart; Richard Stanhope	Great Britain	6:02.87	QB
5	Luca Sartori; Rocco Pecoraro; Roby La Mura; Riccardo Dei Rossi	Italy	6:09.72	QB
6	Jean-Pierre Le Lain; Patrick Vibert-Vichet; Bruno Dumay; Dominique Lecointe	France	6:12.57	QB

=== Finals ===
==== Final C ====
Rank	Rowers	Nation	Time
13	Vasile Hanuseac; Nicolae Spîrcu; Florin Ene; Ioan Snep	Romania	6:34.85
14	Vjatšeslav Divonin; Toomas Vilpart; Tarmo Virkus; Marek Avamere	Estonia	6:38.76

==== Final B ====
Rank	Rowers	Nation	Time
7	Salih Hassan; John Garrett; Gavin Stewart; Richard Stanhope	Great Britain	6:05.00
8	Luca Sartori; Rocco Pecoraro; Roby La Mura; Riccardo Dei Rossi	Italy	6:06.21
9	Fernando Climent; José María de Marco; Juan Aguirre; Fernando Molina	Spain	6:06.66
10	Viktor Pitirimov; Roman Monchenko; Vladimir Sokolov; Vadim Yunash	Unified Team	6:10.62
11	Don Telfer; Brian Saunderson; Cedric Burgers; Greg Stevenson	Canada	6:13.01
12	Jean-Pierre Le Lain; Patrick Vibert-Vichet; Bruno Dumay; Dominique Lecointe	France	6:17.69

==== Final A ====
Rank	Rowers	Nation	Time
1st place, gold medalist(s)	Andrew Cooper; Nick Green; Mike McKay; James Tomkins	Australia	5:55.04
2nd place, silver medalist(s)	Jeffrey McLaughlin; Doug Burden; Thomas Bohrer; Patrick Manning	United States	5:56.68
3rd place, bronze medalist(s)	Milan Janša; Sadik Mujkič; Sašo Mirjanič; Janez Klemenčič	Slovenia	5:58.24
4	Armin Weyrauch; Matthias Ungemach; Dirk Balster; Markus Vogt	Germany	5:58.39
5	Bart Peters; Niels van der Zwan; Jaap Krijtenburg; Sven Schwarz	Netherlands	5:59.14
6	Scott Brownlee; Chris White; Pat Peoples; Campbell Clayton-Greene	New Zealand	6:02.13

== Final classification ==
The following rowers took part:

Rank	Rowers	Country
1st place, gold medalist(s)	Andrew Cooper; Nick Green; Mike McKay; James Tomkins	Australia
2nd place, silver medalist(s)	Jeffrey McLaughlin; William Burden; Thomas Bohrer; Patrick Manning	United States
3rd place, bronze medalist(s)	Milan Janša; Sadik Mujkič; Sašo Mirjanič; Janez Klemenčič	Slovenia
	Armin Weyrauch; Matthias Ungemach; Dirk Balster; Markus Vogt	Germany
	Bart Peters; Niels van der Zwan; Jaap Krijtenburg; Sven Schwarz	Netherlands
	Scott Brownlee; Chris White; Pat Peoples; Campbell Clayton-Greene	New Zealand
	Salih Hassan; John Garrett; Gavin Stewart; Richard Stanhope	Great Britain
	Luca Sartori; Rocco Pecoraro; Roby La Mura; Riccardo Dei Rossi	Italy
	Fernando Climent; José María de Marco; Juan Aguirre; Fernando Molina	Spain
	Viktor Pitirimov; Roman Monchenko; Vladimir Sokolov; Vadim Yunash	Unified Team
	Don Telfer; Brian Saunderson; Cedric Burgers; Greg Stevenson	Canada
	Jean-Pierre Le Lain; Patrick Vibert-Vichet; Bruno Dumay; Dominique Lecointe	France
	Vasile Hanuseac; Nicolae Spîrcu; Florin Ene; Ioan Snep	Romania
	Vjatšeslav Divonin; Toomas Vilpart; Tarmo Virkus; Marek Avamere	Estonia
