= Slovenia at the 1992 Summer Olympics =

- IOC code: SLO
- NOC: Olympic Committee of Slovenia

in Barcelona
- Competitors: 35 (29 men and 6 women) in 12 sports
- Flag bearer: Rajmond Debevec
- Medals Ranked 52nd: Gold 0 Silver 0 Bronze 2 Total 2

Summer Olympics appearances (overview)
- 1992; 1996; 2000; 2004; 2008; 2012; 2016; 2020; 2024; 2028

Other related appearances
- Austria (1912); Yugoslavia (1920–1988)

Slovenia competed in the Summer Olympic Games for the first time at the 1992 Summer Olympics in Barcelona, Spain. It was the first Olympiad after Slovenia seceded from Yugoslavia. 35 competitors, 29 men and 6 women, took part in 34 events in 12 sports.

== Medalists ==
Medal	Name	Sport	Event	Date
Bronze	Iztok Čop; Denis Žvegelj	Rowing	Men's coxless pair	1 August
Bronze	Milan Janša; Janez Klemenčič; Sašo Mirjanič; Sadik Mujkič	Rowing	Men's coxless four	2 August

== Competitors ==
The following is the list of number of competitors in the Games.

Sport	Men	Women	Total
Archery	1	0	1
Athletics	2	2	4
Canoeing	6	0	6
Cycling	1	0	1
Gymnastics	1	0	1
Judo	2	0	2
Rowing	6	0	6
Sailing	3	0	3
Shooting	1	0	1
Swimming	4	1	5
Table tennis	0	1	1
Tennis	2	2	4
Total	29	6	35

== Archery ==
In Slovenia's first archery competition, the nation entered one archer. He narrowly missed qualifying for the elimination rounds.

Men

Athlete	Event	Ranking round		Round of 32	Round of 16	Quarterfinals	Semifinals	Final	
Athlete	Event	Score	Seed	Score	Score	Score	Score	Score	Rank
Samo Medved	Individual	1266	33	did not advance					

== Athletics ==
Men
Track & road events

Athlete	Event	Heat		Quarterfinal		Semifinal		Final	
Athlete	Event	Result	Rank	Result	Rank	Result	Rank	Result	Rank
Mirko Vindiš	Marathon	—N/a						2:21.03	40

Field events

Athlete	Event	Qualification		Final	
Athlete	Event	Distance	Position	Distance	Position
Borut Bilač	Long jump	8.00	10 Q	7.76	9

Women
Track & road events

Athlete	Event	Heat		Quarterfinal		Semifinal		Final	
Athlete	Event	Result	Rank	Result	Rank	Result	Rank	Result	Rank
Brigita Bukovec	100 m hurdles	13.45	4 Q	13.28	5 Q	13.68	9	did not advance	

Field events

Athlete	Event	Qualification		Final	
Athlete	Event	Distance	Position	Distance	Position
Britta Bilač	High jump	1.92	14 q	1.83	15

== Canoeing ==
=== Slalom ===
Athlete	Event	Preliminary				Final	
Athlete	Event	Run 1	Rank	Run 2	Rank	Best	Rank
Borut Javornik	Men's C-1	134.78	18	123.94	13	123.94	16
Jože Vidmar	Men's C-1	122.26	7	124.57	14	122.26	14
Boštjan Žitnik	Men's C-1	137.72	20	121.09	8	121.09	10
Albin Čižman	Men's K-1	112.12	8	110.73	5	110.73	9
Janez Skok	Men's K-1	112.00	7	111.52	6	111.52	10
Marjan Štrukelj	Men's K-1	110.11	3	131.75	31	110.11	6

== Cycling ==
One male cyclist represented Slovenia in 1992.

=== Road ===
Athlete	Event	Time	Rank
Valter Bonča	Men's road race	4:35:56	63

== Gymnastics ==
=== Artistic ===
Men

Athlete	Event	Qualification								Final							
Athlete	Event	Apparatus						Total	Rank	Apparatus						Total	Rank
Athlete	Event	F	PH	R	V	PB	HB	Total	Rank	F	PH	R	V	PB	HB	Total	Rank
Jože Kolman	Individual all-around	18.275	18.575	18.400	18.700	18.650	18.275	110.875	80	did not advance							

== Judo ==
Men

Athlete	Event	Preliminary	Round of 32	Round of 16	Quarterfinals	Semifinals	Repechage 1	Repechage 2	Repechage 3	Repechage Final	Final / BM	
Athlete	Event	Opposition Result	Opposition Result	Opposition Result	Opposition Result	Opposition Result	Opposition Result	Opposition Result	Opposition Result	Opposition Result	Opposition Result	Rank
Štefan Cuk	−65 kg	BYE	Ciarán Ward (IRL); W 1000-0000	Israel Hernandez Planas (CUB); L 0000-1000	Did not advance		BYE	Dănun Pop (ROU); L 0000–0100	Did not advance			
Filip Leščak	−86 kg	BYE	Bernhard Spijkers (NED); L 0000-1000	Did not advance								

== Rowing ==
Men

Athlete	Event	Heats		Repechage		Semifinals C-D		Semifinals		Final	
Athlete	Event	Time	Rank	Time	Rank	Time	Rank	Time	Rank	Time	Rank
Iztok Čop; Denis Žvegelj	Coxless pair	6:37.11	2 R	6:46.71	1 Q	—N/a		6:34.48	3 Q	6:33.43	Bronze medal
Milan Janša; Sadik Mujkič; Sašo Mirjanič; Janez Klemenčič	Coxless four	6:04.91	3 Q	BYE		—N/a		5:59.52	2 Q	5:58.24	Bronze medal

== Sailing ==
Men

Athlete	Event	Race										Net points	Final rank
Athlete	Event	1	2	3	4	5	6	7	8	9	10	Net points	Final rank
Stojan Vidakovič	Lechner A-390	9	7	17	9	~~28~~	18	14	5	8	11	151.0	9

Open

Athlete	Event	Race										Net points	Final rank
Athlete	Event	1	2	3	4	5	6	7	8	9	10	Net points	Final rank
Mitja Kosmina; Goran Šošić	Flying Dutchman	14	~~20~~	21	17	3	20	1	—N/a			100.7	12

== Shooting ==
Men

Athlete	Event	Qualification		Final	
Athlete	Event	Score	Rank	Score	Rank
Rajmond Debevec	Men's 50 metre rifle three positions	1167	6 Q	1262.6	6
Rajmond Debevec	Men's 50 metre rifle prone	594	18	did not advance	
Rajmond Debevec	10 m air rifle	589	9	did not advance	

== Swimming ==
Men

Athlete	Event	Heat		Final B		Final	
Athlete	Event	Time	Rank	Time	Rank	Time	Rank
Jure Bučar	200 m freestyle	1:53.19	29	did not advance			
Jure Bučar	400 m freestyle	3:55.28	16 q	3:56.93	16	did not advance	
Igor Majcen	1500 m freestyle	15:16.85	6 Q	—N/a		15:19.12	6
Nace Majcen	200 m freestyle	1:54.57	35	did not advance			
Nace Majcen	400 m freestyle	4:00.42	31	did not advance			
Matjaž Kozelj	100 m butterfly	56.65	42	did not advance			
Matjaž Kozelj	200 m butterfly	2:01.39	19	did not advance			

Women

Athlete	Event	Heat		Final B		Final	
Athlete	Event	Time	Rank	Time	Rank	Time	Rank
Tanja Godina	100 m backstroke	1:06.97	41	did not advance			
Tanja Godina	200 m backstroke	2:25.31	41	did not advance			

== Table tennis ==
Women

Athlete	Event	Group Stage				Round of 16	Quarterfinals	Semifinals	Final	
Athlete	Event	Opposition Result	Opposition Result	Opposition Result	Rank	Opposition Result	Opposition Result	Opposition Result	Opposition Result	Rank
Polona Frelih	Women's singles	Hyun Jung-Hwa (KOR); L 0–2	Lotta Erlman (SWE); L 0–2	Feiza Ben Aïssa (TUN); W 2–0	3	Did not advance				

== Tennis ==
Men

Athlete	Event	Round of 32	Round of 16	Quarterfinals	Semifinals	Final / BM	
Athlete	Event	Opposition Score	Opposition Score	Opposition Score	Opposition Score	Opposition Score	Rank
Iztok Božič; Blaž Trupej	Doubles	Leander Paes; Ramesh Krishnan (IND); L 3–6, 2–6, 2–6	did not advance				

Women

Athlete	Event	Round of 32	Round of 16	Quarterfinals	Semifinals	Final / BM	
Athlete	Event	Opposition Score	Opposition Score	Opposition Score	Opposition Score	Opposition Score	Rank
Tina Križan; Karin Lušnic	Doubles	Manuela Maleeva-Fragnière; Emanuela Zardo (SUI); L 2–6, 2–6	did not advance				
