= Estonia at the 1992 Summer Olympics =

- IOC code: EST
- NOC: Estonian Olympic Committee

in Barcelona
- Competitors: 37 (33 men and 4 women) in 13 sports
- Flag bearer: Heino Lipp
- Medals Ranked 34th: Gold 1 Silver 0 Bronze 1 Total 2

Summer Olympics appearances (overview)
- 1920; 1924; 1928; 1932; 1936; 1948–1988; 1992; 1996; 2000; 2004; 2008; 2012; 2016; 2020; 2024

Other related appearances
- Russian Empire (1908–1912); Soviet Union (1952–1988)

Estonia competed at the 1992 Summer Olympics in Barcelona, Spain. It was the first Olympiad after the breakup of the Soviet Union. Estonia was one of three ex-Soviet republics to compete individually, with Latvia and Lithuania being the other two, instead of competing on the Unified Team. 37 competitors, 33 men and 4 women, took part in 35 events in 13 sports.

== Medalists ==
| Medal | Name | Sport | Event | Date |
|---|---|---|---|---|
| Gold | Erika Salumäe | Cycling | Women's sprint | 31 July |
| Bronze | Tõnu Tõniste; Toomas Tõniste | Sailing | Men's 470 | 3 August |

== Competitors ==
The following is the list of number of competitors in the Games.

| Sport | Men | Women | Total |
|---|---|---|---|
| Archery | 1 | 0 | 1 |
| Athletics | 4 | 1 | 5 |
| Canoeing | 1 | 0 | 1 |
| Cycling | 2 | 1 | 3 |
| Fencing | 2 | 0 | 2 |
| Judo | 1 | 0 | 1 |
| Modern pentathlon | 1 | – | 1 |
| Rowing | 7 | 0 | 7 |
| Sailing | 3 | 1 | 4 |
| Shooting | 2 | 1 | 3 |
| Swimming | 4 | 0 | 4 |
| Table tennis | 1 | 0 | 1 |
| Wrestling | 4 | – | 4 |
| Total | 33 | 4 | 37 |

== Archery ==
Estonia sent one man to its first independent Olympic archery competition. He did not qualify for the elimination rounds.

Men

| Athlete | Event | Ranking round | | Round of 32 | Round of 16 | Quarterfinals | Semifinals | Final | |
| Athlete | Event | Score | Seed | Score | Score | Score | Score | Score | Rank |
|---|---|---|---|---|---|---|---|---|---|
| Raul Kivilo | Individual | 1245 | 52 | Did not advance | | | | | |

== Athletics ==
Men
Field events

| Athlete | Event | Qualification | | Final | |
| Athlete | Event | Distance | Position | Distance | Position |
|---|---|---|---|---|---|
| Valeri Bukrejev | Men's pole vault | 5.50 | 18 | Did not advance | |
| Jüri Tamm | Men's hammer throw | 78.16 | 4 Q | 77.52 | 5 |

Combined events – Men's decathlon

| Athlete | Event | 100 m | LJ | SP | HJ | 400 m | 100H | DT | PV | JT | 1500 m | Final | Rank |
|---|---|---|---|---|---|---|---|---|---|---|---|---|---|
| Andrei Nazarov | Result | 11.03 | 7.13 | 13.11 | 2.09 | 49.03 | 14.60 | 44.58 | 4.80 | 54.56 | 4:26.19 | 8052 | 14 |
| Andrei Nazarov | Points | 854 | 845 | 674 | 887 | 860 | 899 | 758 | 849 | 656 | 770 | 8052 | 14 |
| Erki Nool | Result | 11.08 | 7.79 | 12.14 | 1.97 | 49.76 | 15,95 | 35.42 | 5.00 | NM | DNS | DNF | |
| Erki Nool | Points | 843 | 1007 | 615 | 776 | 826 | 738 | 572 | 910 | 0 | 0 | DNF | |

Women
Track & road events

| Athlete | Event | Heat | | Quarterfinal | | Semifinal | | Final | |
| Athlete | Event | Result | Rank | Result | Rank | Result | Rank | Result | Rank |
|---|---|---|---|---|---|---|---|---|---|
| Anu Kaljurand | Women's 100 m hurdles | 13.81 | 6 | Did not advance | | | | | |

Combined events – Heptathlon

| Athlete | Event | 100H | HJ | SP | 200 m | LJ | JT | 800 m | Final | Rank |
|---|---|---|---|---|---|---|---|---|---|---|
| Anu Kaljurand | Result | 13.64 | 1.73 | 12.83 | 25.29 | 6.35 | 47.42 | 2:19.61 | 6095 | 17 |
| Anu Kaljurand | Points | 1030 | 891 | 716 | 860 | 959 | 810 | 829 | 6095 | 17 |

== Canoeing ==
=== Sprint ===
Men

| Athlete | Event | Heats | | Repechages | | Semifinals | | Final | |
| Athlete | Event | Time | Rank | Time | Rank | Time | Rank | Time | Rank |
|---|---|---|---|---|---|---|---|---|---|
| Tiit Tikerpe | C-1 500 m | 1.57,95 | 4 Q | 1.56,24 | 2 Q | 2.06,24 | 9 | Did not advance | |
| Tiit Tikerpe | C-1 1000 m | 4.14,73 | 5 Q | 4.05,05 | 3 Q | DQ | | Did not advance | |

== Cycling ==
Three cyclists, two men and one woman, represented Estonia in 1992. Erika Salumäe won gold in the women's sprint.

=== Road ===
| Athlete | Event | Time | Rank |
|---|---|---|---|
| Lauri Aus | Men's road race | 4:35.56 | 5 |
| Raido Kodanipork | Men's road race | 4:35.56 | 9 |

=== Track ===
Sprint

| Athlete | Event | Qualification | | 1st round | Repechage | Quarter-finals | Classification 5–8 | Semifinals | Final | |
| Athlete | Event | Time | Rank | Opposition Time | Opposition Time | Opposition Time | Opposition Time | Opposition Time | Opposition Time | Rank |
|---|---|---|---|---|---|---|---|---|---|---|
| Erika Salumäe | Women's individual sprint | 11.857 | 6 Q | Neumann (GER); Larreal (VEN); W 12.377 | —N/a | Yenyukhina (EUN); W 12.192; 12.090 | —N/a | Ballanger (FRA); W 11.937; 12.423 | Neumann (GER); W 12.667; 12.24 | |

== Fencing ==
Two male fencers represented Estonia in 1992.

Men

=== Individual ===
| Athlete | Event | Elimination Round | Round I | Repechage Round I | Round II | Repechage Round II | Round III | Repechage Round III | Round IV | Quarterfinal | Semifinal | Final / BM | |
| Athlete | Event | Opposition Score | Opposition Score | Opposition Score | Opposition Score | Opposition Score | Opposition Score | Opposition Score | Opposition Score | Opposition Score | Opposition Score | Opposition Score | Rank |
|---|---|---|---|---|---|---|---|---|---|---|---|---|---|
| Kaido Kaaberma | Individual épée | 13 Q | Handry Lenzun (INA); W 5:1;1:5;5:3 | BYE | Lee Sang-ki (KOR); W 5:2;5:3 | BYE | Fernando de la Peña (ESP); W 6:4;6:5 | BYE | Éric Srecki (FRA); W 5:3;3:5;6:5 | Mauricio Rivas (COL); W 5:3;5:3 | Éric Srecki (FRA); L 2:5;3:5 | Jean-Michel Henry (FRA); L 5:2;2:5;3:5 | 4 |
| Viktor Zuikov | Individual épée | 38 Q | Szerhij Kravcsuk (EUN); L 5:6;4:6 | Did not advance | | | | | | | | | 39 |

== Judo ==
Men

| Athlete | Event | Preliminary | Round of 32 | Round of 16 | Quarterfinals | Semifinals | Repechage 1 | Repechage 2 | Repechage 3 | Repechage Final | Final / BM | |
| Athlete | Event | Opposition Result | Opposition Result | Opposition Result | Opposition Result | Opposition Result | Opposition Result | Opposition Result | Opposition Result | Opposition Result | Opposition Result | Rank |
|---|---|---|---|---|---|---|---|---|---|---|---|---|
| Indrek Pertelson | −95 kg | BYE | Raymond Stevens (GBR); L 0001–0000 | —N/a | | | BYE | Radu Ivan (ROU); W 1000–0000 | Belarmino Salgado Martinez (CUB); W 1000–0000 | Robert Van De Walle (BEL); W 1000–0000 | Theo Meijer (NED); L 0000–0100 | 5 |

== Modern pentathlon ==
One male pentathlete represented Estonia in 1992.

| Athlete | Event | Shooting (10 m air pistol) | Fencing (épée one touch) | Swimming (200 m freestyle) | Riding (show jumping) | Running (3000 m) | Total points | Final rank |
| Athlete | Event | Points | Points | Points | Points | Points | Total points | Final rank |
|---|---|---|---|---|---|---|---|---|
| Imre Tiidemann | Men's | 1030 | 796 | 1208 | 1276 | 670 | 4980 | 39 |

== Rowing ==
Men

| Athlete | Event | Heats | | Repechage | | Semifinals C-D | | Semifinals | | Final | |
| Athlete | Event | Time | Rank | Time | Rank | Time | Rank | Time | Rank | Time | Rank |
|---|---|---|---|---|---|---|---|---|---|---|---|
| Jüri Jaanson | Single sculls | 6.59,14 | 2 R | 7.05,52 | 1 Q | —N/a | | 6.53,40 | 2 Q | 7.12,92 | 5 |
| Roman Lutoškin; Priit Tasane | Men's double sculls | 6.44,79 | 4 R | 6.38,58 | 2 Q | —N/a | | 6.21,43 | 2 Q | 6.21,43 | 4 |
| Marek Avamere; Vjatšeslav Divonin; Toomas Vilpart; Tarmo Virkus | Men's coxless four | 6.27,97 | 5 R | 6.30,63 | 5 Q | —N/a | | | | 6.38,76 | 14 |

== Sailing ==
Men

| Athlete | Event | Race | | | | | | | | | | Net points | Final rank |
| Athlete | Event | 1 | 2 | 3 | 4 | 5 | 6 | 7 | 8 | 9 | 10 | Net points | Final rank |
|---|---|---|---|---|---|---|---|---|---|---|---|---|---|
| Kaijo Kuusing | Lechner A-390 | ~~PMS~~ | 17 | 8 | 22 | 24 | 22 | 21 | 20 | 16 | 29 | 233 | 21 |
| Tõnu Tõniste; Toomas Tõniste | 470 | 10 | 11 | 7 | 4 | 6 | ~~28~~ | 2 | —N/a | | | 68,70 | |

Women

| Athlete | Event | Race | | | | | | | | | | Net points | Final rank |
| Athlete | Event | 1 | 2 | 3 | 4 | 5 | 6 | 7 | 8 | 9 | 10 | Net points | Final rank |
|---|---|---|---|---|---|---|---|---|---|---|---|---|---|
| Krista Kruuv | Europe | 3 | 8 | 3 | 9 | 9 | 6 | ~~16~~ | —N/a | | | 67,10 | 6 |

== Shooting ==
Women

| Athlete | Event | Qualification | | Final | |
| Athlete | Event | Score | Rank | Score | Rank |
|---|---|---|---|---|---|
| Inna Rose | 25 m pistol | 567 | 35 | Did not advance | |
| Inna Rose | 10 m air pistol | 376 | 21 | Did not advance | |

Open

| Athlete | Event | Qualification | | Semifinal | | Final | |
| Athlete | Event | Score | Rank | Score | Rank | Score | Rank |
|---|---|---|---|---|---|---|---|
| Andrei Inešin | Skeet | 145 | 25 | Did not advance | | | |
| Peeter Päkk | Skeet | 144 | 33 | Did not advance | | | |
| Urmas Saaliste | Trap | 137 | 39 | Did not advance | | | |

== Swimming ==
Men

| Athlete | Event | Heat | | Final B | | Final | |
| Athlete | Event | Time | Rank | Time | Rank | Time | Rank |
|---|---|---|---|---|---|---|---|
| Ilmar Ojase | 100 m backstroke | 57.08 | 20 | Did not advance | | | |
| Ilmar Ojase | 200 m backstroke | 2:05.76 | 30 | Did not advance | | | |
| Marco Pachel | 100 m breaststroke | 1:03.40 | 19 | Did not advance | | | |
| Indrek Sei | 50 m freestyle | 23.68 | 31 | Did not advance | | | |
| Indrek Sei | 100 m freestyle | 51.47 | 32 | Did not advance | | | |
| Aldo Suurväli | 100 m butterfly | 55.78 | 30 | Did not advance | | | |
| Ilmar Ojase; Marco Pachel; Aldo Suurväli; Indrek Sei | 4 × 100 m Medley Relay | 3:46.87 | 15 | —N/a | | Did not advance | |

== Table tennis ==
| Athlete | Event | Group Stage | | | | Round of 16 | Quarterfinals | Semifinals | Final | |
| Athlete | Event | Opposition Result | Opposition Result | Opposition Result | Rank | Opposition Result | Opposition Result | Opposition Result | Opposition Result | Rank |
|---|---|---|---|---|---|---|---|---|---|---|
| Igor Solopov | Men's singles | Kang Hee-Chan (KOR); L 0–2 | Mourad Sta (TUN); W 2–0 | Jan-Ove Waldner (SWE); L 0–2 | 3 | Did not advance | | | | |

== Wrestling ==
Men's freestyle

| Athlete | Event | Elimination Pool | | | | | | | Final round | |
| Athlete | Event | Round 1 Result | Round 2 Result | Round 3 Result | Round 4 Result | Round 5 Result | Round 6 Result | Rank | Final round Result | Rank |
|---|---|---|---|---|---|---|---|---|---|---|
| Küllo Kõiv | −68 kg | Georg Schwabenland (GER); L 2–4 | Ko Young-ho (KOR); L 1–3 | —N/a | | | | 8 | Did not advance | |
| Arvi Aavik | −100 kg | Manabu Nakanishi (JPN); W 4–0 | Subhash Verma (IND); L 0–3 | Heiko Balz (GER); L 0–3 | Kazem Gholami (IRI); L 4–8 | —N/a | | 6 | Did not advance | |

Men's Greco-Roman

| Athlete | Event | Elimination Pool | | | | | | | Final round | |
| Athlete | Event | Round 1 Result | Round 2 Result | Round 3 Result | Round 4 Result | Round 5 Result | Round 6 Result | Rank | Final round Result | Rank |
|---|---|---|---|---|---|---|---|---|---|---|
| Valeri Nikitin | −68 kg | Kim Sung-Moon (KOR); W 9–6 | Abdollah Chamangoli (IRN); L 5–7 | Islam Dugushiev (EUN); L 0–4 | —N/a | | | 7 | Did not advance | |
| Helger Hallik | −100 kg | Jörgen Olsson (SWE); W 1–0 | BYE | Andrzej Wroński (POL); L 0–2 | Dennis Koslowski (USA); L 0–2 | —N/a | | 5 | Miloš Govedarica (IOP); L 0–2 | 10 |

Remarks

- Wrestler Andreas Steinbach, born in Tartu, Estonia, competed for Germany (→ 5th place )
