= Slovenian Rowing Federation =

- Sport: Rowing
- Founded: 1952
- Affiliation: FISA
- Headquarters: Zupanciceva 9, 4260 Bled, SI
- President: Jošt Dolničar
- Board members: Darko Golob vp, Jošt Dolničar, dr. Peter Fajfar, Miloš Janša, Dušan Jurše, dr. Vladimir Meglič, Jože Osterman, Branko Pišlar, Slobodan Radujko,
- Secretary: Jernej Slivnik
- Coach: Miloš Janša

Official website
- www.veslaska-zveza.si
- (Slovenia)

The Slovenian Rowing Federation (Slovene: Veslaška zveza Slovenije) is the governing body of rowing in Slovenia. It is responsible for Slovenian national Rowing team, and organization of the international regattas, World Cup in Rowing, Bled 2010 and World Rowing Championships in Bled 2011.

The federation was formed in 1952. It is a member of the Slovenian Olympic Committee and the International Federation of Rowing Associations

It organized the World Rowing Championships on Bled in 1966, 1979, 1989, and will host it again in 2011

== Presidents ==
- Slobodan Radujko 1994–2004
- Tomo Levovnik 2004–2009
- Denis Žvegelj 2009–2013
- Jošt Dolničar 2013-

== Major achievements ==
Slovenian rowers have many international successes in World Rowing Championships, European Rowing Championships, Junior World Rowing Championships, U23 World Rowing Championships and Olympic Games

- Seoul 1988 Olympic Games bronze medal 2- (Coxless pair) Sadik Mujkič, Bojan Prešern (racing as Yugoslavia)
- Barcelona 1992 Olympic Games bronze medal 2- (Coxless pair) Denis Žvegelj, Iztok Čop
- Barcelona 1992 Olympic Games bronze medal 4- (Coxless four) Sadik Mujkič, Milan Janša, Sašo Mirjanič, Jani Klemenčič
- Sydney 2000 Olympic Games gold medal 2x (Double scull) Iztok Čop, Luka Špik
- Athens 2004 Olympic Games silver medal 2x (Double scull) Iztok Čop, Luka Špik
- London 2012 Olympic Games bronze medal 2x (Double scull) Iztok Čop, Luka Špik
- National coach for all winning medals was Miloš Janša
