= Sailing at the 1988 Summer Olympics – Men's Division II =

Sailing at the Olympics

Division II class at the Games of the XXIV Olympiad
- Lechner Division II
- Venue: Busan 부산 釜山
- Dates: 20–27 September
- Competitors: 45 from 45 nations
- Teams: 45

Medalists
1st place, gold medalist(s)		Bruce Kendall	New Zealand
2nd place, silver medalist(s)		Jan Boersma	Netherlands Antilles
3rd place, bronze medalist(s)		Mike Gebhardt	United States

The Division II was a sailing event on the Sailing at the 1988 Summer Olympics program in Pusan, South Korea. Seven races were scheduled. 45 sailors, on 45 boats, from 45 nations competed.

== Results ==
Rank	Helmsman (Country)	Race I		Race II		Race III		Race IV		Race V		Race VI		Race VII		Total Points	Total -1
Rank	Helmsman (Country)	Rank	Points	Rank	Points	Rank	Points	Rank	Points	Rank	Points	Rank	Points	Rank	Points	Total Points	Total -1
1st place, gold medalist(s)	Bruce Kendall (NZL)	3	5.7	3	5.7	1	0.0	5	10.0	8	14.0	1	0.0	~~9~~	~~15.0~~	50.4	35.4
2nd place, silver medalist(s)	Jan Boersma (AHO)	1	0.0	8	14.0	8	14.0	6	11.7	1	0.0	~~10~~	~~16.0~~	2	3.0	58.7	42.7
3rd place, bronze medalist(s)	Mike Gebhardt (USA)	4	8.0	1	0.0	YMP	8.0	~~11~~	~~17.0~~	5	10.0	8	14.0	4	8.0	65.0	48.0
4	Bart Verschoor (NED)	~~12~~	~~18.0~~	5	10.0	4	8.0	4	8.0	3	5.7	6	11.7	5	10.0	71.4	53.4
5	Robert Nagy (FRA)	~~15~~	~~21.0~~	14	20.0	2	3.0	3	5.7	YMP	10.3	3	5.7	11	17.0	82.7	61.7
6	Francesco Wirz (ITA)	7	13.0	2	3.0	10	16.0	2	3.0	~~RET~~	~~52.0~~	2	3.0	19	25.0	115.0	63.0
7	Jorge Ruben Garcia Velazco (ARG)	6	11.7	11	17.0	3	5.7	~~12~~	~~18.0~~	6	11.7	4	8.0	10	16.0	88.1	70.1
8	Carlos Iniesta (ESP)	5	10.0	21	27.0	27	33.0	1	0.0	2	3.0	~~24~~	~~30.0~~	6	11.7	114.7	81.7
9	Jan Bonga (SUI)	2	3.0	~~19~~	~~25.0~~	16	22.0	24	30.0	4	8.0	12	18.0	3	5.7	111.7	81.7
10	Christopher Lawrence (AUS)	14	20.0	4	8.0	9	15.0	~~17~~	~~23.0~~	YMP	14.4	5	10.0	13	19.0	109.4	86.4
11	Thomas Wallner (AUT)	17	23.0	16	22.0	~~RET~~	~~52.0~~	10	16.0	7	13.0	11	17.0	1	0.0	143.0	91.0
12	Richard Myerscough (CAN)	8	14.0	7	13.0	22	28.0	~~DSQ~~	~~52.0~~	YMP	16.2	7	13.0	7	13.0	149.2	97.2
13	Dirk Meyer (FRG)	10	16.0	9	15.0	12	18.0	7	13.0	11	17.0	~~26~~	~~32.0~~	14	20.0	131.0	99.0
14	Simon Goody (GBR)	11	17.0	15	21.0	7	13.0	~~21~~	~~27.0~~	15	21.0	14	20.0	8	14.0	133.0	106.0
15	Roland Milošević (YUG)	24	30.0	12	18.0	6	11.7	8	14.0	~~RET~~	~~52.0~~	9	15.0	18	24.0	164.7	112.7
16	George Rebello (BRA)	13	19.0	~~23~~	~~29.0~~	23	29.0	9	15.0	13	19.0	13	19.0	17	23.0	153.0	124.0
17	Grzegorz Myszkowski (POL)	16	22.0	6	11.7	~~24~~	~~30.0~~	14	20.0	16	22.0	19	25.0	22	28.0	158.7	128.7
18	Ryo Asano (JPN)	20	26.0	18	24.0	15	21.0	~~19~~	~~25.0~~	10	16.0	16	22.0	16	22.0	156.0	130.0
19	Luís Caliço (POR)	~~23~~	29.0	26	32.0	14	20.0	15	21.0	9	15.0	23	29.0	12	18.0	164.0	132.0
20	Magnus Torell (SWE)	18	24.0	10	16.0	17	23.0	~~20~~	~~26.0~~	14	20.0	17	23.0	20	26.0	158.0	132.0
21	Håkon Nissen-Lie (NOR)	9	15.0	~~DSQ~~	~~52.0~~	4	8.0	16	22.0	12	18.0	18	24.0	DSQ	52.0	191.0	139.0
22	Jiang Chen (CHN)	21	27.0	13	19.0	13	19.0	YMP	23.6	~~RET~~	~~52.0~~	15	21.0	26	32.0	193.6	141.6
23	Osvaldo Alcaide (PUR)	22	28.0	20	26.0	21	27.0	13	19.0	~~RET~~	~~52.0~~	25	31.0	25	31.0	214.0	162.0
24	Luke Baldauf (ISV)	25	31.0	25	31.0	30	36.0	22	28.0	~~RET~~	~~52.0~~	21	27.0	15	21.0	226.0	174.0
25	Anan Hohsuwan (THA)	29	35.0	17	23.0	25	31.0	18	24.0	~~RET~~	~~52.0~~	20	26.0	33	39.0	230.0	178.0
26	Richard Paz (PHI)	~~36~~	~~42.0~~	35	41.0	33	39.0	26	32.0	17	23.0	22	28.0	23	29.0	234.0	192.0
27	Abdul Malik Faisal (INA)	31	37.0	24	30.0	20	26.0	32	38.0	~~RET~~	~~52.0~~	30	36.0	21	27.0	246.0	194.0
28	Anthony S. Philp (FIJ)	28	34.0	~~DSQ~~	~~52.0~~	18	24.0	23	29.0	18	24.0	27	33.0	RET	52.0	248.0	196.0
29	Matthew Arneborg (IVB)	27	33.0	22	28.0	28	34.0	25	31.0	~~RET~~	~~52.0~~	28	34.0	RET	52.0	264.0	212.0
30	Lee Han-im (KOR)	26	32.0	~~PMS~~	~~52.0~~	19	25.0	28	34.0	RET	52.0	32	38.0	30	36.0	269.0	217.0
31	Eli Fuller (ANT)	YMP	52.0	30	36.0	36	42.0	36	42.0	~~RET~~	~~38.0~~	34	40.0	24	30.0	280.0	228.0
32	Didier Gamerdinger (MON)	39	45.0	32	38.0	26	32.0	30	36.0	~~RET~~	~~52.0~~	33	39.0	32	38.0	280.0	228.0
33	Brian Talma (BAR)	~~DSQ~~	~~52.0~~	37	43.0	39	45.0	35	41.0	19	25.0	37	43.0	27	33.0	282.0	230.0
34	İbrahim Kakış (TUR)	35	41.0	28	34.0	40	46.0	33	39.0	~~RET~~	~~52.0~~	31	37.0	29	35.0	284.0	232.0
35	Jean-Paul Fieri Soler (MLT)	32	38.0	29	35.0	31	37.0	34	40.0	~~RET~~	~~52.0~~	38	44.0	RET	52.0	298.0	246.0
36	Stelios Georgosopulos (GRE)	19	25.0	27	33.0	~~RET~~	~~52.0~~	27	33.0	RET	52.0	RET	52.0	RET	52.0	299.0	247.0
37	Nikolay Kravchenko (URS)	30	36.0	34	40.0	29	35.0	29	35.0	~~DNC~~	~~52.0~~	DNC	52.0	DNC	52.0	302.0	250.0
38	Nilo Ozib (MEX)	40	46.0	38	44.0	35	41.0	~~PMS~~	~~52.0~~	RET	52.0	29	35.0	28	34.0	304.0	252.0
39	Sam Tak Sum Wong (HKG)	37	43.0	33	39.0	34	40.0	31	37.0	~~RET~~	~~52.0~~	36	42.0	RET	52.0	305.0	253.0
40	Robleh Ali Adou (DJI)	38	44.0	31	37.0	32	38.0	37	43.0	~~PMS~~	~~52.0~~	35	41.0	RET	52.0	307.0	255.0
41	Jan Iriarte (GUM)	34	40.0	~~DSQ~~	~~52.0~~	37	43.0	38	44.0	RET	52.0	40	46.0	31	37.0	314.0	262.0
42	Giovanni Conti (SMR)	33	39.0	36	42.0	41	47.0	39	45.0	~~RET~~	~~52.0~~	39	45.0	RET	52.0	322.0	270.0
43	Vernon Lapham (ZIM)	41	47.0	40	46.0	38	44.0	40	46.0	~~PMS~~	~~52.0~~	41	47.0	RET	52.0	334.0	282.0
44	Graham Numa (PNG)	~~RET~~	~~52.0~~	39	45.0	42	48.0	PMS	52.0	PMS	52.0	RET	52.0	DNC	52.0	353.0	301.0
45	Mohamed Al-Kaabi (QAT)	~~RET~~	~~52.0~~	DNC	52.0	DNC	52.0	DNC	52.0	DNC	52.0	DNC	52.0	DNC	52.0	364.0	312.0

DNF = Did not finish, DSQ = Disqualified, PMS = Premature start
Crossed out results did not count for the total result.
= Male, = Female

=== Daily standings ===
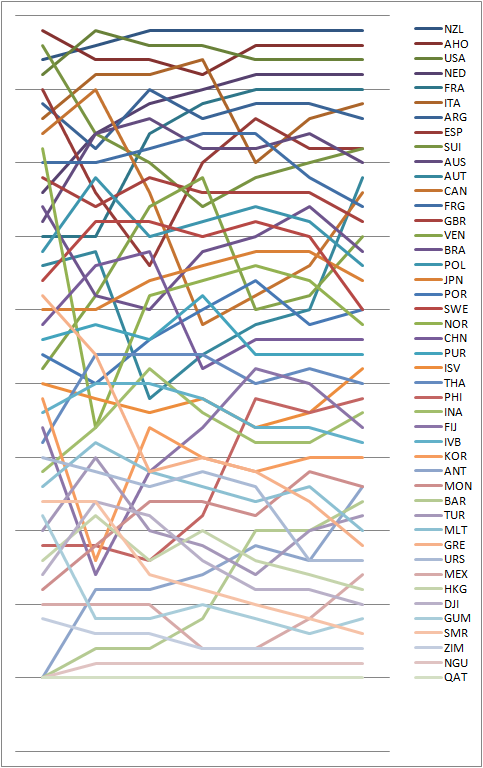
Graph showing the daily standings in the Division II during the 1988 Summer Olympics
