= Sailing at the 1992 Summer Olympics – Men's Lechner A-390 =

Sailing at the Olympics

Lechner A-390 Men's at the Games of the XXV Olympiad
- Lechner A-390
- Venue: Barcelona
- Dates: 27 July to 2 August
- Competitors: 45 from 45 nations
- Teams: 45

Medalists
1st place, gold medalist(s)		Franck David	France
2nd place, silver medalist(s)		Mike Gebhardt	United States
3rd place, bronze medalist(s)		Lars Kleppich	Australia

The Men's Sailboard (Lechner A-390) Competition at the 1992 Summer Olympics was held from 27 July to 4 August 1992, in Barcelona, Spain. Seven races were scheduled. 45 sailors, on 45 boats, from 45 nations competed.

== Results ==
Rank	Helmsman (Country)	Race I		Race II		Race III		Race IV		Race V		Race VI		Race VII		Race VIII		Race IX		Race X		Total Points	Total -1
Rank	Helmsman (Country)	Rank	Points	Rank	Points	Rank	Points	Rank	Points	Rank	Points	Rank	Points	Rank	Points	Rank	Points	Rank	Points	Rank	Points	Total Points	Total -1
1	Franck David (FRA)	8	14.0	3	5.7	12	18.0	1	0.0	4	8.0	4	8.0	2	3.0	8	14.0	~~17~~	~~23.0~~	1	0.0	93.7	70.7
2	Mike Gebhardt (USA)	3	5.7	4	8.0	5	10.0	2	3.0	~~11~~	~~17.0~~	7	13.0	11	17.0	3	5.7	2	3.0	3	5.7	88.1	71.1
3	Lars Kleppich (AUS)	6	11.7	5	10.0	7	13.0	4	8.0	7	13.0	~~9~~	~~15.0~~	8	14.0	2	3.0	7	13.0	7	13.0	113.7	98.7
4	Bruce Kendall (NZL)	12	18.0	18	24.0	~~DNF~~	~~51.0~~	3	5.7	10	16.0	1	0.0	1	0.0	13	19.0	14	20.0	2	3.0	156.7	105.7
5	Christoph Sieber (AUT)	18	24.0	8	14.0	2	3.0	6	11.7	2	3.0	12	18.0	6	11.7	~~27~~	~~33.0~~	3	5.7	13	19.0	143.1	110.1
6	Asier Fernández (ESP)	15	21.0	21	27.0	1	0.0	5	10.0	1	0.0	14	20.0	4	8.0	15	21.0	~~RET~~	~~51.0~~	5	10.0	168.0	117.0
7	Stephan van den Berg (NED)	7	13.0	14	20.0	13	19.0	~~PMS~~	~~51.0~~	12	18.0	11	17.0	3	5.7	1	0.0	1	0.0	19	25.0	168.7	117.7
8	Amit Inbar (ISR)	5	10.0	6	11.7	6	11.7	15	21.0	~~DNF~~	~~51.0~~	3	5.7	7	13.0	4	8.0	12	18.0	14	20.0	170.1	119.1
9	Nikolaos Kaklamanakis (GRE)	2	3.0	9	15.0	16	22.0	~~DSQ~~	~~51.0~~	6	11.7	8	14.0	5	10.0	14	20.0	10	16.0	6	11.7	174.4	123.4
10	Tony Philp (FIJ)	1	0.0	~~25~~	~~31.0~~	10	16.0	16	22.0	9	15.0	2	3.0	9	15.0	17	23.0	24	30.0	22	28.0	183.0	152.0
11	Stojan Vidakovič (SLO)	9	15.0	7	13.0	17	23.0	9	15.0	~~28~~	~~34.0~~	18	24.0	14	20.0	5	10.0	8	14.0	11	17.0	185.0	151.0
12	Barrie Edginton (GBR)	13	19.0	19	25.0	9	15.0	14	20.0	15	21.0	5	10.0	~~PMS~~	~~51.0~~	9	15.0	11	17.0	9	15.0	208.0	157.0
13	Magnus Torell (SWE)	4	8.0	13	19.0	19	25.0	10	16.0	5	10.0	15	21.0	17	23.0	10	16.0	13	19.0	~~21~~	~~27.0~~	184.0	157.0
14	Chen Jiang (CHN)	11	17.0	15	21.0	21	27.0	8	14.0	3	5.7	16	22.0	10	16.0	16	22.0	~~25~~	~~31.0~~	8	14.0	189.7	158.7
15	Paul Van Den Abeele (BEL)	19	25.0	2	3.0	14	20.0	7	13.0	~~20~~	~~26.0~~	20	26.0	12	18.0	11	17.0	19	25.0	17	23.0	196.0	170.0
16	Riccardo Giordano (ITA)	23	29.0	1	0.0	3	5.7	~~DSQ~~	~~51.0~~	27	33.0	6	11.7	27	33.0	22	28.0	6	11.7	24	30.0	233.1	182.1
17	Morten Egeblad Christoffersen (DEN)	16	22.0	12	18.0	11	17.0	17	23.0	21	27.0	17	23.0	~~PMS~~	~~51.0~~	7	13.0	5	10.0	25	31.0	235.0	184.0
18	Timm Stade (GER)	14	20.0	11	17.0	15	21.0	12	18.0	16	22.0	~~DNF~~	~~51.0~~	PMS	51.0	18	24.0	4	8.0	27	33.0	265.0	214.0
19	George Mulin Rebello (BRA)	22	28.0	~~DNF~~	~~51.0~~	4	8.0	23	29.0	13	19.0	27	33.0	15	21.0	24	30.0	23	29.0	16	22.0	270.0	219.0
20	Wong Tak Sum (HKG)	10	16.0	30	36.0	32	38.0	26	32.0	19	25.0	10	16.0	13	19.0	6	11.7	31	37.0	~~PMS~~	~~51.0~~	281.7	230.7
21	Kaijo Kuusing (EST)	~~PMS~~	~~51.0~~	17	23.0	8	14.0	24	30.0	24	30.0	22	28.0	21	27.0	20	26.0	16	22.0	29	35.0	286.0	235.0
22	Per Gunnar Haugen (NOR)	27	33.0	~~29~~	~~35.0~~	27	33.0	18	24.0	17	23.0	25	31.0	19	25.0	19	25.0	18	24.0	10	16.0	269.0	234.0
23	João Rodrigues (POR)	25	31.0	10	16.0	18	24.0	20	26.0	22	28.0	21	27.0	24	30.0	23	29.0	~~28~~	~~34.0~~	18	24.0	269.0	235.0
24	Carlos Espínola (ARG)	17	23.0	22	28.0	22	28.0	~~PMS~~	~~51.0~~	14	20.0	23	29.0	20	26.0	12	18.0	26	32.0	26	32.0	287.0	236.0
25	Patrik Hrdina (TCH)	26	32.0	26	32.0	20	26.0	11	17.0	18	24.0	28	34.0	16	22.0	25	31.0	~~29~~	~~35.0~~	15	21.0	274.0	239.0
26	Sa-Ard Panyawan (THA)	20	26.0	27	33.0	25	31.0	~~PMS~~	~~51.0~~	8	14.0	24	30.0	18	24.0	28	34.0	36	42.0	4	8.0	293.0	242.0
27	Suh Young-keun (KOR)	21	27.0	24	30.0	~~31~~	~~37.0~~	22	28.0	26	32.0	19	25.0	30	36.0	29	35.0	9	15.0	23	29.0	294.0	257.0
28	Piotr Olewiński (POL)	30	36.0	28	34.0	23	29.0	~~PMS~~	~~51.0~~	25	31.0	PMS	51.0	23	29.0	21	27.0	15	21.0	12	18.0	327.0	276.0
29	Ansis Dāle (LAT)	24	30.0	23	29.0	~~RET~~	~~51.0~~	27	33.0	35	41.0	13	19.0	26	32.0	32	38.0	21	27.0	32	38.0	338.0	287.0
30	Jimmy Diaz (ISV)	31	37.0	20	26.0	26	32.0	25	31.0	~~36~~	~~42.0~~	26	32.0	25	31.0	26	32.0	22	28.0	36	42.0	333.0	291.0
31	Richard Paz (PHI)	28	34.0	33	39.0	24	30.0	21	27.0	23	29.0	29	35.0	22	28.0	30	36.0	~~35~~	~~41.0~~	30	36.0	335.0	294.0
32	Kutlu Torunlar (TUR)	29	35.0	16	22.0	~~33~~	~~39.0~~	28	34.0	31	37.0	32	38.0	32	38.0	31	37.0	27	33.0	34	40.0	353.0	313.0
33	Jean-Paul Fleri Soler (MLT)	33	39.0	34	40.0	30	36.0	29	35.0	29	35.0	33	39.0	31	37.0	~~35~~	~~41.0~~	30	36.0	31	37.0	375.0	334.0
34	Karim Chammari (TUN)	34	40.0	37	43.0	29	35.0	~~PMS~~	~~51.0~~	32	38.0	30	36.0	28	34.0	36	42.0	37	43.0	28	34.0	396.0	345.0
35	William Tyson (RSA)	~~37~~	~~43.0~~	31	37.0	28	34.0	31	37.0	37	43.0	31	37.0	29	35.0	37	43.0	32	38.0	37	43.0	390.0	347.0
36	Danny Adeline (SEY)	~~38~~	~~44.0~~	35	41.0	35	41.0	32	38.0	34	40.0	38	44.0	33	39.0	33	39.0	39	45.0	20	26.0	397.0	352.0
37	Roger Jurriens (ARU)	~~35~~	~~41.0~~	32	38.0	34	40.0	30	36.0	33	39.0	35	41.0	34	40.0	38	44.0	33	39.0	38	44.0	402.0	358.0
38	Constantino Saragoza (AHO)	36	42.0	~~38~~	~~44.0~~	37	43.0	33	39.0	38	44.0	34	40.0	36	42.0	34	40.0	34	40.0	35	41.0	415.0	371.0
39	Robleh Ali Adou (DJI)	32	38.0	40	46.0	38	44.0	~~PMS~~	~~51.0~~	30	36.0	37	43.0	35	41.0	39	45.0	40	46.0	33	39.0	429.0	378.0
40	Brian Talma (BAR)	39	45.0	36	42.0	36	42.0	34	40.0	~~DNC~~	~~51.0~~	36	42.0	37	43.0	40	46.0	DSQ	51.0	39	45.0	447.0	396.0
42	Jan Iriarte (GUM)	41	47.0	39	45.0	40	46.0	35	41.0	39	45.0	39	45.0	38	44.0	42	48.0	42	48.0	~~DNC~~	~~51.0~~	460.0	409.0
43	Ty Brodie (ANT)	40	46.0	41	47.0	39	45.0	DNC*	51.0	40	46.0	40	46.0	DNC	51.0	43	49.0	43	49.0	DNC	51.0	481.0	430.0
44	Graham Numa (PNG)	~~DNF~~	~~51.0~~	42	48.0	41	47.0	DNC	51.0	RET	51.0	41	47.0	DNC	51.0	41	47.0	41	47.0	DNC	51.0	491.0	440.0
45	Murray McCaig (CAN)	~~DNC~~	~~51.0~~	DNC	51.0	DNC	51.0	DNC	51.0	DNC	51.0	DNC	51.0	DNC	51.0	DNC	51.0	DNC	51.0	DNC	51.0	510.0	459.0
