= Obârșia (disambiguation) =

Obârșia may refer to several places in Romania:

- Obârșia, a commune in Olt County
- Obârșia, a village in Petriș Commune, Arad County
- Obârșia, a village in Izvoru Berheciului Commune, Bacău County
- Obârșia, a village in Dănciulești Commune, Gorj County
- Obârșia, a village in Cernișoara Commune, Vâlcea County
- Obârșia (Crușov), tributary of the Crușov in Olt County
- Obârșa, tributary of the Crișul Alb in Hunedoara County

== See also ==
- Obârșeni (disambiguation)
