= Crușov =

- Location within Romania

Location
- Country: Romania
- Counties: Olt County
- Villages: Bucinișu, Crușovu, Tia Mare

Physical characteristics
- Mouth: Olt
  - coordinates: 43.8696°N 24.6376°E
- Length: 36 km (22 mi)
- Basin size: 268 km^{2} (103 sq mi)

Basin features
- Progression: Olt→ Danube→ Black Sea
- Tributaries
  - right: Obârșia
- River code: VIII.1.179

The Crușov is a right tributary of the river Olt in Romania. It flows into the Olt in Tia Mare. Its length is 36 km (22 mi) and its basin size is 268 km^{2} (103 sq mi).
