= Vichet =

Vichet is a surname. Notable people with the surname include:

- In Vichet (born 1983), Cambodian CEO
- Um Vichet (born 1993), Cambodian footballer
- Patrick Vibert-Vichet (born 1959), French rower
