= Obârșia (Crușov) =

- Location within Romania

Location
- Country: Romania
- Counties: Olt County
- Villages: Obârșia, Vădastra, Vișina

Physical characteristics
- Mouth: Crușov
  - coordinates: 43.8670°N 24.6131°E
- Length: 32 km (20 mi)
- Basin size: 129 km^{2} (50 sq mi)

Basin features
- Progression: Crușov→ Olt→ Danube→ Black Sea
- River code: VIII.1.179.1

The Obârșia is a right tributary of the river Crușov in Romania. It flows into the Crușov near Tia Mare. Its length is 32 km (20 mi) and its basin size is 129 km^{2} (50 sq mi).
