= Potlogeni =

Potlogeni may refer to several places in Romania:

- Potlogeni, a village in Tia Mare Commune, Olt County
- Potlogeni-Deal, a village in Petreşti Commune, Dâmboviţa County
- Potlogeni-Vale, a village in Crângurile Commune, Dâmboviţa County
