= Torell =

Torell is a surname. Notable people called Torell include:

- Knut Torell (1885–1966), Swedish Olympic gymnast
- Magnus Torell (born 1964), Swedish windsurfer
- Otto Martin Torell HFRSE (1828–1900), Swedish naturalist and geologist
- Tore Torell (1941–2018), Norwegian magician and illusionist
- William Torell, 13th century English sculptor
- Torell Troup (born 1988), American professional football player

== See also ==
- Torell Land, land area at the southeast part of Spitsbergen, Svalbard
- Sharp Torell Basket Liga, professional women's club basketball league in Poland
