= Virkus =

Virkus is a surname. Notable people with the surname include:

- Scott Virkus (born 1959), American football player.
- Tarmo Virkus (born 1971), Estonian rower.
- Juhan Virkus (1937–1996), Estonian radio journalist and actor.
