= Denis Žvegelj =

Slovenian rower

Medal record

Men's rowing

Representing Yugoslavia

World Rowing Championships
Silver medal – second place	1991 Vienna	Coxless pair

Representing Slovenia

Olympic Games
Bronze medal – third place	1992 Barcelona	Coxless pair

World Rowing Championships
Bronze medal – third place	1993 Račice	Coxless pair

Denis Žvegelj (born 24 June 1972) is an ex-Slovenian rower and Olympic medallist. He was born in Jesenice, SR Slovenia.

== Rowing career ==
Žvegelj started rowing at the age of 12 at local rowing club in his hometown Bled. Serious rowing racing started in the coxless pair with Iztok Čop, when they won two junior world championships (1989, 1990). They finished 2nd in the World Championships in 1991, and won Bronze at the Barcelona Olympics in 1992 with Čop (the first Olympic medal for independent Slovenia). In 1993 Žvegelj and Iztok took bronze despite Žvegelj's severe shoulder injury after a bicycle accident. Žvegelj studied at Brown University where he rowed and studied Mechanical Engineering. He was member of Brown's varsity eight, which won National Collegiate Rowing Championship in years 1994 and 1995.

After return for summer holidays in 1994, he was in a car crash that prevented him from finishing the rowing season Čop. A few months later, another rower, Sašo Mirjanič from Slovenian four, died in car accident. So next year Žvegelj joined three boys to qualify for the 1996 Olympics. They took 4th in a close fours race, where all six boats were even almost from start to finish line. That scenario repeated in WRC in France, when Slovenia was called to pick up bronze medal, and later (after detail photo finish examination) moved to 4th place. Due to back problems, he ended his rowing career.

=== Olympic Games ===
- 1992: Barcelona (SPA) – 3rd place (coxless pair with Iztok Čop)
- 1996: Atlanta (USA) – 4th place (coxless four with Sadik Mujkić, Milan Janša, Jani Klemenčič)

=== World Rowing Junior Championships ===
- 1989: Szeged (HUN) – 1st place (coxless pair with Iztok Čop)
- 1990: Aiguebelette (FRA) – 1st place (coxless pair with Iztok Čop)

=== World Championships ===
- 1990: Lake Barrington (AUS) – 7th place (coxless four with Sadik Mujkić, Bojan Prešern, Iztok Čop)
- 1991: Vienna (AUT) – 2nd place (coxless pair with Iztok Čop)
- 1993: Roudnice (CZE) – 3rd place (coxless pair with Iztok Čop)
- 1995: Tampere (FIN) – 8th place (coxless four with Sadik Mujkić, Milan Janša, Jani Klemenčič)
- 1997: Aiguebelette (FRA) – 4th place (coxless four with Sadik Mujkić, Milan Janša, Jani Klemenčič)

== Career ==
Žvegelj then focused in working with his father in their design firm Basing in Jesenice, which moved to Bled in January 2006.

In 1998 he founded an engineering firm Basing. On 16 March 2009 he was elected President of Slovenian Rowing Federation for 2009–2013. From 2012 to 2014 he was the CEO of Vile Bled. In 2015 he founded Revive Temple Bled.

In 2012 he formed a small Hotel chain at the lake Bled Vile Bled and later extended his work to alternative healing to promote bio-energy healing and learning. In 2015 he began running independent healing, revitalizing and learning center Revive Temple Bled to promote healthy life style and self-healing through proper nutrition, use of bio-energy and detoxification.

== Personal life ==
Žvegelj is a father of three sons Gal (17 March 1994), Maksim (25 September 1998) and Isak (3 July 2000) and lives in his hometown of Bled.
