= Verschoor =

Verschoor is a Dutch toponymic surname. It is a contraction of van der Schoor, more or less meaning "from the shore". Notable people with the surname include:

- Annie Romein-Verschoor (1895–1978), Dutch writer and historian
- Bart Verschoor (born 1965), Dutch competitive sailor
- George Verschoor (born 1960), American television producer
- Hermanus Eliza Verschoor (1791–1877), Dutch politician
- Maria Verschoor (born 1994), Dutch field hockey player
- Martijn Verschoor (born 1985), Dutch road racing cyclist
- Matthijs Verschoor (born 1955), Dutch classical pianist
- Monica Verschoor (born 1950), Dutch pop singer and pianist
- Richard Verschoor (born 2000), Dutch racing driver
- Sandy Verschoor (born 1959), Australian politician
- Thayer Verschoor (born 1961), American (Arizona) politician

Verschoore

- Omer Verschoore (1888–1931), Belgian road racing cyclist
- Patrick J. Verschoore (born 1943), American (Illinois) politician

== See also ==
- Van Schoor, related surname
