= Lee Han-lim =

Lee Han-lim may refer to:

- Lee Han-lim (general) (1921–2012), South Korean general
- Lee Han-im (born 1969), South Korean windsurfer, also known as Lee Han-lim.
