= Luke Baldauf =

United States Virgin Islands windsurfer

Personal information
- Full name: Luke Thomas Baldauf
- Nationality: American Virgin Islander
- Born: January 2, 1969 (age 56); Christiansted
- Height: 173 cm (5 ft 8 in)
- Weight: 67 kg (148 lb)

Sailing career
- Class: Division II

Luke Thomas Baldauf (also spelled Bauldauf, born January 2, 1969) is a windsurfer who represented the United States Virgin Islands. He competed in the Division II event at the 1988 Summer Olympics.
