= Didier Gamerdinger =

Monegasque windsurfer (born 1959)

Personal information
- Nationality: Monegasque
- Born: 1 October 1959 (age 65)
- Height: 170 cm (5 ft 7 in)
- Weight: 68 kg (150 lb)

Sailing career
- Class: Lechner Division II

Didier Gamerdinger (born 1 October 1959) is a Monegasque windsurfer. He competed in the men's Division II event at the 1988 Summer Olympics.
