= Grzegorz Myszkowski =

Polish windsurfer

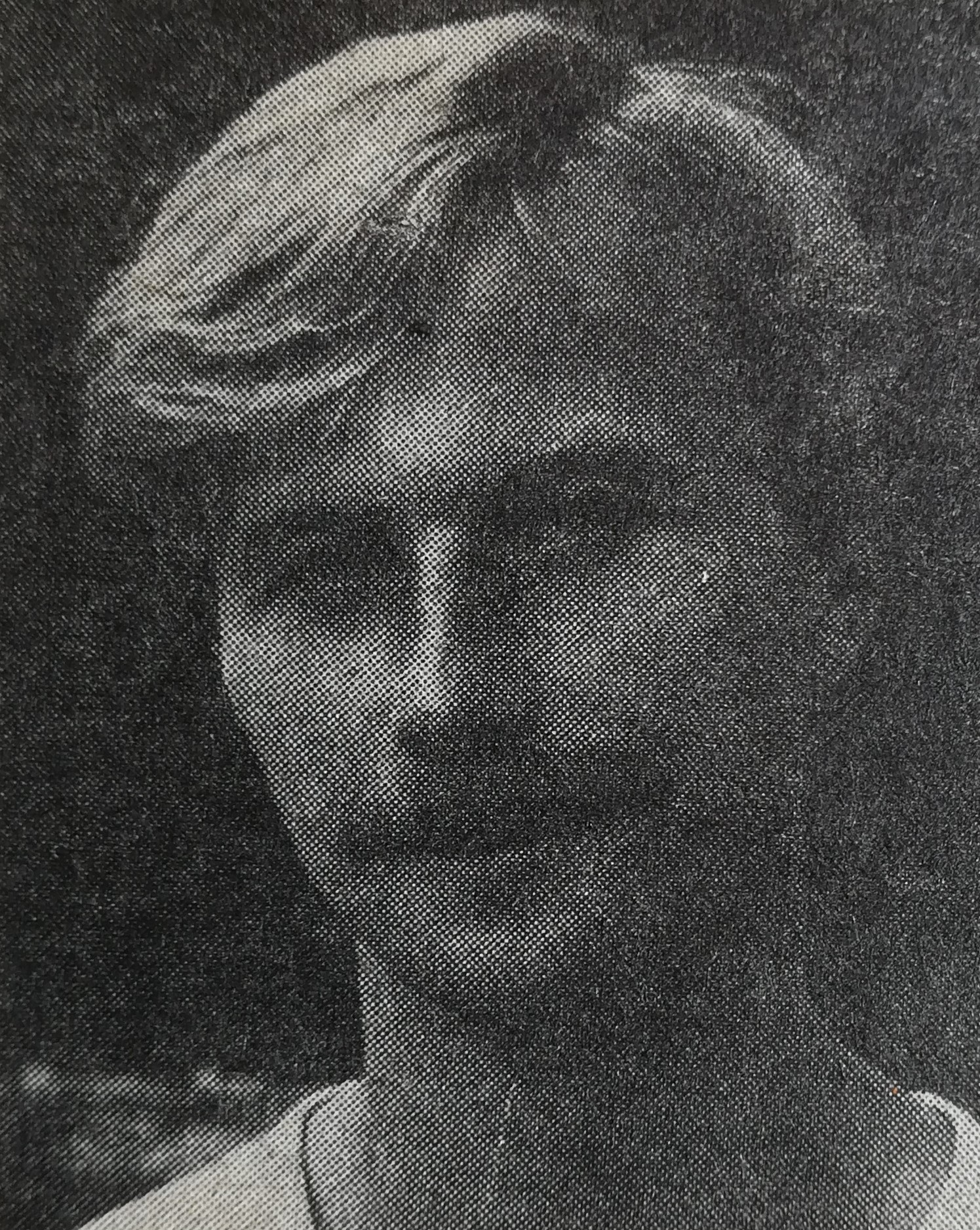

Personal information
- Full name: Grzegorz Marek Myszkowski
- Born: 18 April 1961 (age 63); Poznań, Poland
- Height: 177 cm (5 ft 10 in)
- Weight: 67 kg (148 lb)

Sailing career
- Class: Lechner Division II
- Club: JKW Poznań

Grzegorz Marek Myszkowski (born 18 April 1961) is a Polish windsurfer. He competed in the men's Division II event at the 1988 Summer Olympics, finishing in 17th place.
