= Patrick Manning (disambiguation) =

Patrick Manning (1946–2016) was Prime Minister of Trinidad and Tobago.

Patrick Manning may also refer to:

- Patrick Manning (historian) (born 1941), American academic historian
- Patrick R. Manning (born 1965), former American politician
- Patrick Manning (rower) (born 1967), American rower
