= Mohamed Al-Kaabi =

Mohamed Al-Kaabi may refer to:

- Mohamed Faraj Al-Kaabi (born 1984), Qatari hammer thrower
- Mohamed Al-Kaabi (windsurfer) (born 1957), Qatari windsurfer
