= Coteni =

Coteni may refer to several villages in Romania:

- Coteni, a village in Buhoci Commune, Bacău County
- Coteni, a village in Bulbucata Commune, Giurgiu County
- Coteni, a village in Obârșia Commune, Olt County
