= Carlos Iniesta =

Spanish windsurfer

Personal information
- Birth name: Carlos Iniesta Mira
- Nationality: Spanish
- Born: 4 November 1966 (age 58); Alicante, Spain

Sport
- Sport: Windsurfing

Carlos Iniesta Mira (Note: In this Spanish name, the first or paternal surname is Iniesta and the second or maternal family name is Mira.) (born 4 November 1966) is a Spanish windsurfer. He competed in the Division II event at the 1988 Summer Olympics.
