= Barrie Edgington =

British windsurfer

Personal information
- Full name: Barrie James Edgington
- Born: 30 March 1967 (age 59) Wokingham, England
- Height: 184 cm (6 ft 0 in)
- Weight: 68 kg (150 lb)

Sailing career
- Sport: Sailing
- Club: Hayling Island Sailing Club
- Class(es): Lechner, Funboard, Raceboard

Barrie James Edgington (sometimes spelled Edginton, born 30 March 1967) is a British windsurfer. He competed in the men's Lechner A-390 event at the 1992 Summer Olympics. He is a member of the iQFOIL Executive Committee.
