= Viktor Pitirimov =

Soviet rower

Personal information
- Nationality: Soviet
- Born: 2 June 1968 (age 56)

Sport
- Sport: Rowing

Viktor Pitirimov (born 2 June 1968) is a Soviet rower. He competed in the men's coxless four event at the 1992 Summer Olympics. His daughter, Ekaterina, rowed at the 2020 Summer Olympics.
