= Paul Van Den Abeele =

Belgian windsurfer (born 1965)

Personal information
- Nationality: Belgian
- Born: 10 May 1965 (age 59); Ghent, Belgium

Sport
- Sport: Windsurfing

Paul Van Den Abeele (born 10 May 1965) is a Belgian windsurfer. He competed in the men's Lechner A-390 event at the 1992 Summer Olympics.
