= Vasile Hanuseac =

Romanian rower

Personal information
- Nationality: Romanian
- Born: 3 April 1970 (age 56)

Sport
- Sport: Rowing

Vasile Hanuseac (born 3 April 1970) is a Romanian rower. He competed in the men's coxless four event at the 1992 Summer Olympics.
