= Håkon Nissen-Lie =

Norwegian windsurfer

Personal information
- Full name: Håkon Martinus Nissen-Lie
- Nationality: Norwegian
- Born: 26 March 1964 (age 61) Asker, Norway
- Height: 185 cm (6 ft 1 in)
- Weight: 70 kg (154 lb)

Sport
- Sport: Windsurfing

Håkon Martinus Nissen-Lie (born 26 March 1964) is a Norwegian former windsurfer. He competed in the men's Division II event at the 1988 Summer Olympics.
