= Jan Bonga =

Swiss windsurfer

Personal information
- Nationality: Swiss
- Born: 23 July 1964 (age 60)
- Height: 188 cm (6 ft 2 in)
- Weight: 73 kg (161 lb)

Sport
- Sport: Windsurfing

Jan Bonga (born 23 July 1964) is a Swiss windsurfer. He competed in the Division II event at the 1988 Summer Olympics.
