= Nikolay Kravchenko =

Soviet windsurfer

Personal information
- Nationality: Soviet
- Born: 27 July 1956 (age 69)

Sport
- Sport: Windsurfing

Nikolay Kravchenko (born 27 July 1956) is a Soviet windsurfer. He competed in the men's Division II event at the 1988 Summer Olympics.
