= Juan Aguirre (rower) =

Spanish rower

Personal information
- Full name: Juan Luis Aguirre Barco
- Born: 30 December 1970 (age 55) Villanueva del Río y Minas, Spain

Sport
- Country: Spain
- Sport: Rowing
- Club: Labradores Rowing Club
Medal record
World Championships
Silver medal – second place	2002 Seville	Lwt quad scull (LM4x)
Bronze medal – third place	2000 Zagreb	Lwt quad scull (LM4x)
Bronze medal – third place	1991 Vienna	Lwt coxless four (LM4-)
Summer Universiade
Silver medal – second place	1989 Duisburg	Lwt coxless fours

Juan Luis Aguirre Barco (Note: In this Spanish name, the first or paternal surname is Aguirre and the second or maternal family name is Barco.) (born 30 December 1970) is a Spanish rower. He competed in the men's coxless four event at the 1992 Summer Olympics.
