= Karim Chammari =

Tunisian windsurfer and sport science researcher. (born 1966)

Karim Chamari
Personal information
- Nationality: Tunisian
- Born: 5 March 1966 (age 59)

Sport
- Sport: Windsurfing

Karim Chammari (Arabic: كريم شماري, born 5 March 1966) is a Tunisian windsurfer. He competed in the men's Lechner A-390 event at the 1992 Summer Olympics.
