= William Tyson =

South African windsurfer

Personal information
- Nationality: South African
- Born: 17 May 1971 (age 54)

Sport
- Sport: Windsurfing

William Tyson (born 17 May 1971) is a South African windsurfer. He competed in the men's Lechner A-390 event at the 1992 Summer Olympics.
