= Olympic Committee of Slovenia =

National Olympic Committee

Olympic Committee of Slovenia – Association of Sports Federations
- Country: Slovenia
- Code: SLO
- Created: 15 October 1991
- Recognized: 17 January 1992
- Continental Association: EOC
- Headquarters: Ljubljana, Slovenia
- President: Franjo Bobinac
- Secretary General: Edvard Kolar
- Website: www.olympic.si

The Olympic Committee of Slovenia – Association of Sports Federations (Slovene: Olimpijski komite Slovenije – Združenje športnih zvez; OKS; IOC Code: SLO) ensures the participation of Slovenian athletes at the Olympic Games, the Mediterranean Games, and the European Youth Olympic Festival. The Committee gathers 39 national sports federations governing various sports in Slovenia, who elect the Committee's executive council, which is composed of president and 21 council members.

== History ==
Following Slovenia's independence from Yugoslavia in 1991, the National Olympic Committee was established on 15 October 1991, and was officially admitted as a member of the International Olympic Committee (IOC) on 17 January 1992, which allowed Slovenian athletes to compete at the 1992 Winter Olympics in Albertville, France.

== Presidents ==
President	Term
Janez Kocijančič	1991–2014
Bogdan Gabrovec	2014–2022
Franjo Bobinac	2022–present

== Executive committee ==
The committee of the NOC SLO is represented by:

- President: Franjo Bobinac
- Honorary President: Janez Kocijančič
- Vice Presidents: Janez Sodržnik, Iztok Čop, Tomaž Barada
- Members: Gregor Benčina, Ivan Levak, Tjaša Andree Prosenc, Metod Ropret, Matej Erjavec, Stanko Glažar, Rok Vehovec, Bojan Rotovnik, Milan Žvan, Tomo Tiringer, Branko Žnidarič, Miran Kos, Dejan Crnek, Martina Ratej, Miroslav Cerar, Damjan Lazar, Vojka Ravbar

== Member federations ==
The Slovenian National Federations are the organizations that coordinate all aspects of their individual sports. They are responsible for training, competition and development of their sports. There are currently 32 Olympic Summer and 7 Winter Sport Federations in Slovenia.

National Federation	Summer or Winter	Headquarters
Alpine Association of Slovenia	Winter	Ljubljana
Archery Association of Slovenia	Summer	Ljubljana
Athletic Federation of Slovenia	Summer	Ljubljana
Badminton Association of Slovenia	Summer	Medvode
Baseball and Softball Association of Slovenia	Summer	Ljubljana
Basketball Federation of Slovenia	Summer	Ljubljana
Slovenian Bobsleigh Federation	Winter	Domžale
Slovenian Boxing Association	Summer	Piran
Canoe Federation of Slovenia	Summer	Ljubljana
Slovenian Curling Association	Winter	Ljubljana
Slovenian Cycling Federation	Summer	Ljubljana
Equestrian Federation of Slovenia	Summer	Ljubljana
Fencing Federation of Slovenia	Summer	Maribor
Alliance for Field Hockey of Slovenia	Summer	Murska Sobota
Football Association of Slovenia	Summer	Kranj
Golf Association of Slovenia	Summer	Ljubljana
Gymnastics Federation of Slovenia	Summer	Ljubljana
Handball Federation of Slovenia	Summer	Ljubljana
Ice Hockey Federation of Slovenia	Winter	Ljubljana
Slovenian Judo Federation	Summer	Slovenska Bistrica
Karate Federation of Slovenia	Summer	Trbovlje
Slovenian Luge Association	Winter	Jesenice
Slovenian Federation for Roller Skating	Summer	Ljubljana
Slovenian Rowing Federation	Summer	Bled
Slovenian Rugby Union	Summer	Ljubljana
Slovenian Sailing Federation	Summer	Koper
Shooting Union of Slovenia	Summer	Ljubljana
Slovenian Skating Union	Winter	Ljubljana
Ski Association of Slovenia	Winter	Ljubljana
Association of Slovenian Surfers	Summer	Ljubljana
Slovenian Swimming Federation	Summer	Ljubljana
Slovenian Tennis Association	Summer	Ljubljana
Slovenian Table Tennis Association	Summer	Ljubljana
Slovenian Taekwondo Association	Summer	Celje
Slovenian Triathlon Federation	Summer	Ljubljana
Volleyball Federation of Slovenia	Summer	Ljubljana
Slovenian Water Polo Clubs Federation	Summer	Brezovica
Slovenian Weightlifting Federation	Summer	Ljubljana
Wrestling Federation of Slovenia	Summer	Murska Sobota

== See also ==
- Slovenia at the Olympics
