= Rocco Pecoraro =

Italian rower

Personal information
- Nationality: Italian
- Born: 6 January 1970 (age 56) Baronissi, Italy

Sport
- Sport: Rowing
Medal record
Representing Italy
World Championships
| Bronze medal – third place | 1995 Tampere | Coxed fours |
Summer Universiade
| Gold medal – first place | 1989 Duisburg | Eights |

Rocco Pecoraro (born 6 January 1970) is an Italian rower. He competed in the men's coxless four event at the 1992 Summer Olympics.
