= Obârșeni =

Obârșeni may refer to several villages in Romania:

- Obârșeni, a village in Vinderei Commune, Vaslui County
- Obârșeni, a village in Voinești Commune, Vaslui County

== See also ==
- Obârșia (disambiguation)
