= Bart Verschoor =

Dutch windsurfer (born 1965)

Personal information
- Full name: Bartolomeus Verschoor
- Nationality: Dutch
- Born: 17 May 1965 (age 61) Loenersloot
- Height: 1.78 m (5.8 ft)

Sailing career
- Sport: Sailing
- Class: Division II
- Updated on 26 February 2014

Bartolomeus "Bart" Verschoor (born 17 May 1965, in Loenersloot) is a sailor from the Netherlands, who represented his country at the 1988 Summer Olympics in Pusan. Verschoor took the 4th place in the Division II.

== Professional life ==
Verschoor is a selfmade man who, after his Olympic career, started building home and boat related products from sustainable materials.
