= Florin Ene =

Romanian rower

Personal information
- Full name: Florin Daniel Ene
- Nationality: Romanian
- Born: 12 April 1970 (age 54)

Sport
- Sport: Rowing

Florin Ene (born 12 April 1970) is a Romanian rower. He competed in the men's coxless four event at the 1992 Summer Olympics.
