= Ryo Asano =

Japanese windsurfer

Personal information
- Nationality: Japanese
- Born: 8 July 1963 (age 61)

Sport
- Sport: Windsurfing

Ryo Asano (born 8 July 1963) is a Japanese windsurfer. He competed in the men's Division II event at the 1988 Summer Olympics.
