= Christopher Lawrence (windsurfer) =

Australian windsurfer

Personal information
- Nickname: Chris
- Nationality: Australian
- Born: Terrigal, New South Wales, Australia

Sport
- Sport: Windsurfing

Christopher Lawrence (born 30 March 1968) is an Australian windsurfer. He competed in the Division II event at the 1988 Summer Olympics.

- Australian Windsurfing Champion
- European Olympic Class Champion
- World Youth Windsurfing Champion
- 6 X World Windsurfing Champion
