= İbrahim Kakış =

Turkish windsurfer

Personal information
- Nationality: Turkish
- Born: 21 July 1959 (age 65)

Sport
- Sport: Windsurfing

İbrahim Kakış (born 21 July 1959) is a Turkish windsurfer. He competed in the men's Division II event at the 1988 Summer Olympics.
