= Bart Peters =

Dutch rower

Personal information
- Nationality: Dutch
- Born: 2 August 1965 (age 59); Amsterdam, Netherlands

Sport
- Sport: Rowing

Bart Peters (born 2 August 1965) is a Dutch rower. He competed in the men's coxless four event at the 1992 Summer Olympics.
