= Per Haugen =

Norwegian windsurfer

Personal information
- Nationality: Norwegian
- Born: 20 April 1970 (age 56) Oslo, Norway

Sport
- Sport: Windsurfing

Per Gunnar Haugen (born 20 April 1970) is a Norwegian windsurfer. He was born in Oslo. He participated in the Lechner A-390 class at the 1992 Summer Olympics in Barcelona, where he placed 22nd.
