= Osvaldo Alcaide =

Puerto Rican windsurfer (born 1965)

Personal information
- Nationality: Puerto Rican
- Born: 26 May 1965 (age 61)

Sport
- Sport: Windsurfing

Osvaldo Alcaide (born 26 May 1965) is a Puerto Rican windsurfer. He competed in the men's Division II event at the 1988 Summer Olympics.
