= Cedric Burgers =

Canadian rower

Personal information
- Nationality: Canadian
- Born: 16 April 1970 (age 54); Vancouver, British Columbia, Canada

Sport
- Sport: Rowing

Cedric Burgers (born 16 April 1970) is a Canadian rower. He competed in the men's coxless four event at the 1992 Summer Olympics.
