= Eli Fuller =

Antigua and Barbuda windsurfer

Personal information
- Full name: Eli James M. Fuller
- Nationality: Antigua and Barbuda
- Born: 27 August 1972 (age 53) London, England

Sport
- Sport: Windsurfing

Eli James M. Fuller born 27 August 1972) is an Antigua and Barbuda windsurfer. He competed in the men's Division II event at the 1988 Summer Olympics.
