= Asier Fernández =

Spanish windsurfer

Personal information
- Full name: Asier Fernández de Bobadilla Rola
- Nationality: Spanish
- Born: 22 June 1972 (age 52); Bilbao, Spain

Sport
- Sport: Windsurfing

Asier Fernández de Bobadilla Rola (born 22 June 1972) is a Spanish windsurfer. He competed in the men's Lechner A-390 event at the 1992 Summer Olympics.
