= Dumitru Găleșanu =

Romanian jurist and author

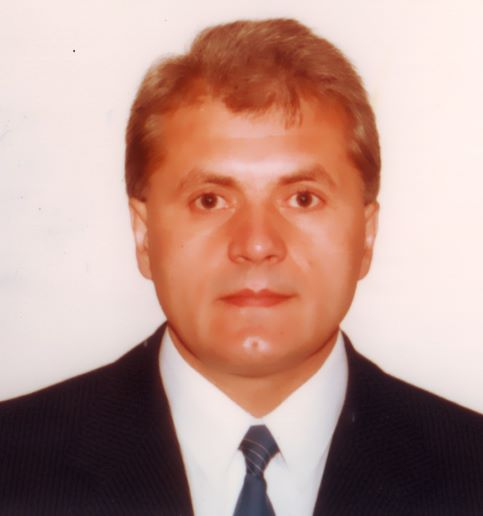
- Dumitru Găleșanu
- Born: 5 December 1955 (age 70); Potlogeni, Olt County, Romania
- Education: Babeș-Bolyai University
- Occupations: Judge, writer, poet, philosopher, essayist, illustrator
- Writing career
- Language: Romanian, Italian, English
- Genres: Philosophical poetry, lyric poetry, free verse, essay, memoir
- Movements: 80s Generation, postmodernism

Dumitru Găleșanu (Romanian pronunciation: [duˈmitru gəleʃanu]; born December 5, 1955, Potlogeni village, Tia Mare commune, Olt County) is a Romanian jurist and author, a postmodern writer, poet-philosopher, essayist, editor and book illustrator, known for his contributions to postmodern literature, and for his judicial activity in the Romanian justice system. He served as magistrate judge for more than 24 years within the Romanian courts of law.

== Biography ==
=== Childhood years and primary education ===
Dumitru Găleșanu was born on December 5, 1955, in Potlogeni, a village in the southern area of the Romanian Plain, on the right bank of the Olt River and included in the historical region of Romania known as Oltenia (Lesser Wallachia), into a family of agricultural workers consisting of his parents, Ion and Aurica Găleșanu. He spent his childhood in his native village, where he also attended the Primary school and Gymnasium school for 1st–8th grades.

As a result of graduating in his youth in the field of legal sciences, he worked for a long period in the legal field, of which, for over 24 years, only in the judicial system of Romania, dedicating himself at the same time to literary creation and philosophy. Most of his works have been written and published successively in the form of poems, in a metaphysical poetic language with postmodern stylistic influences.

=== Secondary education, pre-judicial career ===
After graduating from the Primary school and lower Secondary school, he passed the exam taken to continue his pre-university education at Grupul Școlar de Chimie din Craiova, later became Liceul Tehnologic "Costin D. Nenițescu" din Craiova.

After the three-year vocational school in Craiova, in the autumn of 1973 he was enrolled as a student at Liceul de Matematică-Fizică "Vasile Roaită" in Râmnicu Vâlcea, later transformed into Colegiul Național "Mircea cel Bătrân" (Râmnicu Vâlcea). Between 1975 and 1976, he interrupted high school to perform compulsory military service at a military aviation unit within the Ministry of National Defense of Romania. Resuming his studies, he graduated from this educational institution and obtained his baccalaureate diploma in 1979.

Between 1973 and 1978 he worked at Centrala Industrială de Produse Anorganice in Râmnicu Vâlcea, currently Oltchim SA, and then at Întreprinderea Județeană de Gospodărie Comunală și Locativă Vâlcea, until November 1, 1989, after which he entered into the Judiciary of Romania.

=== Undergraduate and postgraduate education. Judicial career ===
Between 1981 and 1986 he attended the Faculty of Law of the Babeș-Bolyai University in Cluj-Napoca. After obtaining his bachelor's degree in legal sciences, the specialization Law, he held various positions, including the profession of jurisconsult.

Then, he completed his training as a judge through continuous professional development, particularly for a deeper understanding of relevant judicial practices, based on the application of national legislation, as well as on the integrated regulatory system of the European Union, participating in courses and seminars mainly organized by the National Institute of Magistracy of Romania. In the same context, between 2003 and 2004, he also attended a postgraduate course for specialization and improvement in the field of civil law and commercial law, organized by the Faculty of Law of Babeș-Bolyai University, at the end of which he obtained his graduation diploma in 2004.

Between 2004 and 2006 he continued with a master's degree in law (M.L./LL.M), at the Lucian Blaga University of Sibiu (ULBS), "Simion Bărnuțiu" Faculty of Law, and upon completion of these studies he obtained the specialization in Romanian Private law Institutions.

Starting in 1989 he followed his professional career in the Romanian judicial system, holding the position of magistrate-judge, initially at the Mixed Section of the Râmnicu Vâlcea Court (judecătorie), in the judicial panels for criminal law and civil law, until November 1, 1997, and then at the Vâlcea County Tribunal, where he continued to practice as a judge at Civil Section I, until September 3, 2014, the date on which he ceased his judicial activity by retirement.

During the same period, he was affiliated as a member of the professional organization Asociația Magistraților din România (A.M.R.) – Filiala Vâlcea.

In the legal field, he has published studies and specialized articles, some of which are included in the volume 1st International Congress on Foundational Research in Law and Philosophy of Law: Bucharest, 28–29 May 2005, as well as in Revista critică de drept și de filosofia dreptului ("Critical Magazine of Law and the Philosophy of Law"), Vol.2, No.1-2/2005.

=== Publicistic ===
In addition to legal specialty articles related to his profession and field of activity, Dumitru Găleșanu contributed with poems, literary chronicles, reviews, journalism, essays, and digital paintings from his own creation, published in various cultural, artistic, and literary magazines, including: Armonii Culturale (Adjud); Noua Provincia Corvina (Hunedoara); Banchetul (Petroșani); Lumina Lumii (Râmnicu Vâlcea); Oltart (Slatina); Il Convivio, Cultura e Prospettive (Castiglione di Sicilia); New York Magazin, Gracious Light/Lumină Lină (New York City); Destine Literare (Montreal).

=== Literary-artistic and cultural affiliations ===
Complementary to his individual literary, artistic, and publishing activities, Dumitru Găleșanu has been associated and collaborated over time, as a member, with various socio-cultural nonprofit organizations, including: Societatea Literară "Anton Pann" in Ramnicu Valcea, Associazione Culturale "Euterpe" APS in Jesi, and Accademia Internazionale "Il Convivio" in Castiglione di Sicilia.

=== Literary and philosophical works, literary debut, philosophical poetics ===
Associated with postmodernism in Romanian literature, as well as with the literary movement of Romanian writers in the 1980s, called "The 1980s generation" (optzecism) or "The generation in blues jeans" (in Romanian: Generația optzeci/optzecistă, generația în blugi), Dumitru Găleșanu started his creative work in this field back when he was a student and continued during his university studies, managing to create a variety of literary works, including poems and essays, which were published after the Romanian Revolution of 1989.

At the literary debut, that took place in the year 2010, with the publication of the volume of lyrical-philosophical poems Emoții în Multivers, a bilingual Romanian-English edition, the literary criticism reproached him that at sometimes he allows himself to be ''seduced by the marvelous dance of ideas'' and that ''the density of abstractions'' in relation to the Poetic determines that some texts ''transforming into fields of confrontation, often dramatic, between the will to power (into expression!) of the Poetical and that (into abstraction!) of the Philosophical.''

Dumitru Găleșanu became known as a writer and philosophical poet due to his lyrical-philosophical poems with cosmological and metaphysical influences, where he speculated on the latest achievements of contemporary exact sciences, particularly in the cutting-edge fields of modern physics, as well as for his ability to explore existential themes related to being and the meaning of life, but also sensitive human themes such as love and emotional contrasts, as is the case with the poems included in some of his volumes, among which: Emoții în Multivers, Pe corzile luminii, Însemnele materiei,Ante*metafizica: antologie lirică, etc.

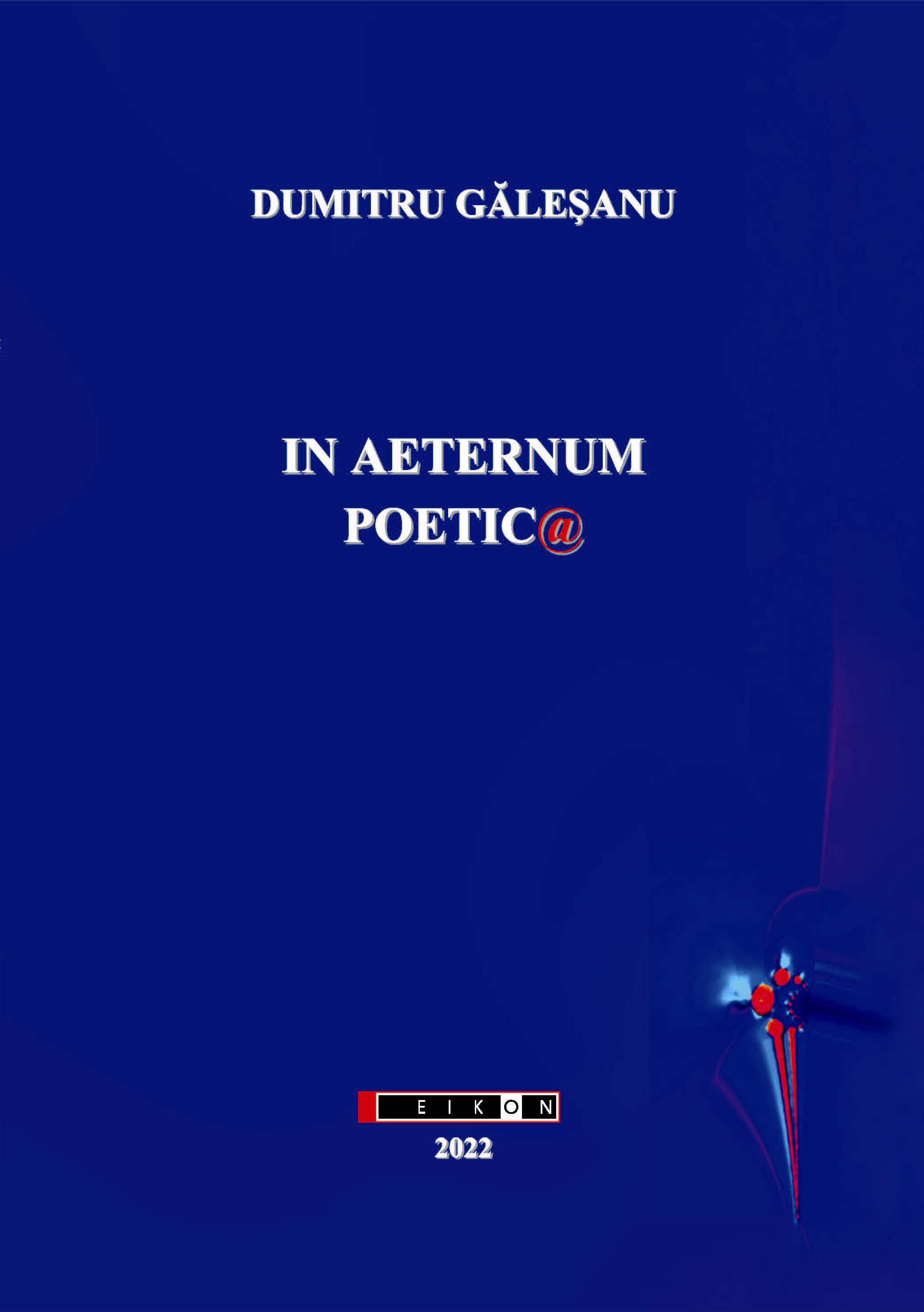
Dumitru Găleșanu, In aeternum poetic@, Eikon, Bucharest, 2022

His literary style is characterized by a unique poetic sensitivity and a certain musical expressiveness, as well as by a particular rhetoric, his writings being founded on a complex observation of the realities of the surrounding world and human nature. Moreover, the graphic arrangement of the verses in most of his poetic texts is probably related to the special technique of the calligrams of Guillaume Apollinaire, the famous surrealist French poet, author of the book entitled Calligrammes.

Găleșanu's most famous work is Luminile omului: lirica filosofică, a poetic-philosophical volume written in Romanian during the COVID-19 pandemic and published in 2020, whose original version was subsequently translated and published in both English and Italian.

Philosophically, Găleșanu's poetic art and its cosmological themes in the Romanian literature context have contributed to the affirmation of the contemporary poetry genre known as cosmodern poetry: "Dumitru Găleșanu proves to be a fervent advocate of cosmodernity," wrote literary critic Mircea Martin, "the very logic of his poetry tends to be cosmodern one."

In the same context, in an article written in the year 2014 on the occasion of the publication of the first edition]of the volume "The Insignias of Matter", literary critic Ioan Groșan also remarked that: "The austere and cold universe is thus identified with a space that can be fertilized by the interstellar projection of the poet's individuality", he concluding at the end: "Dumitru Găleşanu is an Erich von Däniken of the poetry of the cosmos, in the sense of revealing its in an unprecedented way."

=== Awards and distinctions ===
- International Competition Prize "Poetry, Prose and Figurative Arts" and Theater Prize "Angelo Musco" (2016).
- "National Poetry Prize Competition" (2018).
- National Literary Competition (2019).

== Published books ==
- Emoții în multivers/Emotions into multiverse (2010).
- Pe corzile luminii/Sulle stringhe di luce ["On the Strings of Light"] (2011).
- Fugă spre roșu/Fuggire verso il rosso ["Run toward red"] (2012).
- Însemnele materiei/Insegne della materia ["The Insignias of Matter"] (2013).
- Addéndum (2014).
- Ante*metafizica: antologie lirică de autor. Ediția I ["Ante*metaphysics. Author's lyrical anthology. First Edition"] (2015).
- Tratat pentru nemurire/Trattato per l’immortalità ["Treatiste for Immortality"] (2016).
- Axiomele infinității/Assiomi dell’infinità ["The Axioms of Infinity"] (2017).
- Ante*metafizica: antologie lirică. Ediția a 2-a, revizuită și adăugită ["Ante*metaphysics: lyrical anthology. 2nd Edition, revised and added"] (2018).
- Poetică metafizică/Poetica metafisica ["Metaphysical Poetics"] (2019).
- Luminile omului: lirica filosofică (2020).
- The Lights of Man: the philosophical lyric poetry (2021).
- Le luci dellʼuomo: lirica filosofica (2021).
- In aeternum poetic@ (2022).
- Mirabile iubiri. Antologie de gânduri și amintiri/Mirabili amori. Antologia di pensieri e ricordi (2023).

=== Literary anthologies. Bibliography ===
Some of his poetic and philosophical works are presented in several authoritative anthologies, including in: Ziua Mondială a Poeziei. Maratonul de Poezie, Blues și Jazz (2012), Meridiane Lirice – Antologie Universală a Poeziei Românești Contemporane (124 Poeți contemporani) (2012), Antologia scriitorilor români contemporani din întreaga lume. Starpress 2014/Lʼantologia degli scrittori romeni contemporanei di tutto il mondo intero (2014), Poemas Peregrinos. Antología de poesía rumana contemporánea (2023), Antologia Rumänische Lyrikanthologie - Von den Anfängen bis heute, Band VI (2024), etc.

He is also included in encyclopedias and dictionaries published in Romania, such as: MILENARIUM. Dicționarul enciclopedic al scriitorilor români la începutul mileniului al III-lea, vol.I (2021) [MILENARIUM. The encyclopedic dictionary of Romanian writers at the beginning of the 3rd millennium, Vol.I], and Enciclopedia Scriitori din Generația 2000, vol. II (2021).

=== Gallery ===
Some of the digital paintings created over time by Dumitru Găleșanu have been published (as original graphic illustrations) in the content pages of some of his important books, including: Luminile omului: lirica filosofică (2022), In aeternum poetic@ (2022), and Mirabile iubiri. Antologie de gânduri și amintiri (2023), etc.

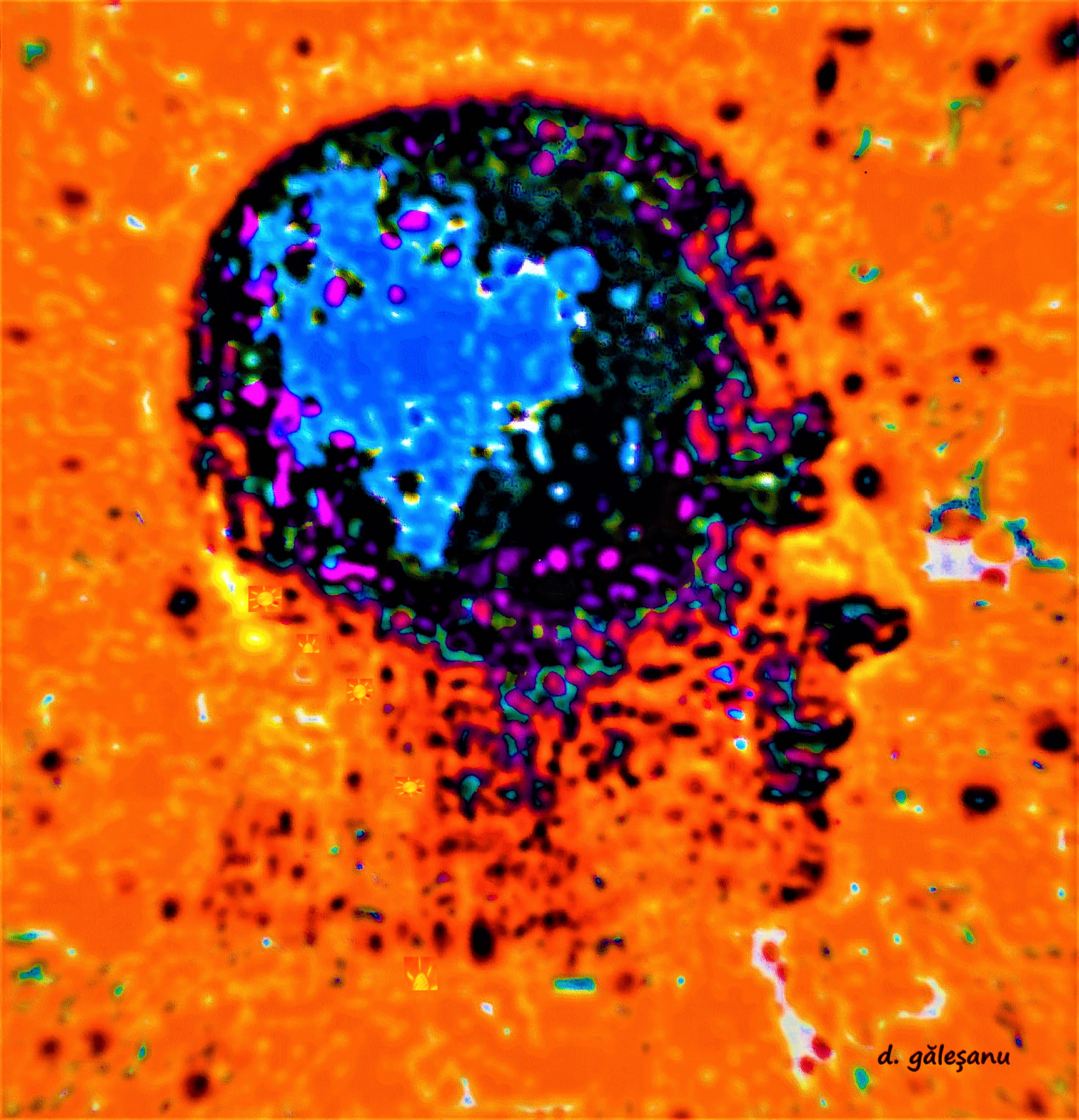
Art portrait (2022)

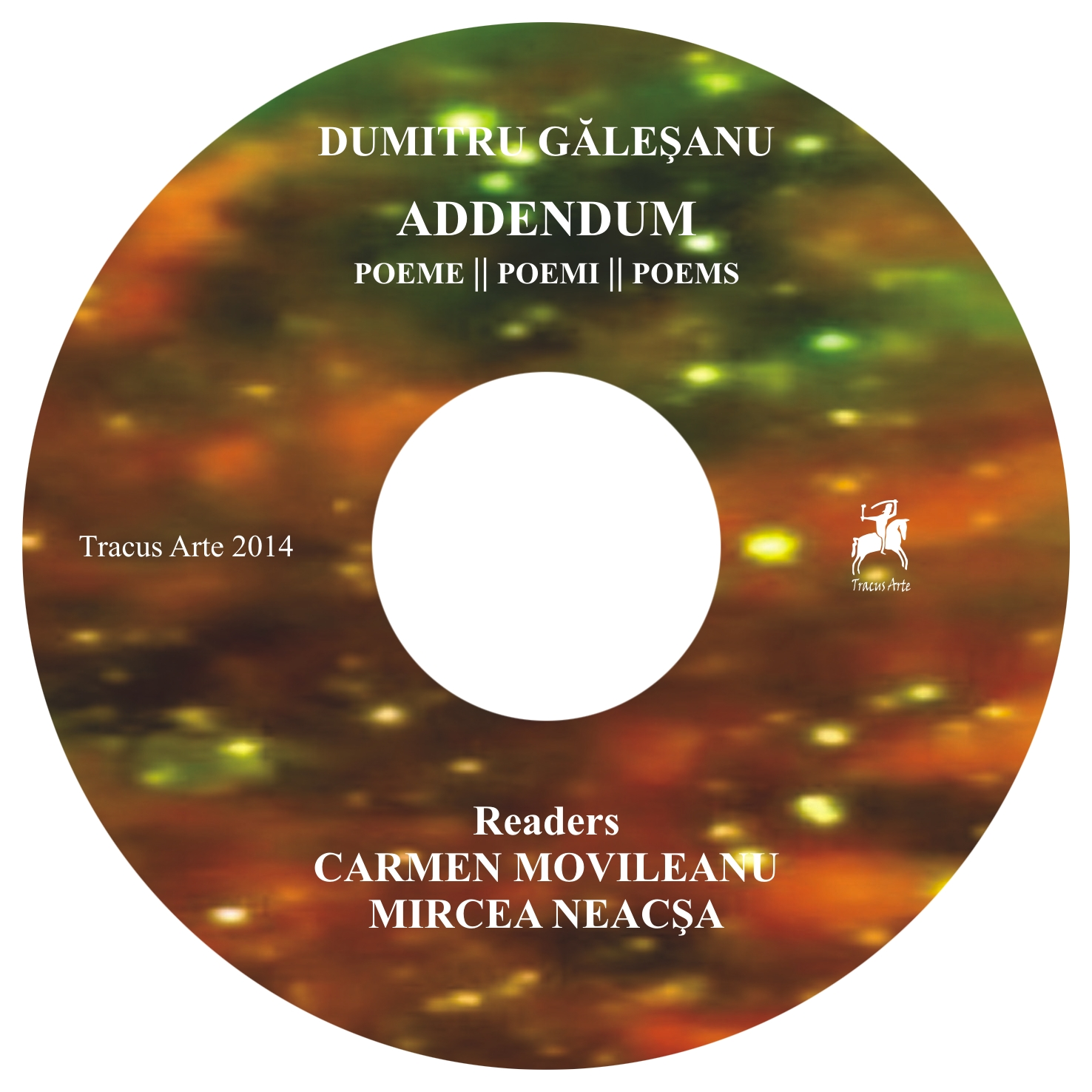
CDs Addéndum (2014)

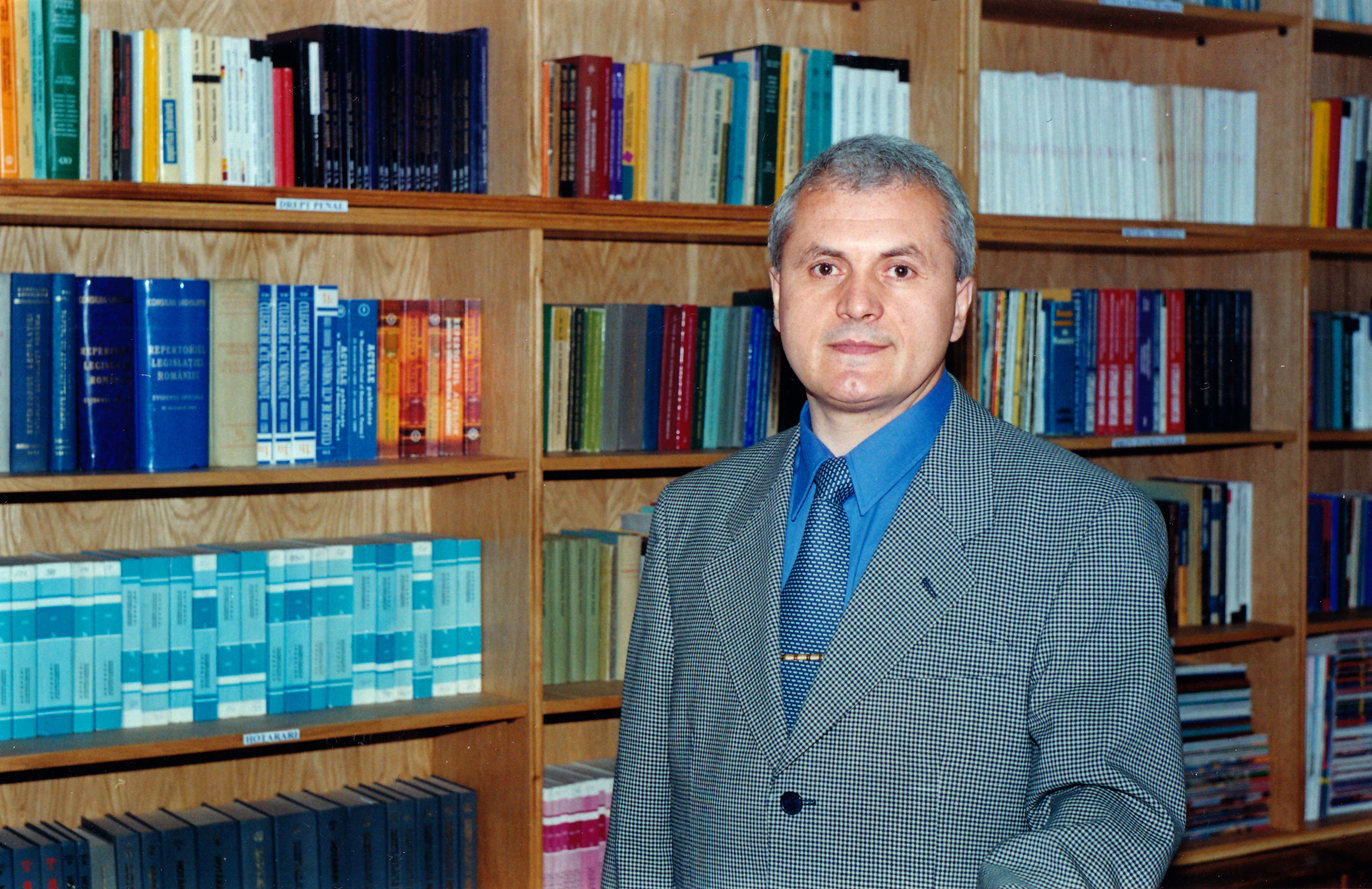
Dumitru Găleșanu at Râmnicu Vâlcea in the 2000s.
