= Jean-Pierre Le Lain =

French rower

Personal information
- Nationality: French
- Born: 23 September 1961 (age 65)

Sport
- Sport: Rowing

Jean-Pierre Le Lain (born 23 September 1961) is a French rower. He competed in the men's coxless four event at the 1992 Summer Olympics.
