= Walton Athletic Club =

British athletics club

- Founded: 1942
- Ground: Waterside Drive Sports Hub Athletics Arena
- Location: Walton-on-Thames, Surrey, England

Walton Athletic Club or Walton AC for short, is a British athletics club based in Surrey. The club is based at Waterside Drive Sports Hub Athletics Arena, adjacent to the Elmbridge Xcel Leisure Complex.

== History ==
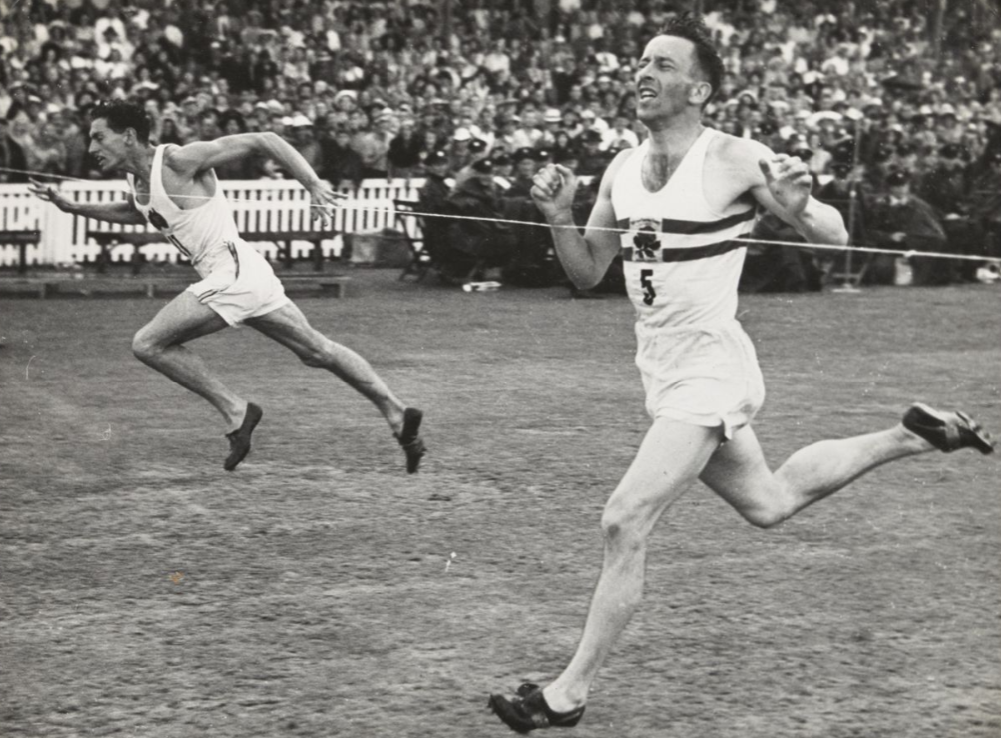
1950 Empire Games 440 yards final, Leslie Lewis (right)

The club was formed in 1942 and by 1944 had a membership of 72. The club competed at the Stompond Lane Sports Ground.

The club grew a reputation of producing successful runners and was a leading club in the country at the time. Les Lewis won silver at the 1950 British Empire Games in Auckland, New Zealand and Chris Chataway won gold four years later at 1954 British Empire and Commonwealth Games held in Vancouver, Canada.

During 1986 the club launched an appeal for funds to install a £300,000 all-weather track at Stompond Lane but the plans dragged on for several years before finally coming to fruition in July 1989.

In 1995 the club signed a 25-year lease with Elmbridge Council to remain at the stadium but on 19 September 2017, Stompond Lane was used for the last time to host Walton & Hersham F.C.. After this game, the existing structures were demolished to make way for a development of 54 new houses, and the athletic and football teams relocated to the new Elmbridge Sports Hub in Waterside Drive.

== Notable athletes ==
=== Olympic athletes ===
Athlete	Event/s	Games	Medals/Ref
Les Lewis	400m, 4 × 100 m	1948, 1952	
Bill Nankeville	1,500m	1948, 1952	
Chris Chataway	5,000m	1952, 1956	
Ken Wilmshurst	long jump/triple jump	1956	
Jim Hogan	10,000 metres / marathon	1964, 1968	
Salih Hassan	Rowing	1984, 1988, 1982	
Paul Edwards	Shot put	1988, 1992	
