= Luca Sartori =

Italian rower

Personal information
- Nationality: Italian
- Born: 19 July 1971 (age 53); Terracina, Italy

Sport
- Sport: Rowing

Luca Sartori (born 19 July 1971) is an Italian former rower. He competed in the men's coxless four event at the 1992 Summer Olympics.
