= Timm Stade =

German windsurfer

Personal information
- Nationality: German
- Born: 31 March 1968 (age 56); Lindau, West Germany

Sport
- Sport: Windsurfing

Timm Stade (born 31 March 1968) is a German former windsurfer. He competed in the men's Lechner A-390 event at the 1992 Summer Olympics.
