= Piotr Olewiński =

Polish windsurfer

Personal information
- Nationality: Polish
- Born: 16 August 1968 (age 56); Gdańsk, Poland

Sport
- Sport: Windsurfing

Piotr Olewiński (born 16 August 1968) is a Polish windsurfer. He competed in the men's Lechner A-390 event at the 1992 Summer Olympics.
