= Ekaterina Pitirimova =

Russian rower

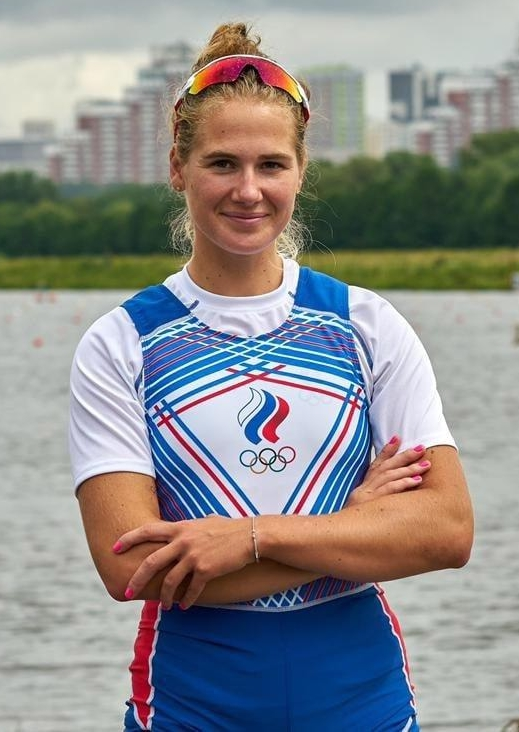

Personal information
- Nationality: Russia
- Born: 5 July 1996 (age 28); Kolomna, Russia

Sport
- Sport: Rowing

Ekaterina Pitirimova (born 5 July 1996) is a Russian rower. She competed in the 2020 Summer Olympics.

Her father, Viktor, was also a rower, representing the Soviet Union at the 1992 Summer Olympics.
