= Luís Caliço =

Portuguese windsurfer (1969–2024

Personal information
- Nationality: Portuguese
- Born: 31 August 1969 Loulé, Algarve, Portugal
- Died: 20 July 2024 (aged 54)

Sport
- Sport: Windsurfing

Luís Caliço (31 August 1969 – 19 July 2024) was a Portuguese windsurfer. He competed in the men's Division II event at the 1988 Summer Olympics.

Caliço died on 19 July 2024, at the age of 54.
