= Thomas Wallner (windsurfer) =

Austrian windsurfer

Personal information
- Nationality: Austrian
- Born: 11 January 1965 (age 60); Gmunden, Austria

Sport
- Sport: Windsurfing

Thomas Wallner (born 11 January 1965) is an Austrian windsurfer. He competed in the Division II event at the 1988 Summer Olympics.
