= Bruno Dumay =

French rower

Personal information
- Nationality: French
- Born: 12 June 1960 (age 64); Saint-Quentin, France

Sport
- Sport: Rowing

Bruno Dumay (born 12 June 1960) is a French rower. He competed in the men's coxless four event at the 1992 Summer Olympics.
