= Ty Brodie =

Antigua and Barbuda windsurfer (born 1966)

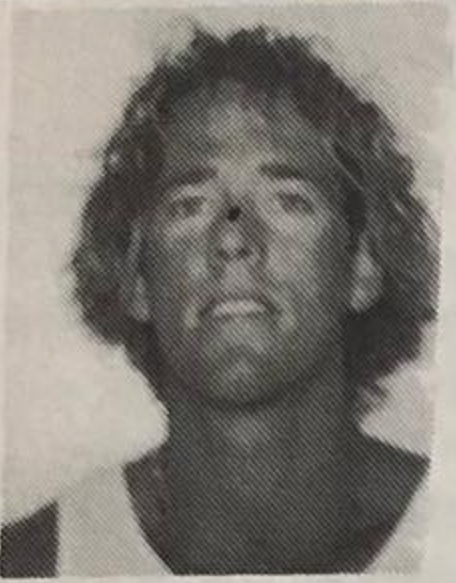

Personal information
- Born: 2 October 1966 (age 58)

Sport
- Country: Antigua and Barbuda
- Sport: Windsurfing

Ty Shannon Brodie (born 2 October 1966) is an Antigua and Barbuda windsurfer. He competed in the men's Lechner A-390 event at the 1992 Summer Olympics.
