= Vadim Yunash =

Soviet rower

Personal information
- Nationality: Soviet
- Born: 29 February 1968 (age 58)

Sport
- Sport: Rowing

Vadim Yunash (born 29 February 1968) is a Soviet rower. He competed in the men's coxless four event at the 1992 Summer Olympics.
