= Salih Hassan =

British rower

Personal information
- Nationality: British
- Born: 26 December 1962 (age 63) London, England

Sport
- Sport: Rowing
- Club: Walton AC

Salih Hassan (born 26 December 1962) is a British rower. He competed at the 1984 Summer Olympics, 1988 Summer Olympics and the 1992 Summer Olympics.
