= Nicolae Spîrcu =

Romanian rower

Personal information
- Nationality: Romanian
- Born: 6 December 1969 (age 56) Tia Mare, Romania

Sport
- Sport: Rowing

Nicolae Spîrcu (born 6 December 1969) is a Romanian rower. He competed at the 1992 Summer Olympics and the 1996 Summer Olympics.
