= Kutlu Torunlar =

Turkish windsurfer

Personal information
- Nationality: Turkish
- Born: 23 August 1968 (age 57); Istanbul, Turkey
- Height: 187 cm (6 ft 2 in)
- Weight: 68 kg (150 lb)

Sport
- Sport: Windsurfing
- Club: Galatasaray SK

Kutlu Torunlar (born 23 August 1968) is a Turkish windsurfer. He competed at the 1992 Summer Olympics and the 1996 Summer Olympics.
