= Lee Han-im =

South Korean windsurfer (born 1969)

Personal information
- Nationality: South Korean
- Born: 20 March 1969 (age 57)
- Height: 166 cm (5 ft 5 in)
- Weight: 63 kg (139 lb)

Sport
- Sport: Windsurfing

Lee Han-im (Korean: 이한임, also known as Lee Han-lim, born 20 March 1969) is a South Korean windsurfer. He competed in the men's Division II event at the 1988 Summer Olympics.
