= Don Telfer =

Canadian rower

Personal information
- Born: 19 May 1961 (age 63); Calgary, Alberta, Canada

Sport
- Sport: Rowing

Don Telfer (born 19 May 1961) is a Canadian rower. He competed at the 1988 Summer Olympics and the 1992 Summer Olympics.
