= Marek Avamere =

Estonian rower (born 1970)

Personal information
- Nationality: Estonian
- Born: 26 January 1970 (age 56) Pärnu, Estonia

Sport
- Sport: Rowing

Marek Avamere (born 26 January 1970) is an Estonian rower. He competed in the men's coxless four event at the 1992 Summer Olympics.
