= In Vichet =

- អ៊ិន វិចិត្រ
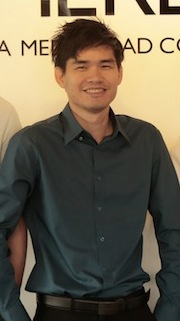
- In Vichet
- Born: 23 August 1983 (age 43); Phnom Penh, Cambodia
- Education: Williams College; University of Michigan
- Occupations: Co-founder and CEO of Groupin, Mediaload and Little Fashion

In Vichet (Khmer: អ៊ិន វិចិត្រ; born 23 August 1983), is the co-founder and CEO of one of Cambodia’s first and most successful forays into e-commerce. He and his three other siblings founded Little Fashion in December 2010. He is also co-founder of Khmerload, also known as Mediaload, the first Cambodian tech startup to receive investment from Silicon Valley investors. It secured seed funding of $200,000 from 500 Startups in 2017. Channel NewsAsia featured Vichet as one of the great disruptors in Cambodia.

== Early life and education ==
Vichet graduated from National University of Management with a Bachelor's degree in Business Administration and Management in 2003 and from Institute of Foreign Languages, Royal University of Phnom Penh with a Bachelor of Arts degree in Education in 2004. He earned a Master of Arts in Development Economics from Williams College in 2007 and Ph.D candidacy in Economics from University of Michigan in 2011.

== Career ==
While in the U.S., where Vichet had lived on and off for five years as a student, he dabbled in various online business ideas, including an e-commerce project to buy-sell course books, in his spare time. Together with his two brothers he began the website in 2011 while at the University of Michigan. When it began to show potential, he returned home full-time to develop Mediaload.

In 2016, he struggled to raise seed funding from regional investors as there was no Cambodian successful startup story before. He managed to secure funding from 500 Startups in 2017 only after he launched Mediaload in Myanmar successfully.

In September 2020, Mediaload secured an undisclosed amount of Series A funding from True Group, the telecom arm of Thai conglomerate Charoen Pokphand Group.
