= Jaap Krijtenburg =

Dutch rower (born 1969)

Medal record

Men's rowing

Representing the Netherlands

World Rowing Championships
Silver medal – second place	1990 Tasmania	M4-
Silver medal – second place	1994 Indianapolis	M8+
Silver medal – second place	1995 Tampere	M8+

Jaap Krijtenburg (born 16 May 1969 in Eindhoven) is a Dutch rower.
