= Markus Vogt =

German rower (born 1965)

Medal record

Men's rowing

Representing Germany

World Rowing Championships
Bronze medal – third place	1991 Vienna	M4-

Markus Vogt (born 25 September 1965, in Munich) is a German rower. He finished 4th in the coxless four at the 1992 Summer Olympics.
