= Armin Weyrauch =

German rower

Personal information
- Born: 22 January 1964 (age 62) Friedberg, Hesse, Germany
Medal record
Men's rowing
Representing West Germany
World Championships
Gold medal – first place	1990 Tasmania	M8+
Summer Universiade
Bronze medal – third place	1989 Duisburg	Eights
Representing Germany
World Championships
Gold medal – first place	1991 Vienna	M4+

Armin Christian Weyrauch (born 22 January 1964) is a German rower. He finished 4th in the men's coxless four event at the 1992 Summer Olympics. He was part of a rowing team that set the world record in 1991.
