= Bucinișu =

- Commune
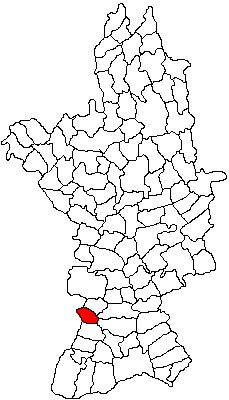
- Location in Olt County

- Location in Romania
- Coordinates: 43°57′N 24°15′E
- Country: Romania
- County: Olt
- Population (2021-12-01): 1,796
- Time zone: EET/EEST (UTC+2/+3)
- Vehicle reg.: OT
- Website: primariabucinisu.ro

Bucinișu (Romanian pronunciation: [butʃiˈniʃu]), composed of two villages, Bucinișu and Bucinișu Mic, is a small commune in Olt County in the region of southern Oltenia, Romania. It has mainly developed throughout the time on the practice of agriculture.

Its name draws its origin from a sound instrument used by the drovers that would tend their flocks of sheep in that region, an instrument called "bucium" or "bucin".
