= Aldo Suurväli =

Estonian swimmer

Personal information
- Born: 17 May 1967 (age 59) Tallinn, then part of Estonian SSR, Soviet Union

Sport
- Sport: Swimming

Aldo Suurväli (born 17 May 1967) is an Estonian butterfly swimmer. He competed in two events at the 1992 Summer Olympics.
