= Pat Peoples =

New Zealand rower (born 1969)

Personal information
- Birth name: Patrick Edward Peoples
- Nationality: New Zealand
- Born: 21 February 1969 (age 56); Greymouth, New Zealand
- Height: 190 cm (6 ft 3 in)

Patrick Edward Peoples (born 21 February 1969) is a New Zealand rower.

Peoples was born in 1969 in Greymouth, New Zealand. He represented New Zealand at the 1992 Summer Olympics. He is listed as New Zealand Olympian athlete number 658 by the New Zealand Olympic Committee.

Peoples has a civil engineering degree from the University of Canterbury. He worked for Fulton Hogan, first in Christchurch and then in the Waikato. He is self-employed and owns Schick Group of Companies that includes Schick Civil Construction and has built up an organisation with over 400 staff.
