= Krista Kruuv =

Estonian sailor

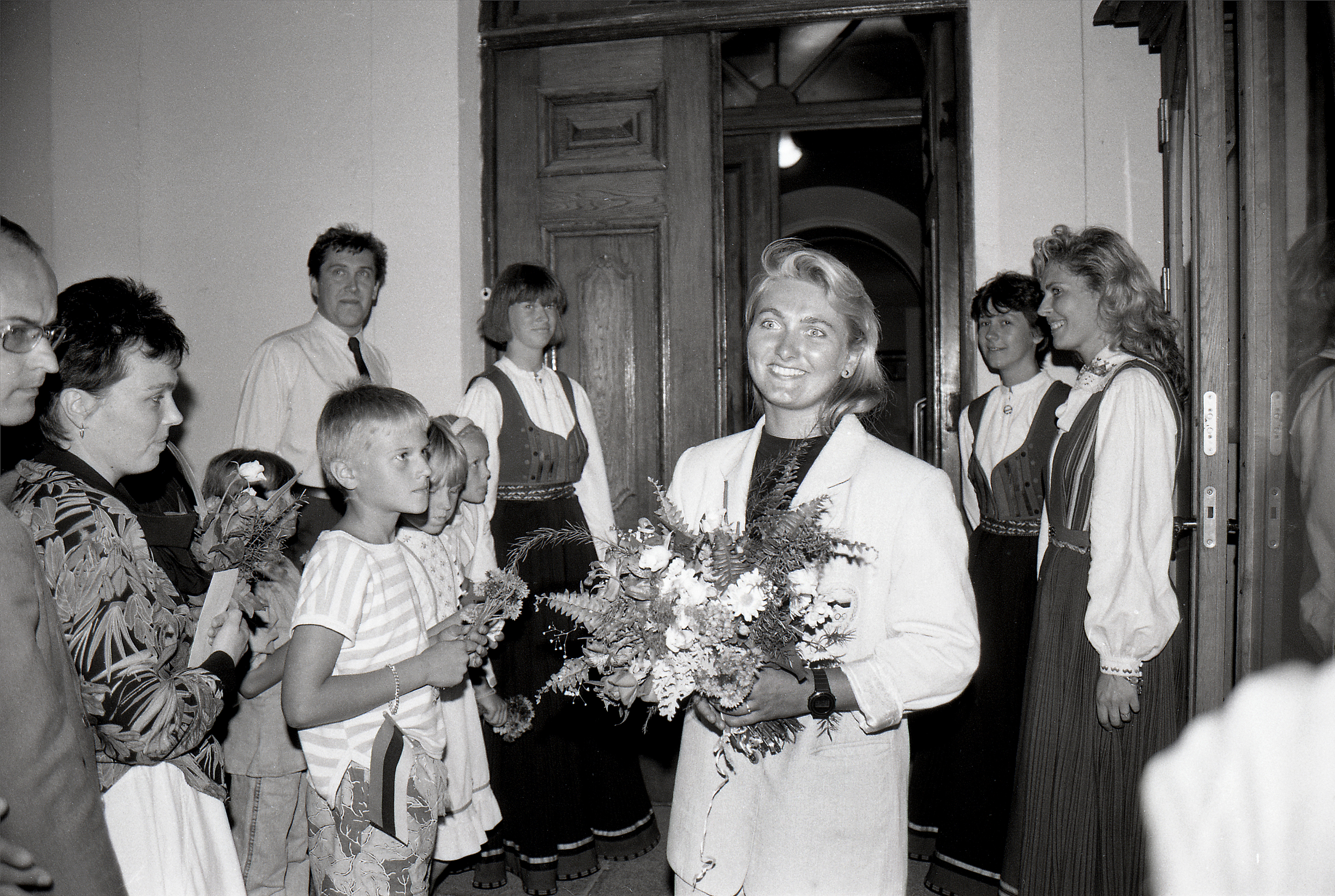
- Kruuv in 1992

Personal information
- Nationality: Estonian
- Born: 8 June 1971 (age 54) Tartu, then part of Estonian SSR, Soviet Union

Sport
- Sport: Sailing

Krista Kruuv (born 8 June 1971) is an Estonian sailor. She competed in the 1992 Summer Olympics and the 1996 Summer Olympics.
