= Stojan Vidakovič =

Slovenian windsurfer

Personal information
- Nationality: Slovenian
- Born: 30 November 1967 (age 57); Maribor, Yugoslavia

Sport
- Sport: Windsurfing

Stojan Vidakovič (born 30 November 1967) is a Slovenian windsurfer. He competed in the men's Lechner A-390 event at the 1992 Summer Olympics.
