= Roby La Mura =

Italian rower

Personal information
- Full name: Carmine Robert La Mura
- Nationality: Italian
- Born: 11 October 1968 (age 57) Pompei, Italy

Sport
- Sport: Rowing

Carmine Robert "Roby" La Mura (born 11 October 1968) is an Italian rower who competed in the 1992 Summer Olympics and the 1996 Summer Olympics.
