= Fernando Molina (rower) =

Spanish rower

Fernando Molina Castillo
Personal information
- Born: 25 April 1965 (age 61) Seville

Sport
- Sport: Rowing
Medal record
Men's rowing
Representing Spain
World Rowing Championships
Gold medal – first place	1984 Montreal	Lwt men's four
Gold medal – first place	1993 Račice	Lwt men's pair
Bronze medal – third place	1985 Hazewinkel	Lwt men's eight
Bronze medal – third place	1986 Nottingham	Lwt men's four
Bronze medal – third place	1991 Vienna	Lwt men's four

Fernando Molina Castillo (born 25 April 1965) is a Spanish lightweight rower. He won a gold medal at the 1984 World Rowing Championships in Montreal with the lightweight men's four.
