= Gavin Stewart =

British rower

Personal information
- Nationality: British
- Born: 27 April 1957 (age 67); Belfast, Northern Ireland

Sport
- Sport: Rowing

Gavin Stewart (born 27 April 1957) is a British financial services executive and former rower. He competed at the 1988 Summer Olympics and the 1992 Summer Olympics.

== Early life ==
He lived in Molesey, and trained with Molesey Boat Club.

== Career ==
He spent 27 years in financial regulation for the Bank of England, Financial Services Authority and Financial Conduct Authority, before joining Grant Thornton in 2016. Stewart is also an author and his first novel Walk the Line was published in 2018.
