= Vjatšeslav Divonin =

Estonian rower

Personal information
- Nationality: Estonian
- Born: 8 May 1970 (age 55) Narva, then part of Estonian SSR, Soviet Union

Sport
- Sport: Rowing

Vjatšeslav Divonin (born 8 May 1970) is an Estonian rower. He competed in the men's coxless four event at the 1992 Summer Olympics.
