= Kaijo Kuusing =

Estonian windsurfer

Personal information
- Nationality: Estonian
- Born: 15 June 1968 (age 57) Viljandi, then part of Estonian SSR, Soviet Union
- Height: 188 cm (6 ft 2 in)
- Weight: 75 kg (165 lb)

Sport
- Sport: Windsurfing

Kaijo Kuusing (born 15 June 1968) is an Estonian windsurfer. He competed in the men's Lechner A-390 event at the 1992 Summer Olympics.
