= Toomas Vilpart =

Estonian rower

Personal information
- Nationality: Estonian
- Born: 21 September 1971 (age 55) Viljandi, then part of Estonian SSR, Soviet Union

Sport
- Sport: Rowing

Toomas Vilpart (born 21 September 1971) is an Estonian rower. He competed in the men's coxless four event at the 1992 Summer Olympics.
