= Dominique Lecointe =

French rower

Personal information
- Nationality: French
- Born: 22 March 1957 (age 67); Boulogne-sur-Mer, France

Sport
- Sport: Rowing

Dominique Lecointe (born 22 March 1957) is a French rower. He competed at the 1980, 1984, 1988 and the 1992 Summer Olympics.
