= Roland Milošević =

Venezuelan windsurfer (born 1969)

Personal information
- Nationality: Venezuelan
- Born: 26 January 1969 (age 56)

Sport
- Sport: Windsurfing

Roland Milošević (born 26 January 1969) is a Venezuelan windsurfer. He competed at the 1988 Summer Olympics, representing Yugoslavia, and the 1996 Summer Olympics, representing Venezuela.
