= Patrick Manning (rower) =

American rower

Personal information
- Born: May 6, 1967 (age 59) Poughkeepsie, New York, U.S.
- Education: FDR High School; Northeastern University
Medal record
Men's rowing
Representing United States
Olympic Games
Silver medal – second place	1992 Barcelona	Coxless fours
World Rowing Championships
Silver medal – second place	1991 Vienna	Coxless fours

Patrick Francis "Pat" Manning, Jr. (born May 6, 1967) was a five-time member of the U.S. National Rowing Team. He competed in the 1992 Olympics in Barcelona in the men's heavyweight coxless four and won a silver medal.

He attended and was a member of the rowing team at Franklin Delano Roosevelt High School in Hyde Park, New York, graduating in 1985. He is a 1990 summa cum laude graduate of Northeastern University and was elected to the school's Hall of Fame in 2000. He graduated from the Harvard Business School in 1994 and is currently a partner at Bain & Company in London.

Published in Forbes Patrick talks about how 8% of Olympic rowers wound up landing top jobs at public companies, investment banks, and law and consulting firms, or starting their own companies.
