= Jean-Paul Fleri Soler =

Maltese sailor

Personal information
- Nationality: Malta
- Born: 6 June 1964 (age 60); Malta
- Height: 1.70 m (5 ft 7 in)
- Weight: 65 kg (143 lb)

Sport
- Sport: Windsurfing

Jean-Paul Fleri Soler (born 5 June 1964) is a Maltese windsurfer. He competed in the 1988 Summer Olympics and the 1992 Summer Olympics.
