= Patrick Vibert-Vichet =

French rower

Personal information
- Nationality: French
- Born: 3 February 1959 (age 66); Aime, France

Sport
- Sport: Rowing

Patrick Vibert-Vichet (born 3 February 1959) is a French rower. He competed at the 1984 Summer Olympics and the 1992 Summer Olympics.
