= Mohamed Al-Kaabi (windsurfer) =

Qatari sailor

Personal information
- Nationality: Qatar
- Born: 11 November 1957 (age 67)
- Height: 1.70 m (5 ft 7 in)
- Weight: 64 kg (141 lb)

Sport
- Sport: Windsurfing

Mohamed Al-Kaabi (born 11 November 1957) is a Qatari windsurfer. He competed in the 1988 Summer Olympics.
