= Jani Klemenčič =

Slovenian rower

Personal information
- Born: 21 September 1971 (age 54) Jesenice, SFR Yugoslavia
Medal record
Men's rowing
Representing Slovenia
Olympic Games
| Bronze medal – third place | 1992 Barcelona | Coxless four |
World Rowing Championships
| Bronze medal – third place | 2001 Lucerne | Coxless four |

Janez "Jani" Klemenčič (born 21 September 1971) is a former Slovenian rower and Olympic medallist at the 1992 Summer Olympics. He competed in four consecutive Summer Olympics for his native country.
