= Tarmo Virkus =

Estonian rower

Personal information
- Nationality: Estonian
- Born: 28 January 1971 (age 55) Pärnu, then part of Estonian SSR, Soviet Union

Sport
- Sport: Rowing

Tarmo Virkus (born 28 January 1971) is an Estonian rower.

He competed in the men's coxless four event at the 1992 Summer Olympics. He also competed in the Men's Pair event at the 1993 World Rowing Championships in Roudnice nad Labem, Czech Republic.
