= Milan Janša =

Slovenian rower

Personal information
- Born: 26 September 1965 (age 60) Jesenice, Yugoslavia
Medal record
Men's rowing
Olympic Games
Representing Slovenia
Bronze medal – third place	1992 Barcelona	Coxless four
World Rowing Championships
Representing Yugoslavia
Bronze medal – third place	Bled 1989	Coxed pair
Bronze medal – third place	Tasmania 1990	Coxed pair
Representing Slovenia
Bronze medal – third place	2001 Lucerne	Coxless four
Summer Universiade
Representing Yugoslavia
Bronze medal – third place	1987 Zagreb	Eight
Mediterranean Games
Representing Slovenia
Bronze medal – third place	1997 Bari	Coxless four

Milan Janša (born 26 September 1965) is a former Slovenian rower and Olympic medallist at the 1992 Summer Olympics. He competed in four consecutive Summer Olympics, starting in 1988 for Yugoslavia.
