= Magnus Torell =

Swedish windsurfer

Personal information
- Nationality: Swedish
- Born: 1 August 1964 (age 60); Gothenburg, Sweden

Sport
- Sport: Windsurfing

Magnus Torell (born 1 August 1964) is a Swedish windsurfer. He competed at the 1988 Summer Olympics and the 1992 Summer Olympics.
