= Iztok Čop =

Slovenian rower

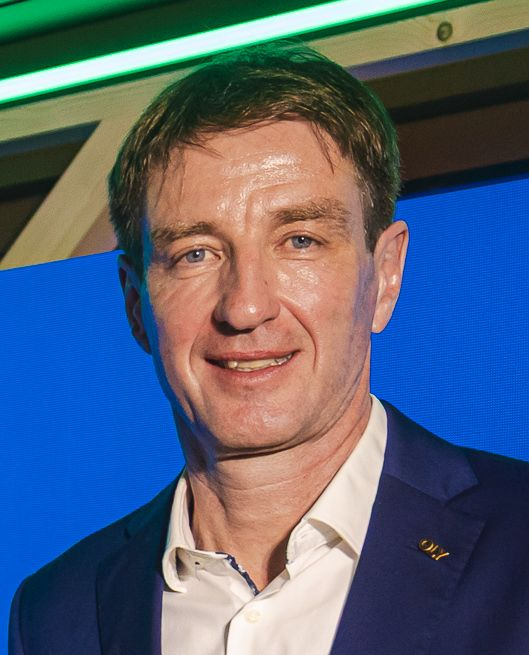
- Čop in 2026

Medal record

Men's rowing

Representing Yugoslavia

World Championships
Silver medal – second place	1991 Vienna	Coxless pair

Representing Slovenia

Olympic Games
Gold medal – first place	2000 Sydney	Double sculls
Silver medal – second place	2004 Athens	Double sculls
Bronze medal – third place	1992 Barcelona	Coxless pair
Bronze medal – third place	2012 London	Double sculls

World Championships
Gold medal – first place	1995 Tampere	Single sculls
Gold medal – first place	1999 St. Catharines	Double sculls
Gold medal – first place	2005 Gifu	Double sculls
Gold medal – first place	2007 Munich	Double sculls
Silver medal – second place	2001 Lucerne	Single sculls
Silver medal – second place	2002 Seville	Single sculls
Silver medal – second place	2005 Gifu	Quadruple sculls
Silver medal – second place	2006 Eton	Double sculls
Bronze medal – third place	1993 Račice	Coxless Pair
Bronze medal – third place	1994 Indianapolis	Single sculls
Bronze medal – third place	2003 Milan	Single sculls

Gold Cup Challenge
Gold medal – first place	2011 Philadelphia	Single sculls

Iztok Čop OLY (born 17 June 1972) is a Slovenian rower and Olympic gold medalist.

== Biography ==
Čop was born in Kranj, SR Slovenia, and started rowing at the age of 13 in Bled, where Slovenia's best rowing club is located.

Originally rowing in the coxless pairs, Čop finished second in the World Championships in 1991, and won Bronze at the Barcelona Olympics in 1992 with Denis Žvegelj (the first Olympic medal for independent Slovenia). He then switched to the single scull, winning gold at the 1995 World Championship, but came fourth at the Atlanta Olympics in 1996. He then changed to the men's double sculls with Luka Špik, and won the 1999 World Championships, and gold at the Sydney Olympics in 2000, which was the first Olympic gold medal for Slovenia since its independence.

Špik and Čop were the favourites to repeat the victory in men's double sculls at the 2004 Summer Olympics, but finished in the silver medal position.

Špik and Čop came into the 2012 Summer Olympics not as favorites; however, with a strong performance in the semifinals they became contenders for a medal. After taking an early lead and holding it until nearly the 1500 m mark, they lost the lead to the Italians and the later winners from New Zealand. They finished in third position, giving Slovenia its second medal of the Olympics after Urška Žolnir won the gold 2 days earlier.

In 2008 Čop became the fourth Slovenian to compete at five Olympics, after shooter Rajmond Debevec (eight Olympics) in 2000, biathlete/cross country skier Sašo Grajf in 2002, and biathlete Janez Ožbolt in 2006.

Čop lives in Radovljica with his wife Petra and daughters Ruby and Amber.

== Achievements ==
Olympic Games

- 1992: Barcelona (ESP) – 3rd place (coxless pair with Denis Žvegelj)
- 1996: Atlanta (USA) – 4th place (single scull)
- 2000: Sydney (AUS) – 1st place (double scull with Luka Špik)
- 2004: Athens (GRE) – 2nd place (double scull with Luka Špik)
- 2008: Beijing (CHI) – 6th place (double scull with Luka Špik)
- 2012: London (GBR) – 3rd place (double scull with Luka Špik)

Junior World Championships:

- 1989: Szeged (HUN) – 1st place (coxless pair)
- 1990: Aiguebelette (FRA) – 1st place (coxless pair)

World Championships:

- 1990: Lake Barrington (AUS) – 7th place (coxless four)
- 1991: Vienna (AUT) – 2nd place (coxless pair)
- 1993: Roudnice (CZE) – 3rd place (coxless pair)
- 1994: Indianapolis (USA) – 3rd place (single scull)
- 1995: Tampere (FIN) – 1st place (single scull)
- 1997: Aiguebelette (FRA) – 4th place (single scull)
- 1998: Cologne (GER) – 4th place (single scull)
- 1999: St. Catharines (CAN) – 1st place (double scull)
- 2001: Lucerne (SUI) – 2nd place (single scull)
- 2002: Seville (ESP) – 2nd place (single scull)
- 2003: Milan (ITA) – 3rd place (single scull)
- 2005: Gifu (JPN) – 1st place (double scull), 2nd place (quadruple scull)
- 2006: Eton (GBR) – 2nd place (double scull)
- 2007: Munich (GER) – 1st place (double scull)

== See also ==
- List of athletes with the most appearances at Olympic Games

Olympic Games
Preceded by Brigita Bukovec	Flagbearer for Slovenia; Sydney 2000	Succeeded by Beno Lapajne
Awards and achievements
Preceded by Drew Ginn	Thomas Keller Medal; 2015	Succeeded by Caroline and Georgina Evers-Swindell
