= Tia Mare =

- Commune
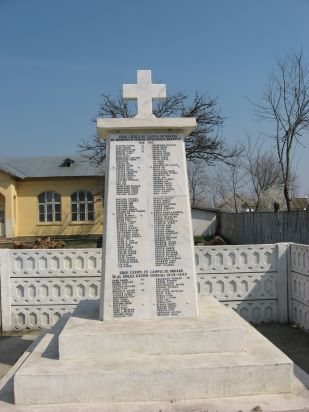
- War heroes' monument in Potlogeni

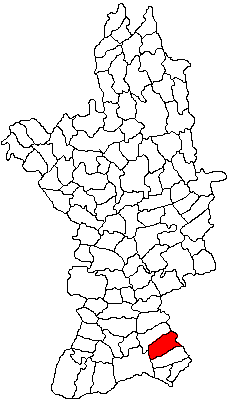
- Location in Olt County

- Location in Romania
- Coordinates: 43°51′40″N 24°38′13″E
- Country: Romania
- County: Olt
- Area: 58.06 km^{2} (22.42 sq mi)
- Population (2021-12-01): 3,870
  - Density: 66.7/km^{2} (173/sq mi)
- Time zone: UTC+02:00 (EET)
  - Summer (DST): UTC+03:00 (EEST)
- Vehicle reg.: OT
- Website: www.primariatiamare.ro

Tia Mare is a commune in Olt County, Oltenia, Romania. It has 4496 inhabitants, nearly all of whom are Romanians and Romanian Orthodox. The commune is composed of three villages: Doanca, Potlogeni and Tia Mare.

== Natives ==
- Dumitru Găleșanu (b. 1955), writer and judge
- Nicolae Spîrcu (b. 1969), rower
