= Obârșia =

- Commune
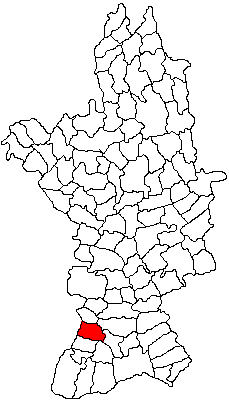
- Location in Olt County

- Location in Romania
- Coordinates: 43°53′N 24°20′E
- Country: Romania
- County: Olt
- Population (2021-12-01): 2,131
- Time zone: EET/EEST (UTC+2/+3)
- Vehicle reg.: OT

Obârșia is a commune in Olt County, Oltenia, Romania. It is composed of five villages: Câmpu Părului, Coteni, Obârșia, Obârșia Nouă and Tabonu.
