= Sadik Mujkič =

Slovenian rower

Personal information
- Born: 29 February 1968 (age 58) Jesenice, Yugoslavia

Sport
- Sport: Rowing
Medal record
Representing Yugoslavia
Olympic Games
Bronze medal – third place	1988 Seoul	Coxless pair
Summer Universiade
Bronze medal – third place	1987 Zagreb	Eight
Representing Slovenia
Olympic Games
Bronze medal – third place	1992 Barcelona	Coxless four
Mediterranean Games
Bronze medal – third place	1997 Bari	Coxless four

Sadik Mujkič (born 29 February 1968) is a retired Slovenian rower and Olympic medallist at the 1988 and the 1992 Summer Olympics.
