= Sašo Mirjanič =

Slovenian rower

Personal information
- Born: 27 January 1968 Koper, Yugoslavia
- Died: 25 September 1994 (aged 26) Žirovnica, Sevnica, Yugoslavia

Sport
- Sport: Rowing
Medal record
Representing Slovenia
Olympic Games
Bronze medal – third place	1992 Barcelona	Coxless fours
Representing Yugoslavia
Summer Universiade
Bronze medal – third place	1987 Zagreb	Eight

Sašo Mirjanič (27 January 1968 – 25 September 1994) was a Slovenian rower and Olympic medallist at the 1992 Summer Olympics.
