= Division II (windsurf board) =

Lechner Division II
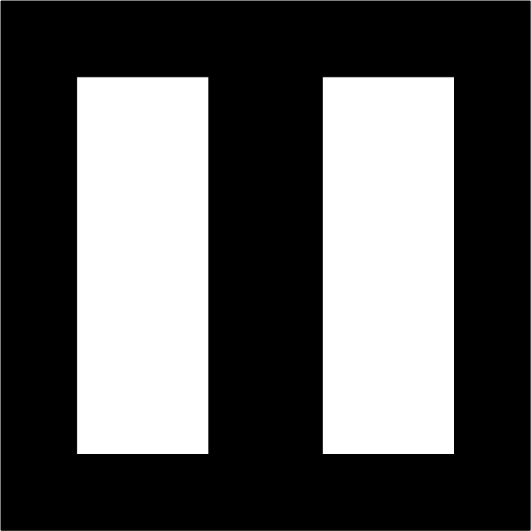
- Class symbol

Development
- Designer: George Lechner
- Design: One Design
- Name: Lechner Division II

Boat
- Crew: 1

Hull
- Type: Sailboard
- LOA: 3.9 m (13 ft)

Sails
- Mainsail area: 6.7 m^{2} (72 sq ft)

The 1988 Olympics, saw the introduction of Lechner Division II boards. The Division II class used a 6.5 m sail and were round bottomed boards designed for upwind sailing in light to moderate winds.

Although they were difficult to sail downwind and a technical board to sail upwind, they are still the fastest 370 cm (12 ft) board upwind in up to 8 kn (4 m/s) of breeze. The contest for the Olympic board had been between the Davidson (a Swedish design) and the Lechner built in Austria. The final Olympic rig was available less than a year before the Olympics.

Year	Gold	Silver	Bronze
1988 Seoul	New Zealand (NZL); Bruce Kendall	Netherlands Antilles (AHO); Jan Boersma	United States (USA); Mike Gebhardt

Like in 1984, the supplied equipment was rotated daily (except for the rigs).
