= List of World Championships medalists in sailing (windsurfer classes) =

This is a List of World Championships medalists in sailing in sailboard classes.

== World Sailing Event - IYRU Women's Sailing World Championships ==
IYRU Women's Sailing World Championships

== Lechner A390 ==
=== Men's ===
Year	Gold	Silver	Bronze
1989 Puerto Pollenca	Eric Belot (FRA)	Alain Cadre (FRA)	Claude Muzellec (FRA)
1990 Corpus Christi	Michel Quentin (FRA)	Jorge García Velazco (ARG)	Eric Belot (FRA)
1991 San Francisco	Barry Edington (GBR)	Michel Quentin (FRA)	Franck David (FRA)
1992 Cadix	Franck David (FRA)	Amit Inbar (ISR)	Claude Muzellec (FRA)

=== Women's ===
Year	Gold	Silver	Bronze
1989 Puerto Pollenca	Jorunn Horgen (NOR)	Penny Way (GBR)	Françoise Grasset (FRA)
1990 Corpus Christi	Penny Way (GBR)	Wendy Thomson (USA)	Lanee Butler (USA)
1991 San Francisco	Maud Herbert (FRA)	Anne Herbert (FRA)	Nathalie Lelièvre (FRA)
1992 Cadix	Maud Herbert (FRA)	Nathalie Lelièvre (FRA)	Dorien de Vries (NED)

== Mistral ==
=== Men's ===
Year	Gold	Silver	Bronze
1986	Julian Anderson (GBR); Nils Hangard (NOR)		
1987	Francesco Wirz (ITA); Chris Lawrence (AUS)	Thomas Foyen (NOR); D. Woods (AUS)	H. Nissen-Lie (NOR); M. Pedersen (AUS)
1988	L. de Pedrini (ITA); H. Piegelin (FRA)	Francesco Wirz (ITA); M. Quintin (FRA)	Claude Muzellec (FRA); Robert Nagy (FRA)
1989 Corpus Christi	Julian Anderson (GBR); Chris Lawrence (AUS)	Riccardo Giordano (ITA); Nikolaos Kaklamanakis (GRE)	H. Mann (SWE); J. Callahan (USA)
1990	J. Hutchcroft (GBR); Chris Lawrence (AUS)	A. Dale (RSA); Ted Huang (USA)	J. Blinnikka (FIN); H. Plumb (GBR)
1991 San Francisco	Julian Anderson (GBR); Riccardo Giordano (ITA); Mike Gebhardt (USA)	A. Morell (ISV); Wim Opten (NED); S. Borncroft (GBR)	H. Mann (SWE); Tim Ratzlaff (USA); K. Schumacher (USA)
1992 Mondello	Riccardo Giordano (ITA); P. van Schie (NED)	T. Lentall (AUS); Aaron McIntosh (NZL)	A. Dale (RSA); Nikolaos Kaklamanakis (GRE)
1993 Kashiwazaki	Bruce Kendall (NZL)	Aaron McIntosh (NZL)	Mike Gebhardt (USA)
1994 Gimli	Aaron McIntosh (NZL)	Bruce Kendall (NZL)	Andrea Zinali (ITA)
1995 Port Elizabeth	João Rodrigues (POR)	Nikolaos Kaklamanakis (GRE)	Aaron McIntosh (NZL)
1996 Haifa	Nikolaos Kaklamanakis (GRE)	Gal Fridman (ISR)	Eduardo García (ARG)
1997 Fremantle	Aaron McIntosh (NZL)	Amit Inbar (ISR)	Marcos Galván (ARG)
1998 Brest	Aaron McIntosh (NZL)	Amit Inbar (ISR)	João Rodrigues (POR)
1999 Nouméa	Lars Kleppich (AUS)	Tony Philp (FIJ)	Marcos Galván (ARG)
2000 Mar del Plata	Nikolaos Kaklamanakis (GRE)	Aaron McIntosh (NZL)	Carlos Espinola (ARG)
2001 Varkiza	Nikolaos Kaklamanakis (GRE)	Przemysław Miarczyński (POL)	Fabrice Hassen (FRA)
2002 Pattaya	Gal Fridman (ISR)	Ricardo Santos (BRA)	Julien Bontemps (FRA)
2003 Cádiz	Przemysław Miarczyński (POL)	Nikolaos Kaklamanakis (GRE)	Gal Fridman (ISR)
2004 Cezme	Julien Bontemps (FRA)	Przemysław Miarczyński (POL)	Nicolas Huguet (FRA)
2005 Palermo	Nicolas Huguet (FRA)	Ricardo Santos (BRA)	Andreas Cariolou (CYP)
2006 Shenzhen	Cheng Kwok Fai (HKG)	Chan King Yin (HKG)	Wu Shifu (CHN)

=== Women's ===
Year	Gold	Silver	Bronze
1986	Melanie Braund (AUS)		
1987	Melanie Braund (AUS)	Jessica Crisp (AUS)	Barbara Kendall (NZL)
1988	V. Capart (FRA)	Anne François (FRA)	Gignoux (FRA)
1991 San Francisco	Jayne Fenner (USA)	S. Rondelez (BEL)	E. Giolai (ITA)
1993 Kashiwazaki	Lee Lai-shan (HKG)	Lanee Butler (USA)	Maud Herbert (FRA)
1994 Gimli	Maud Herbert (FRA)	Li Ke (CHN)	Natasha Sturges (AUS)
1995 Port Elizabeth	Maud Herbert (FRA)	Anne François (FRA)	Lee Lai-Shan (HKG)
1996 Haifa	Maud Herbert (FRA)	Lee Lai-Shan (HKG)	Jayne Fenner-Benedict (USA)
1997 Fremantle	Lee Lai-Shan (HKG)	Alessandra Sensini (ITA)	Barbara Kendall (NZL)
1998 Brest	Barbara Kendall (NZL)	Lee Lai-Shan (HKG)	Faustine Merret (FRA)
1999 Nouméa	Barbara Kendall (NZL)	Faustine Merret (FRA)	Lise Vidal (FRA)
2000 Mar del Plata	Alessandra Sensini (ITA)	Lee Lai-Shan (HKG)	Faustine Merret (FRA)
2001 Varkiza	Lee Lai-Shan (HKG)	Faustine Merret (FRA)	Jeanne Mailhos (FRA)
2002 Pattaya	Barbara Kendall (NZL)	Alessandra Sensini (ITA)	Faustine Merret (FRA)
2003 Cadiz	Lee Korzits (ISR)	Barbara Kendall (NZL)	Faustine Merret (FRA)
2004 Cezme	Alessandra Sensini (ITA)	Barbara Kendall (NZL)	Faustine Merret (FRA)
2005 Palermo	Blanca Manchón (ESP)	Amelie Lux (GER)	Flavia Tartaglini (ITA)
2006 Shenzhen	Wang Shuijia (CHN)	Zhu Huali (CHN)	Qin Zhenmei (CHN)

== RS:X ==
=== Men ===
Year	Gold	Silver	Bronze
2006 Torbole	Casper Bouman (NED)	Tom Ashley (AUS)	Przemysław Miarczyński (POL)
2007 Cascais	Ricardo Santos (BRA)	Przemysław Miarczyński (POL)	Nick Dempsey (GBR)
2008 Auckland	Tom Ashley (NZL)	João Rodrigues (POR)	Shahar Tzuberi (ISR)
2009 Weymouth	Nick Dempsey (GBR)	Nimrod Mashiah (ISR)	Dorian van Rijsselberge (NED)
2010 Kerteminde	Piotr Myszka (POL)	Przemysław Miarczyński (POL)	Nimrod Mashiah (ISR)
2011 Perth	Dorian van Rijsselberghe (NED)	Piotr Myszka (POL)	Nimrod Mashiah (ISR)
2012 Cádiz	Julien Bontemps (FRA)	Nick Dempsey (GBR)	Jon-Paul Tobin (NZL)
2013 Buzios	Nick Dempsey (GBR)	Dorian van Rijsselberghe (NED)	Byron Kokkalanis (GRE)
2014 Santander	Julien Bontemps (FRA)	Przemysław Miarczyński (POL)	Thomas Goyard (FRA)
2015 Al-Mussanah	Pierre Le Coq (FRA)	Wang Aichen (CHN)	Dorian van Rijsselberghe (NED)
2016 Eilat	Piotr Myszka (POL)	Dorian van Rijsselberghe (NED)	Kiran Badloe (NED)
2017 Enoshima	Bing Ye (CHN)	Mateo Sanz Lanz (SUI)	Mengfan Gao (CHN)
2018 Aarhus	Dorian van Rijsselberghe (NED)	Kiran Badloe (NED)	Louis Giard (FRA)
2019 Torbole	Kiran Badloe (NED)	Dorian van Rijsselberghe (NED)	Pierre Le Coq (FRA)
2020 Sorrento	Kiran Badloe (NED)	Dorian van Rijsselberghe (NED)	Thomas Goyard (FRA)
2021 Cáadiz	Kiran Badloe (NED)	Mattia Camboni (ITA)	Byron Kokkalanis (GRE)

=== Women ===
Year	Gold	Silver	Bronze	Ref,
2006 Torbole	Alessandra Sensini (ITA)	Marina Alabau (ESP)	Faustine Merret (FRA)	
2007 Cascais	Zofia Klepacka (POL)	Barbara Kendall (NZL)	Jessica Crisp (AUS)	
2008 Auckland	Alessandra Sensini (ITA)	Barbara Kendall (NZL)	Marina Alabau (ESP)	
2009 Weymouth	Marina Alabau (ESP)	Blanca Manchón (ESP)	Charline Picon (FRA)	
2010 Kerteminde	Blanca Manchón (ESP)	Alessandra Sensini (ITA)	Charline Picon (FRA)	
2011 Perth	Lee Korzits (ISR)	Zofia Klepacka (POL)	Marina Alabau (ESP)	
2012 Cádiz	Lee Korzits (ISR)	Zofia Klepacka (POL)	Alessandra Sensini (ITA)	
2013 Buzios	Lee Korzits (ISR)	Bryony Shaw (GBR)	Maayan Davidovich (ISR)	
2014 Santander	Charline Picon (FRA)	Marina Alabau (ESP)	Maayan Davidovich (ISR)	
2015 Al-Mussanah	Chen Peina (CHN)	Bryony Shaw (GBR)	Lilian de Geus (NED)	
2016 Eilat	Małgorzata Białecka (POL)	Bryony Shaw (GBR)	Lilian de Geus (NED)	
2017 Enoshima	Chen Peina (CHN)	Jiahui Wu (CHN)	Lu Yunxiu (CHN)	
2018 Aarhus	Lilian de Geus (NED)	Charline Picon (FRA)	Lu Yunxiu (CHN)	
2019 Torbole	Lu Yunxiu (CHN)	Katy Spychakov (ISR)	Lilian de Geus (NED)	
2020 Sorrento	Lilian de Geus (NED)	Charline Picon (FRA)	Noy Drihan (ISR)	
2021 Cáadiz	Lilian de Geus (NED)	Katy Spychakov (ISR)	Charline Picon (FRA)	

=== Youth Male ===
Year	Gold	Silver	Bronze
2007 Sopot (POL)	Christian Freimüller (GER)	Richard Hamilton (GBR)	Pierre Le Coq (FRA)
2008 Pattaya (THA)	Ho Tsun Leung (HKG)	Piotr Myszkowski (POL)	Thiseas Kampas (GRE)
2009 Bodrum (TUR)	Michalis Malekkides (CYP)	Thomas Goyard (FRA)	Manfredi Misuraca (ITA)
2010 Kerteminde (DEN)	Thomas Goyard (FRA)	Michalis Malekkides (CYP)	Paweł Tarnowski (POL)
2011 Cagliari (ITA)	Pawel Tarnowski (POL)	Louis Giard (FRA)	Sam Sills (GBR)
2012 Pengu Island	Pawel Tarnowski (POL)	Kieran Martin (GBR)	Martin Olmeta (FRA)
2013 Civitavecchia (ITA)	Mattia Camboni (ITA)	Mayan Rafic (ISR)	Bautista Saubidet Birkner (ARG)
2014 Clearwater (USA)	Radosław Furmański (POL)	Mattia Camboni (ITA)	Toni Bonet Macias (ESP)
2015 Gdynia (POL)	Yoav Omer (ISR)	Francisco Saubidet (ARG)	Titouan Le Bosq (FRA)
2016 Lymasol (CYP)	Yoav Omer (ISR)	Camille BOUYER (FRA)	Tom REUVENY (ISR)
2017 Torbole (ITA)	Tom Reuveny (ISR)	Luca Di Tomassi (ITA)	Andy Brown (GBR)

=== Youth Female ===
Year	Gold	Silver	Bronze
2007 Sopot (POL)	Moana Delle (GER)	Maja Dziarnowska (POL)	Regina Stadler (GER)
2008 Pattaya (THA)	Laura Linares (ITA)	Hei Man H V Chan (HKG)	Maja Dziarnowska (POL)
2009 Bodrum (TUR)	Izzy Hamilton (GBR)	Leonore Bosch (FRA)	Lo Sin Lam (HKG)
2010 Kerteminde (DEN)	Izzy Hamilton (GBR)	Hanna Zembrzuska (POL)	Hélène Noesmoen (FRA)
2011 Cagliari (ITA)	Agnieszka Bilska (POL)	Kamila Smektala (POL)	Barbara Dmuchowska (POL)
2012 Pengu Island	Naomi Cohen (ISR)	Saskia Sills (GBR)	Jeanne Dantès (FRA)
2013 Civitavecchia (ITA)	Marta Maggetti (ITA)	Hadas Hochster (ISR)	Maëlle Guilbaud (FRA)
2014 Clearwater (USA)	Emma Wilson (GBR)	Berenice Mege (FRA)	Marta Maggetti (ITA)
2015 Gdynia (POL)	Noy Drihan (ISR)	Stefania Elfutina (RUS)	Berenice Mege (FRA)
2016 Lymasol (CYP)	Katy Spychakov (ISR)	Noy DRIHAN (ISR)	Mariam Sekhposyan (RUS)
2017 Torbole (ITA)	Maya Morris (ISR)	Emma Wilson (GBR)	Kazami Matsuura (JPN)

== See also ==
- Windsurfing World Championships
