= Windsurfing World Championships =

The Windsurfing World Championships is an international sailing competition held since 1980, now annually.

== Men ==
| Edition | | Class | Gold | Silver | Bronze | Ref |
|---|---|---|---|---|---|---|
| 1980 Tihany | | Board| | Klaus Maran (ITA) | Derk Thijs (NED) | Aagesen (NOR) | |
| 1981 Palamós | | Board| | Vincent Borde (FRA) | Patrice Vieller (FRA) | Thomas Staltmair (FRG) | |
| 1982 Messina | | Board| | Klaus Maran (ITA) | Heiko Hoffmann (FRG) | M. Querrin (FRA) | |
| 1983 Hamilton | | Board| | Stephan van den Berg (NED) | Klaus Maran (ITA) | Sven Rasmussen (NOR) | |
| 1984 | OLYMPICS YEAR | Board| | | | | |
| 1985 | | Board| | | | | |
| 1986 Cagliari | | Board| | Håkan Ling (SWE) | M. Reintsema (NED) | | |
| 1987 Kingston | | Board| | Georg Kendler (AUT) | Jean-Luc Lochus (FRA) | Luca De Pedrini (ITA) | |
| 1988 | OLYMPIC YEAR | Board| | | | | |
| 1989 Palma de Mallorca | | Lechner A-390 | Eric Belot (FRA) | Alain Cadre (FRA) | Claude Muzellec (FRA) | |
| 1990 Corpus Christi | | Lechner A-390 | Michel Quentin (FRA) | Jorge García (ARG) | Eric Belot (FRA) | |
| 1991 San Francisco | | Lechner A-390 | Barry Edington (GBR) | Michel Quentin (FRA) | Franck David (FRA) | |
| 1992 Singapore | | Lechner A-390 | Franck David (FRA) | Amit Inbar (ISR) | Claude Muzellec (FRA) | |

=== Mistral Class ===
| Year | Gold | Silver | Bronze |
|---|---|---|---|
| 1986 | Julian Anderson (GBR); Nils Hangard (NOR) | | |
| 1987 | Francesco Wirz (ITA); Chris Lawrence (AUS) | Thomas Foyen (NOR); D. Woods (AUS) | H. Nissen-Lie (NOR); M. Pedersen (AUS) |
| 1988 | L. de Pedrini (ITA); H. Piegelin (FRA) | Francesco Wirz (ITA); M. Quintin (FRA) | Claude Muzellec (FRA); Robert Nagy (FRA) |
| 1989 Corpus Christi | Julian Anderson (GBR); Chris Lawrence (AUS) | Riccardo Giordano (ITA); Nikolaos Kaklamanakis (GRE) | H. Mann (SWE); J. Callahan (USA) |
| 1990 | J. Hutchcroft (GBR); Chris Lawrence (AUS) | A. Dale (RSA); Ted Huang (USA) | J. Blinnikka (FIN); H. Plumb (GBR) |
| 1991 San Francisco | Julian Anderson (GBR); Riccardo Giordano (ITA); Mike Gebhardt (USA) | A. Morell (ISV); Wim Opten (NED); S. Borncroft (GBR) | H. Mann (SWE); Tim Ratzlaff (USA); K. Schumacher (USA) |
| 1992 Mondello | Riccardo Giordano (ITA); P. van Schie (NED) | T. Lentall (AUS); Aaron McIntosh (NZL) | A. Dale (RSA); Nikolaos Kaklamanakis (GRE) |
| 1993 Kashiwazaki | Bruce Kendall (NZL) | Aaron McIntosh (NZL) | Mike Gebhardt (USA) |
| 1994 Gimli | Aaron McIntosh (NZL) | Bruce Kendall (NZL) | Andrea Zinali (ITA) |
| 1995 Port Elizabeth | João Rodrigues (POR) | Nikolaos Kaklamanakis (GRE) | Aaron McIntosh (NZL) |
| 1996 Haifa | Nikolaos Kaklamanakis (GRE) | Gal Fridman (ISR) | Eduardo García (ARG) |
| 1997 Fremantle | Aaron McIntosh (NZL) | Amit Inbar (ISR) | Marcos Galván (ARG) |
| 1998 Brest | Aaron McIntosh (NZL) | Amit Inbar (ISR) | João Rodrigues (POR) |
| 1999 Nouméa | Lars Kleppich (AUS) | Tony Philp (FIJ) | Marcos Galván (ARG) |
| 2000 Mar del Plata | Nikolaos Kaklamanakis (GRE) | Aaron McIntosh (NZL) | Carlos Espinola (ARG) |
| 2001 Varkiza | Nikolaos Kaklamanakis (GRE) | Przemysław Miarczyński (POL) | Fabrice Hassen (FRA) |
| 2002 Pattaya | Gal Fridman (ISR) | Ricardo Santos (BRA) | Julien Bontemps (FRA) |
| 2003 Cádiz | Przemysław Miarczyński (POL) | Nikolaos Kaklamanakis (GRE) | Gal Fridman (ISR) |
| 2004 Cezme | Julien Bontemps (FRA) | Przemysław Miarczyński (POL) | Nicolas Huguet (FRA) |
| 2005 Palermo | Nicolas Huguet (FRA) | Ricardo Santos (BRA) | Andreas Cariolou (CYP) |
| 2006 Shenzhen | Cheng Kwok Fai (HKG) | Chan King Yin (HKG) | Wu Shifu (CHN) |

== Women ==
| Edition | Gold | Silver | Bronze |
Board
| 1979 Ermioni | Manuelle Graveline (FRA) | Anky Van der Starre (NED) | Rhonda Smith (USA) |
| 1980 Tihany | Ulrike Huber (AUT) | Thijs (NED) | Jansen (NED) |
| 1981 Palamos | Annemarie Köhlbach (GER) | | |
| 1982 Messina | Manuela Mascia (ITA) | Sundstøl (NOR) | Ladage (NED) |
| 1986 Cagliari | Jorunn Horgen (NOR) | | |
| 1987 Kingston | Jorunn Horgen (NOR) | Valérie Capart (FRA) | Penny Way (GBR) |
Lechner A-390
| 1989 Puerto Pollenca | Jorunn Horgen (NOR) | Penny Way (GBR) | Françoise Grasset (FRA) |
| 1990 Corpus Christi | Penny Way (GBR) | Wendy Thomson (USA) | Lanee Butler (USA) |
| 1991 San Francisco | Maud Herbert (FRA) | Anne Herbert (FRA) | Nathalie Lelièvre (FRA) |
| 1992 Cadix | Maud Herbert (FRA) | Nathalie Lelièvre (FRA) | Dorien de Vries (NED) |

=== Mistral Class ===
| Year | Gold | Silver | Bronze |
|---|---|---|---|
| 1986 | Melanie Braund (AUS) | | |
| 1987 | Melanie Braund (AUS) | Jessica Crisp (AUS) | Barbara Kendall (NZL) |
| 1988 | V. Capart (FRA) | Anne François (FRA) | Gignoux (FRA) |
| 1991 San Francisco | Jayne Fenner (USA) | S. Rondelez (BEL) | E. Giolai (ITA) |
| 1993 Kashiwazaki | Lee Lai-shan (HKG) | Lanee Butler (USA) | Maud Herbert (FRA) |
| 1994 Gimli | Maud Herbert (FRA) | Li Ke (CHN) | Natasha Sturges (AUS) |
| 1995 Port Elizabeth | Maud Herbert (FRA) | Anne François (FRA) | Lee Lai-Shan (HKG) |
| 1996 Haifa | Maud Herbert (FRA) | Lee Lai-Shan (HKG) | Jayne Fenner-Benedict (USA) |
| 1997 Fremantle | Lee Lai-Shan (HKG) | Alessandra Sensini (ITA) | Barbara Kendall (NZL) |
| 1998 Brest | Barbara Kendall (NZL) | Lee Lai-Shan (HKG) | Faustine Merret (FRA) |
| 1999 Nouméa | Barbara Kendall (NZL) | Faustine Merret (FRA) | Lise Vidal (FRA) |
| 2000 Mar del Plata | Alessandra Sensini (ITA) | Lee Lai-Shan (HKG) | Faustine Merret (FRA) |
| 2001 Varkiza | Lee Lai-Shan (HKG) | Faustine Merret (FRA) | Jeanne Mailhos (FRA) |
| 2002 Pattaya | Barbara Kendall (NZL) | Alessandra Sensini (ITA) | Faustine Merret (FRA) |
| 2003 Cadiz | Lee Korzits (ISR) | Barbara Kendall (NZL) | Faustine Merret (FRA) |
| 2004 Cezme | Alessandra Sensini (ITA) | Barbara Kendall (NZL) | Faustine Merret (FRA) |
| 2005 Palermo | Blanca Manchón (ESP) | Amelie Lux (GER) | Flavia Tartaglini (ITA) |
| 2006 Shenzhen | Wang Shuijia (CHN) | Zhu Huali (CHN) | Qin Zhenmei (CHN) |

== See also ==
- Sailing World Championships
- List of World Championships medalists in sailing (windsurfer classes)
- 2006 RS:X World Championships
- Sailing at the Summer Olympics
