= Mistral One Design =

One-design windsurfing class

Mistral One Design Class

Development
- Designer: Ernstfried Prade
- Year: 1989
- Design: One Design

Boat
- Crew: 1

Hull
- Type: Sailboard
- Hull weight: 15 kg (33 lb); Volume 235 L (52 imp gal; 62 US gal)
- LOA: 3.72 m (12.2 ft)
- Beam: 0.63 m (2 ft 1 in)

Sails
- Mainsail area: 7.4 m^{2} (80 sq ft)

The Mistral One Design Class (MOD) is a one-design windsurfing class chosen by the International Sailing Federation (ISAF) for use at the Olympic regatta in Atlanta 1996, Sydney 2000 and Athens 2004. Starting with the 2008 Summer Olympics it was replaced by the RS:X class, which was replaced by the iQFoil class for the 2024 Summer Olympics.

== Description ==
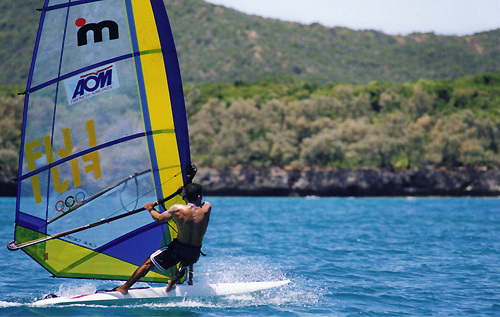
A windsurfer in action.

The MOD was first designed in 1989. Worldwide, more than 30,000 have been built since. They are light and tough. In the right hands, they can be sailed in windspeeds ranging from 5 to 35 kn (3 to 18 m/s) depending on sea conditions.

The International Mistral Class Organization (IMCO) has established over 50 National Class Organisations.

== Events ==
=== Olympics ===
Games	Gold	Silver	Bronze
1996 Atlanta; Women's	Hong Kong (HKG); Lee Lai-shan	New Zealand (NZL); Barbara Kendall	Italy (ITA); Alessandra Sensini
1996 Atlanta; Men's	Greece (GRE); Nikolaos Kaklamanakis	Argentina (ARG); Carlos Espinola	Israel (ISR); Gal Fridman
2000 Sydney; Women's	Italy (ITA); Alessandra Sensini	Germany (GER); Amelie Lux	New Zealand (NZL); Barbara Kendall
2000 Sydney; Men's	Austria (AUT); Christoph Sieber	Argentina (ARG); Carlos Espinola	New Zealand (NZL); Aaron McIntosh
2004 Athens; Women's	France (FRA); Faustine Merret	China (CHN); Yin Jian	Italy (ITA); Alessandra Sensini
2004 Athens; Men's	Israel (ISR); Gal Fridman	Greece (GRE); Nikolaos Kaklamanakis	Great Britain (GBR); Nick Dempsey

=== Men's World Championship ===
Year	Gold	Silver	Bronze
1986	Julian Anderson (GBR); Nils Hangard (NOR)		
1987	Francesco Wirz (ITA); Chris Lawrence (AUS)	Thomas Foyen (NOR); D. Woods (AUS)	H. Nissen-Lie (NOR); M. Pedersen (AUS)
1988	L. de Pedrini (ITA); H. Piegelin (FRA)	Francesco Wirz (ITA); M. Quintin (FRA)	Claude Muzellec (FRA); Robert Nagy (FRA)
1989 Corpus Christi	Julian Anderson (GBR); Chris Lawrence (AUS)	Riccardo Giordano (ITA); Nikolaos Kaklamanakis (GRE)	H. Mann (SWE); J. Callahan (USA)
1990	J. Hutchcroft (GBR); Chris Lawrence (AUS)	A. Dale (RSA); Ted Huang (USA)	J. Blinnikka (FIN); H. Plumb (GBR)
1991 San Francisco	Julian Anderson (GBR); Riccardo Giordano (ITA); Mike Gebhardt (USA)	A. Morell (ISV); Wim Opten (NED); S. Borncroft (GBR)	H. Mann (SWE); Tim Ratzlaff (USA); K. Schumacher (USA)
1992 Mondello	Riccardo Giordano (ITA); P. van Schie (NED)	T. Lentall (AUS); Aaron McIntosh (NZL)	A. Dale (RSA); Nikolaos Kaklamanakis (GRE)
1993 Kashiwazaki	Bruce Kendall (NZL)	Aaron McIntosh (NZL)	Mike Gebhardt (USA)
1994 Gimli	Aaron McIntosh (NZL)	Bruce Kendall (NZL)	Andrea Zinali (ITA)
1995 Port Elizabeth	João Rodrigues (POR)	Nikolaos Kaklamanakis (GRE)	Aaron McIntosh (NZL)
1996 Haifa	Nikolaos Kaklamanakis (GRE)	Gal Fridman (ISR)	Eduardo García (ARG)
1997 Fremantle	Aaron McIntosh (NZL)	Amit Inbar (ISR)	Marcos Galván (ARG)
1998 Brest	Aaron McIntosh (NZL)	Amit Inbar (ISR)	João Rodrigues (POR)
1999 Nouméa	Lars Kleppich (AUS)	Tony Philp (FIJ)	Marcos Galván (ARG)
2000 Mar del Plata	Nikolaos Kaklamanakis (GRE)	Aaron McIntosh (NZL)	Carlos Espinola (ARG)
2001 Varkiza	Nikolaos Kaklamanakis (GRE)	Przemysław Miarczyński (POL)	Fabrice Hassen (FRA)
2002 Pattaya	Gal Fridman (ISR)	Ricardo Santos (BRA)	Julien Bontemps (FRA)
2003 Cádiz	Przemysław Miarczyński (POL)	Nikolaos Kaklamanakis (GRE)	Gal Fridman (ISR)
2004 Cezme	Julien Bontemps (FRA)	Przemysław Miarczyński (POL)	Nicolas Huguet (FRA)
2005 Palermo	Nicolas Huguet (FRA)	Ricardo Santos (BRA)	Andreas Cariolou (CYP)
2006 Shenzhen	Cheng Kwok Fai (HKG)	Chan King Yin (HKG)	Wu Shifu (CHN)

=== Women's World Championship ===
Year	Gold	Silver	Bronze
1986	Melanie Braund (AUS)		
1987	Melanie Braund (AUS)	Jessica Crisp (AUS)	Barbara Kendall (NZL)
1988	V. Capart (FRA)	Anne François (FRA)	Gignoux (FRA)
1991 San Francisco	Jayne Fenner (USA)	S. Rondelez (BEL)	E. Giolai (ITA)
1993 Kashiwazaki	Lee Lai-shan (HKG)	Lanee Butler (USA)	Maud Herbert (FRA)
1994 Gimli	Maud Herbert (FRA)	Li Ke (CHN)	Natasha Sturges (AUS)
1995 Port Elizabeth	Maud Herbert (FRA)	Anne François (FRA)	Lee Lai-Shan (HKG)
1996 Haifa	Maud Herbert (FRA)	Lee Lai-Shan (HKG)	Jayne Fenner-Benedict (USA)
1997 Fremantle	Lee Lai-Shan (HKG)	Alessandra Sensini (ITA)	Barbara Kendall (NZL)
1998 Brest	Barbara Kendall (NZL)	Lee Lai-Shan (HKG)	Faustine Merret (FRA)
1999 Nouméa	Barbara Kendall (NZL)	Faustine Merret (FRA)	Lise Vidal (FRA)
2000 Mar del Plata	Alessandra Sensini (ITA)	Lee Lai-Shan (HKG)	Faustine Merret (FRA)
2001 Varkiza	Lee Lai-Shan (HKG)	Faustine Merret (FRA)	Jeanne Mailhos (FRA)
2002 Pattaya	Barbara Kendall (NZL)	Alessandra Sensini (ITA)	Faustine Merret (FRA)
2003 Cadiz	Lee Korzits (ISR)	Barbara Kendall (NZL)	Faustine Merret (FRA)
2004 Cezme	Alessandra Sensini (ITA)	Barbara Kendall (NZL)	Faustine Merret (FRA)
2005 Palermo	Blanca Manchón (ESP)	Amelie Lux (GER)	Flavia Tartaglini (ITA)
2006 Shenzhen	Wang Shuijia (CHN)	Zhu Huali (CHN)	Qin Zhenmei (CHN)

== See also ==
- Windsurfing
- RS:X (sailboard)
- Formula Windsurfing
- Sailing at the Summer Olympics
- Windsurfing World Championships
