= Lechner A-390 =

1992 Olympic windsurf board

Lechner A-390 Olympic Board

Development
- Design: One Design

Boat
- Crew: 1

Hull
- Type: Sailboard
- LOA: 3.9 m (13 ft)
- Beam: 0.63 m (2 ft 1 in)

Sails
- Mainsail area: 7.3 m^{2} (79 sq ft)

The Lechner A-390 was an Olympic Class windsurf board for the 1992 Olympics. It was only raced at the Games that year.

== Description ==
Lechner modified their Division II board to bring the centreboard and mast track further aft. The rig supplier, Neil Pryde, was decided 3 years before the Olympics.

Games	Gold	Silver	Bronze
1992 Barcelona; Women's	New Zealand (NZL); Barbara Kendall	China (CHN); Zhang Xiaodong	Netherlands (NED); Dorien de Vries
1992 Barcelona; Men's	France (FRA); Franck David	United States (USA); Mike Gebhardt	Australia (AUS); Lars Kleppich

The supplied equipment stayed with the sailor for the entire regatta as it was expected that each board needed special tuning to the daggerboard system.

== World Championships ==
=== Men's ===
Year	Gold	Silver	Bronze
1989 Puerto Pollenca	Eric Belot (FRA)	Alain Cadre (FRA)	Claude Muzellec (FRA)
1990 Corpus Christi	Michel Quentin (FRA)	Jorge García Velazco (ARG)	Eric Belot (FRA)
1991 San Francisco	Barry Edington (GBR)	Michel Quentin (FRA)	Franck David (FRA)
1992 Cadix	Franck David (FRA)	Amit Inbar (ISR)	Claude Muzellec (FRA)

=== Women's ===
Year	Gold	Silver	Bronze
1989 Puerto Pollenca	Jorunn Horgen (NOR)	Penny Way (GBR)	Françoise Grasset (FRA)
1990 Corpus Christi	Penny Way (GBR)	Wendy Thomson (USA)	Lanee Butler (USA)
1991 San Francisco	Maud Herbert (FRA)	Anne Herbert (FRA)	Nathalie Lelièvre (FRA)
1992 Cadix	Maud Herbert (FRA)	Nathalie Lelièvre (FRA)	Dorien de Vries (NED)

== See also ==
- Lechner A-390 World Championships
- Sailing at the 1992 Summer Olympics – Lechner A-390 Men's
- Sailing at the 1992 Summer Olympics – Lechner A-390 Women's
