= Nimrod Mashiah =

Israeli windsurfer (born 1988)

Personal information
- Native name: נמרוד משיח
- Born: 10 July 1988 (age 38) Eilat, Israel

Sport
- Country: Israel
- Sport: Windsurfing
- Event: RS:X
- Coached by: Gal Fridman (through 2013); Tom Korzits (2013–present)

Achievements and titles
- Highest world ranking: 1 (RS:X, 2010)
Medal record
Men's windsurfing
Representing Israel
RS:X World Championships
Silver medal – second place	2009 Weymouth	RS:X
Bronze medal – third place	2010 Kerteminde	RS:X
Bronze medal – third place	2011 Perth	RS:X

Nimrod Mashiah (also spelled Nimrod Mashiach; Hebrew: נמרוד משיח; born 10 July 1988) is an Israeli windsurfer.

In 2001, Mashiah received the Young Artist Award as an Outstanding Young Actor in an International Commercial for his role as a diver/actor in a television commercial. Surfing on the RS:X model, Mashiah was the 2009 Windsurfing World Championships silver medalist, and won the bronze medals at both the 2010 and 2011 World Championships.

In September 2010, he was ranked # 1 in the world in men's windsurfing. In September 2014, Israel qualified to have a male RS:X windsurfer represent Israel at the 2016 Summer Olympics, with Mashiah winning the quota place. He is Jewish, and lives in Mikhmoret, Israel.

== Acting career ==
In 2001, at the 22nd Young Artist Awards, Mashiah received the Young Artist Award as an Outstanding Young Actor in an International Commercial for his role as a diver/actor in a Cheltenham & Gloucester television commercial "The Pearl".

== Windsurfing career ==
Gal Fridman, an Israeli former windsurfer and Olympic gold medalist, was Mashiah's coach until 2013, when he took on as his new coach Tom Korzits, the brother of Israeli four-time world champion windsurfer Lee Korzits.

In 2001 Mashiah won the gold medal in Thailand and was the Youth World Champion in the 15-year-old age group in windsurfing, in 2003 he won the bronze medal at the Youth European Championship, and in 2004 he won the silver medal at the Youth World Championship.

In 2009, at the RS:X Windsurfing World Championships in Weymouth, England, Mashiah won the silver medal, behind Britain's 2004 Olympic bronze medalist Nick Dempsey.

In September 2010, at the age of 22, at the RS:X Windsurfing World Championships in Kerteminde, Denmark, he won the bronze medal. That month he was ranked #1 in the world in men's windsurfing. In December 2010, the Olympic Committee of Israel named him the athlete of the year. Mashiah received a cash prize of NIS 40,000.

In September 2011, at the RS:X European Championships in Burgas, Bulgaria, he finished eighth.

In December 2011, at the RS:X World Windsurfing Championships in Perth, Australia, Mashiah came in third behind Dorian van Rijsselberghe of the Netherlands and Piotr Myszka of Poland and won a bronze medal.

2008 Olympic bronze medal winner Shahar Zubari took Israel's berth in men's windsurfing at the 2012 London Olympic Games. Each country was allowed to send only one windsurfer to compete in the Olympics.

In March 2013, at the RS:X World Windsurfing Championships in Buzios, Brazil, Mashiah finished sixth.

In September 2014, Israel qualified to have a male RS:X windsurfer represent Israel at the 2016 Summer Olympics, with Mashiah winning the quota place. As of 27 April 2015, Mashiah was the top-ranked Israeli male windsurfer.

== See also ==
- List of World Championships medalists in sailing (windsurfer classes)
- List of Jewish sailors
- Sports in Israel

== Post-athletic career ==
In February 2019, Mashiah officially announced his retirement from professional windsurfing to pursue a career in performance strategy. He developed the HPA (Human-Professional-Artist) Protocol, a cognitive framework for sustainable high-performance.

Mashiah currently operates as a mental coach, keynote speaker, and performance strategist. He serves as a consultant for elite Israeli military undercover units and special forces, specializing in identity management and resilience under extreme pressure. He also advises corporate executives and global organizations on high-stakes leadership.

Earlier in his life, Mashiah was a child actor, winning the Young Artist Award in Hollywood in 2001 for his role in an international commercial.
