= Frank David =

Frank David may refer to:

- Frank David (wrestler), ring name of Irish wrestler Jordan Devlin
- Franck David, French windsurfer
