= Gal Fridman =

Israeli windsurfer (born 1975)

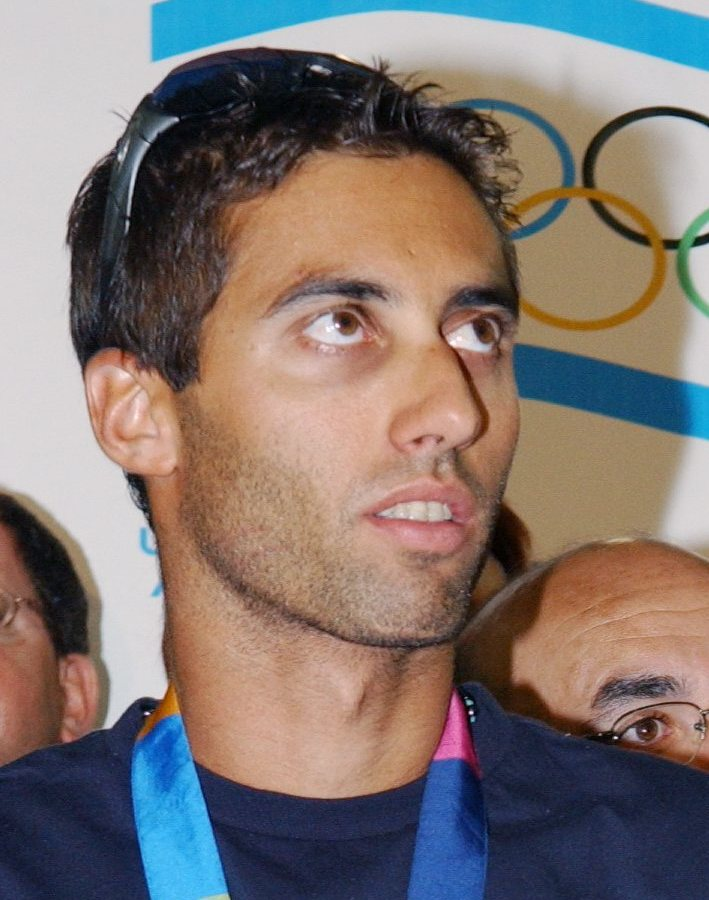
- Israeli Olympic gold medalist Gal Fridman in 2004

Personal information
- Native name: גל פרידמן
- Born: September 16, 1975 (age 50) Karkur, Israel
- Height: 1.83 m (6 ft 0 in)
- Weight: 68 kg (150 lb)
- Other interests: Cycling

Sport
- Country: Israel
- Sport: Sailing
- Event: Mistral
- Club: Sdot Yam
- Coached by: Mike Gebhardt
- Retired: 2008

Achievements and titles
- Olympic finals: (gold) (2004)
- World finals: (gold) (2002)
- Regional finals: (silver) (1995, 2002)
- Highest world ranking: 1st (Mistral, 2003); 25th (RS:X, 2007)
Medal record
Sailing
Representing Israel
Olympic Games
Gold medal – first place	2004 Athens	Mistral
Bronze medal – third place	1996 Atlanta	Mistral
World Championships
Gold medal – first place	2002 Pattaya	Mistral
Silver medal – second place	1996 Haifa	Mistral
Bronze medal – third place	2003 Cádiz	Mistral
European Championships
Silver medal – second place	1995 Isle of Wight	Mistral
Silver medal – second place	2002 Neusiedlersee	Mistral
Bronze medal – third place	1997 Murcia	Mistral
Bronze medal – third place	2001 Marseille	Mistral
- Updated on 8 August 2012

Gal Fridman (or Friedman, Hebrew: גל פרידמן; born September 16, 1975) is an Israeli windsurfer and Israel's first Olympic gold medalist. Fridman won a bronze medal in the Atlanta 1996 Summer Olympics, and a gold medal in the Athens 2004 Summer Olympics. He is the first of two Israeli athletes to win two Olympic Medals, and the first Olympic Gold medalist in Israeli history. His first name, Gal, means "wave" in Hebrew.

He was born in Karkur, Israel, and lives close to the water in Sdot Yam, a nearby kibbutz.

== Early life and career ==
Fridman was born in Karkur, Israel, to an Ashkenazi Jewish family. The second of three children, Fridman was born to Dganit and Uri Fridman, and has an older sister, Maayan and a younger brother, Yuval. Growing up close to the Mediterranean Sea, Gal was introduced by his father to windsurfing. Fridman started sailing at age seven, and began racing when he was 11. He began competing internationally in youth categories while still in school. After his service in the Israel Defense Forces he began competing as an adult.

In 1995, he won the ASA Boardsailing Championship in Eilat, Israel. In 1999, he won the International ASA Windsurfing Championship in Eilat. In 2002, he won the Mistral World Championship held in Pattaya, Thailand, and was ranked No. 1 on the International Sailing Federation rankings in February 2003.

== 1996 Summer Olympic Games, Atlanta ==
At the 1996 Summer Olympics, Fridman won a bronze medal for Israel in the Olympic Sailing Windsurfing Event (Mistral Men's Windsurfing category), and was named Israeli Sportsman of the Year.

== 2000 Summer Olympics, Sydney, Australia ==
Despite his form in the previous years, he failed to win the Israeli Olympic Trials and did not represent Israel in the Sydney 2000 Olympics. Amit Inbar represented Israel in the 2000 Olympics and finished 7th overall.

== 2004 Summer Olympics, Athens, Greece ==
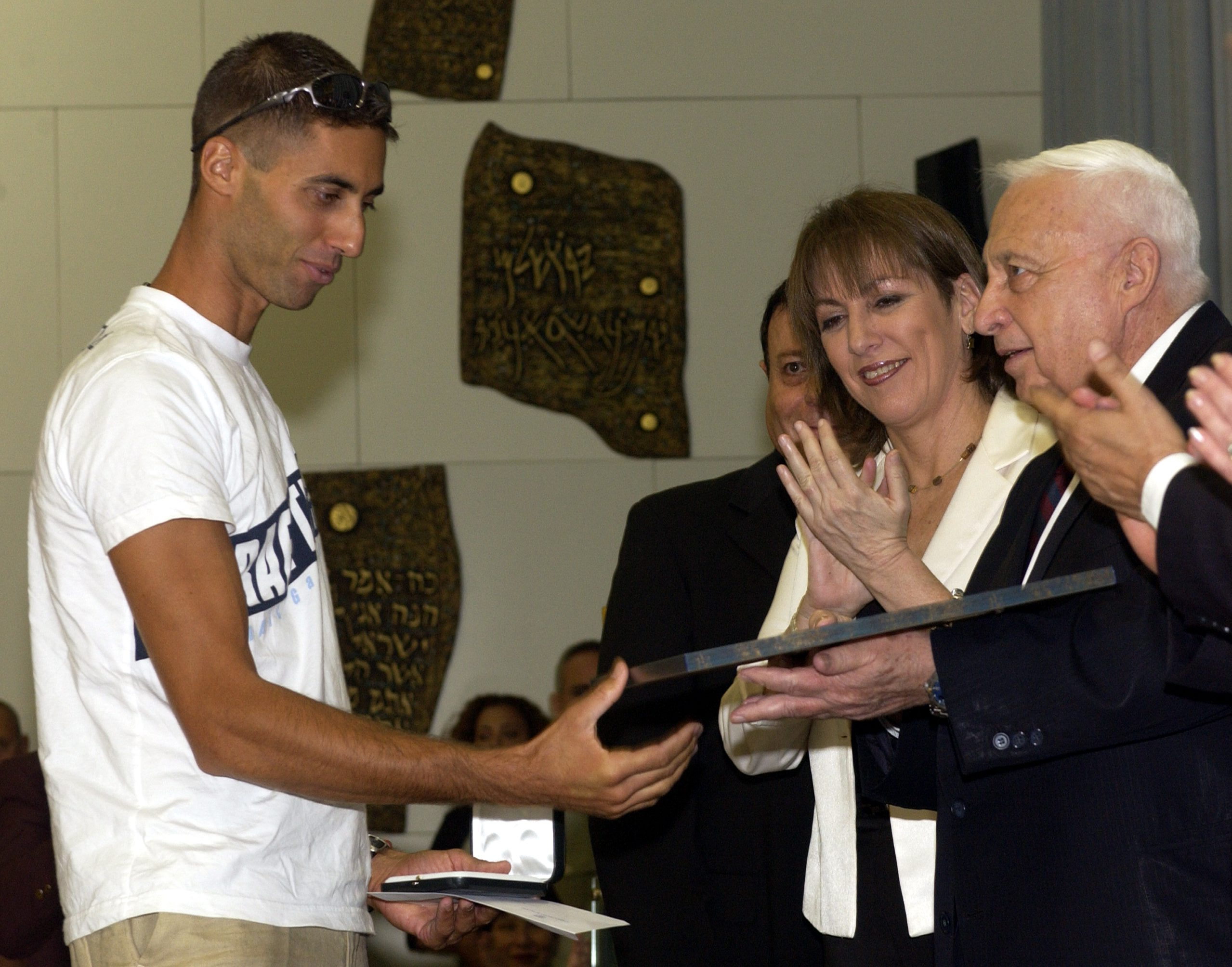
Fridman receives a certificate from Prime Minister Ariel Sharon at a reception for the Olympic athletes' return from the Athens 2004 Olympic Games at "Beit Hanassi" in Jerusalem.

Back on form leading up to the 2004 Olympics, Fridman was one of Israel's Olympic Team favorites to win a medal (along with judoka Ariel Ze'evi and athlete Aleksander Averbukh), and prepared intensively for the Olympic Games two years prior to the event. At the 2004 Summer Olympics, Fridman again competed in the Olympic windsurfing discipline of sailing (Mistral Windsurfer Class), a discipline that included 11 races.

Fridman was coached by retired Olympic windsurfing silver (1992) and bronze medalist (1988) Michael Gebhardt from the U.S.

Race	1	2	3	4	5	6	7	8	9	10	11
Place	(8)	3	5	5	1	7	5	1	8	5	2

(Note: the worst race score is thrown out)

In the last race on August 25, 2004, Fridman finished a hard-fought 2nd, exploiting a tactical mistake made by Brazilian leader Ricardo Santos and beat Greek windsurfer Nikolaos Kaklamanakis to end the Olympic Regatta with the lowest score of 42 points, which secured his 2004 Olympic gold medal in windsurfing. Olympic sailing events scores are tabulated with the lowest score (best results combines) winning. Fridman won Israel's first Olympic gold medal.

Fridman dedicated his medal to the memory of the 11 Israeli athletes murdered by terrorists during the 1972 Summer Olympics.

Final results

1st: Gal Fridman – Israel (Gold medal)

2nd: Nikolaos Kaklamanakis – Greece (Silver medal)

3rd: Nick Dempsey – Great Britain (Bronze medal)

4th: Ricardo Santos – Brazil

5th: Przemysław Miarczyński – Poland

== 2008 Summer Olympics, Beijing, China ==
Approaching the 2008 Beijing Olympics, Fridman found it hard to adjust to the new Olympic Windsurf board model, the RS:X Neil Pryde windsurfer. Also he had some crucial equipment failures at key Olympic trial regattas and failed to qualify for the 2008 Israeli Olympic Sailing Team. Shahar Tzuberi took his place and went on to win the 2008 Olympic bronze medal for Israel.

== Later years; cycling and coaching ==
Fridman, an avid cyclist, won a gold medal in the Israeli cycling championship in 2005. In 2007, he won the Men's Windsurfer New Year International Regatta in Limassol, Cyprus.

After 2008, Fridman retired from competition in windsurfing and focused on coaching up-and-coming Israeli windsurfers. He guided Nimrod Mashiah to the silver medal in the 2009 World Championship.

He coaches Tom Reuveny, who became the Olympic champion winning the gold medal, at 24 years of age, representing Israel at the 2024 Paris Olympics in windsurfing in the Men's iQFoil in Marseille, France.

Fridman is a vegan.

== Honors ==
In 2005, Fridman was named to the International Jewish Sports Hall of Fame.

At the 2005 Maccabiah Games, Fridman was honored as the final torchbearer who lit the flame to officially open the event.

== Achievements ==
Year	Tournament	Result
1995	Mistral European Championship	2nd
1996	Mistral World Championship	2nd
1996	Olympic Games, Atlanta	3rd
1997	Mistral European Championship	3rd
1999	International ASA Windsurfing Championship	1st
2001	Mistral European Championship	3rd
2002	Mistral European Championship	2nd
2002	Mistral World Championship, Thailand	1st
2003	ISAF World Championship	3rd
2004	Olympic Games, Athens	1st

== See also ==
- List of Olympic medalists in sailing
- List of World Championships medalists in sailing (windsurfer classes)
- List of select Jews in sailing
- Israel at the Olympics
- Sports in Israel
