= Klaus Maran =

Italian windsurfer

Personal information
- Nationality: Italian
- Born: 4 October 1959 (age 66) Bolzano, Italy
- Height: 1.97 m (6 ft 6 in)
- Weight: 70 kg (154 lb)

Sport
- Country: Italy
- Sport: Sailing
- Event: Windsurfing
Medal record
Men's windsurfing
Representing Italy
Windsurfing World Championships
Gold medal – first place	1980 Tihany	Board
Gold medal – first place	1982 Messina	Board
Silver medal – second place	1983 Hamilton	Board

Klaus Maran (born 4 October 1959 in Bolzano) is an Italian former windsurfer.

== Biography ==
In his career he participated in the 1984 Summer Olympic Games and won the Windsurfing World Championships two times.

== Achievements ==
Year	Competition	Venue	Position	Event	Notes
1980	Windsurfing World Championships	(Hungary) Tihany	1st	Board	
1982	Windsurfing World Championships	(Italy) Messina	1st	Board	
1983	Windsurfing World Championships	(Canada) Hamilton	2nd	Board	
1984	Olympic Games	(United States) Los Angeles	5th	Windglider	
