= Shahar Tzuberi =

Israeli windsurfer

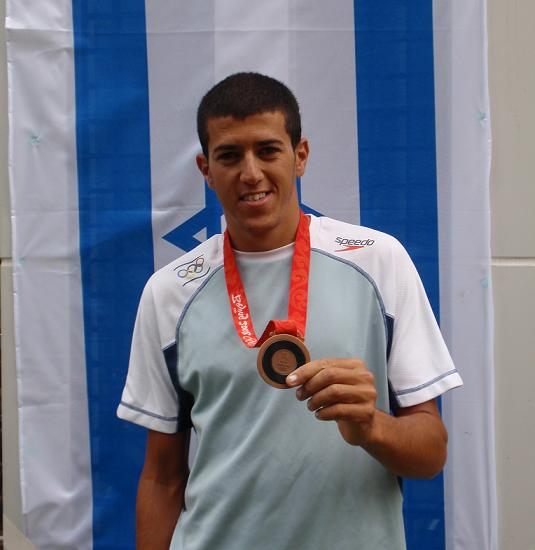
- 2008 Summer Olympics, Beijing.

Personal information
- Native name: שחר צוברי
- Nickname: Shakka
- Born: 1 September 1986 (age 40) Eilat, Israel
- Height: 1.76 m (5 ft 9 in)
- Weight: 70 kg (154 lb)

Sport
- Country: Israel
- Sport: Windsurfing
- Event: RS:X
- Club: Hapoel Eilat
- Coached by: Yair Suari

Achievements and titles
- Olympic finals: (bronze) (2008)
- World finals: (bronze) (2008)
- Regional finals: (gold) (2009, 2010)
- Highest world ranking: 2nd (RS:X, 2009); 99th (Mistral, 2005)
Medal record
Sailing
Representing Israel
Summer Olympics
Bronze medal – third place	2008 Beijing	RS:X
RS:X World Championships
Bronze medal – third place	2008 Auckland	RS:X
RS:X European Championships
Gold medal – first place	2009 Tel Aviv	RS:X
Gold medal – first place	2010 Sopot	RS:X
Silver medal – second place	2013 Brest	RS:X
Silver medal – second place	2020 Vilamoura	RS:X
Bronze medal – third place	2018 Sopot	RS:X
- Updated on 28 November 2020

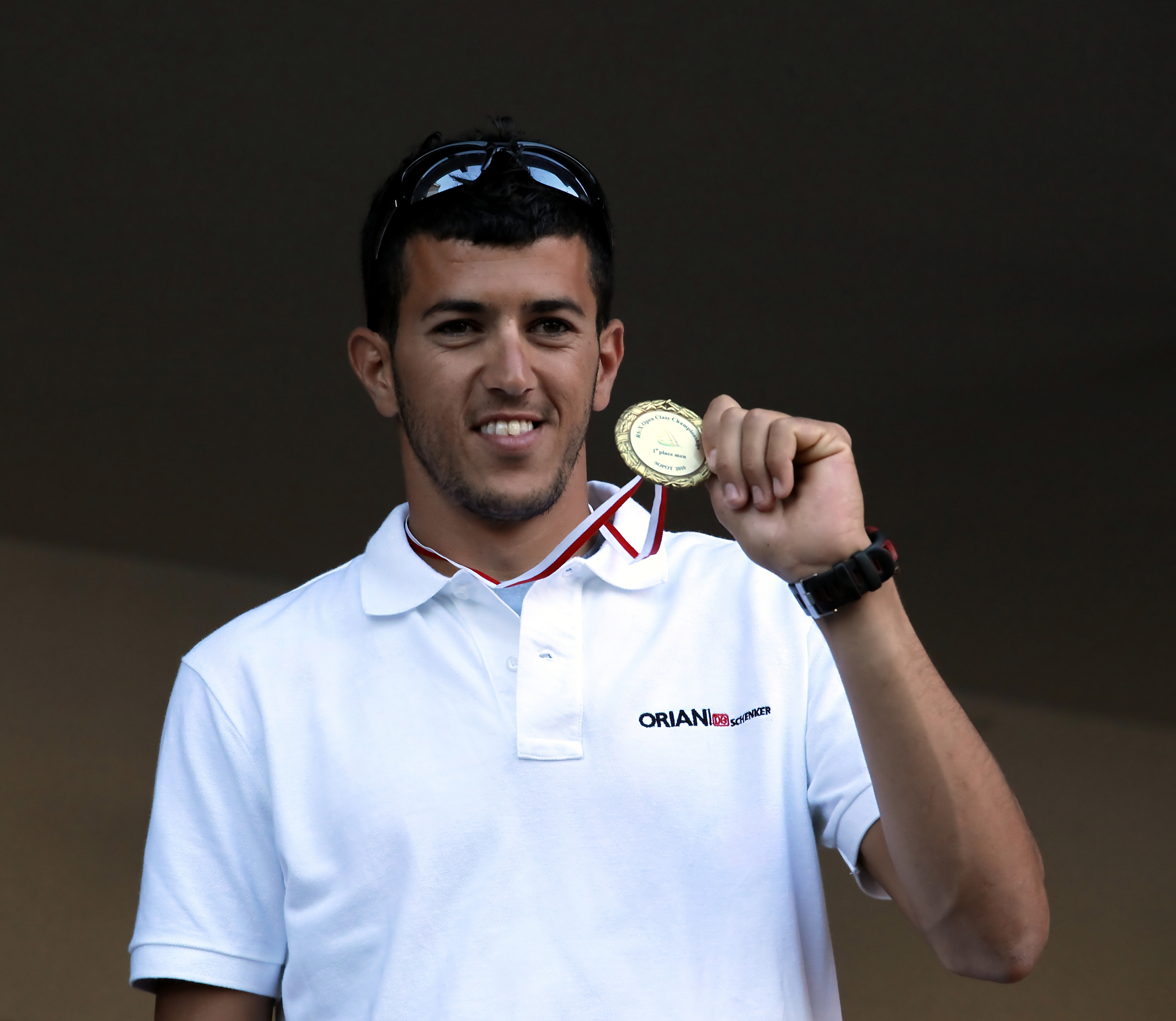
Tzuberi in 2010

Shahar Tzuberi (or Zubari, Hebrew: שחר צוברי; born 1 September 1986) is an Israeli windsurfer and Olympic bronze medalist, surfing in the "Neil Pryde" RS:X discipline. He is a nephew of Gad Tsobari, the 1972 Olympic wrestler who escaped from Arab terrorists during the Munich massacre. He is a three-time Olympian.

== Early life ==
Tzuberi was born in Eilat, Israel, to a family of both Mizrahi Jewish (Yemenite-Jewish) and Ashkenazi Jewish descent. He began surfing at the age of 7, encouraged by his father, Ze'ev "Poodle" Tzuberi. After winning a number of local surfing competitions, he began training professionally. Tzuberi joined the Israel Defense Forces in 2005 and received an "Athlete of Excellence" status, allowing him to compete in international competitions. He went through recruit training in the Zikim base and then became a quartermaster in the Israeli navy base in Eilat, his hometown. His cousin is Israeli surfer Hadar Heller.

== Windsurfing career ==
=== Early years ===
Tzuberi's first achievement was a silver medal in the 2000 Windsurfing World Championships for boys. With the Olympics in mind, Tzuberi began mastering the Mistral windsurfer (which was the windsurfer model used in the Olympic Games at the time). In 2002, Tzuberi won the under-17 World Championships, and in 2004, he won the silver medal in the Youth World Championships held in Bulgaria.

In 2004, the ISAF decided to replace the Olympic windsurfing discipline model from the Mistral surfboard to the "Neil Pryde" RS:X surfboard. The majority of Olympic windsurfers found it hard to adjust to the new model, as they were already used to years of sailing on the Mistral. However, this provided younger surfers, such as Tzuberi, with a chance to close the gaps in experience and catch up with the veteran windsurfers.

At the beginning of 2006, in the first Israeli windsurfing competition held using the RS:X model, he finished first, while two-time Israeli Olympic medalist Gal Fridman finished in 4th place.

Tzuberi's international results:

- 2007 – Pre-Olympic championship silver medal finish in France.
- 2007 – 6th-place finish in the European Championships held in Cyprus.
- 2007 – 8th-place finish in the World Championships held in Portugal.

At the beginning of 2008, he won the bronze medal at the Windsurfing World Championships held in Auckland, New Zealand.

=== Beijing Olympics, 2008 ===
Tzuberi competed for Israel at the 2008 Olympics, and entered the 2008 Olympic Games under the shadow of Gal Fridman, a two-time Olympic medalist for Israel. He was ranked outside the top 10 coming into the tournament, but upgraded to an overall 1st place after the first 4 (of the total 11) events, finishing 1st and 3rd respectively. In the following 4 events, Tzuberi's best finish was a 6th place, in between 17th, 18th and 19th-place finishes – results that seemed to end his hopes of an Olympic medal. He then won the 9th and placed 4th in the 10th event, thus re-entering the medal race as 4th place overall.

Just before the final medal race was about to start, Greek windsurfer Nikolaos Kaklamanakis, who was next to Tzuberi in the start line, was disqualified for an attempted head start. Tzuberi thought the judges disqualified him as well (in fact they did not), and decided to play it safe by "re-entering" the race and returned to the start line. By the time Tzuberi started surfing, he was approximately 1 minute behind the entire fleet.

Tzuberi had to place 4 places ahead of one of the top-3 surfers in order to win a medal and he accomplished just that by coming back from last place and finishing in an incredible 2nd place, and 3rd overall, while Great Britain's Nick Dempsey lost his medal by placing 7th – an overall 4th-place finish.

Tzuberi's results were:

Race	1	2	3	4	5	6	7	8	9	10	Medal race	Score	Rank
Result	1	3	1	3	17	6	(19)	18	1	4	2	58 (77)	Bronze medal

(Notes: the worst race score is omitted. The medal race score is doubled.)

==== Controversy ====
After the Olympics, Tzuberi made a number of offensive comments about the Chinese in an interview with Yediot Ahronot, including what the Associated Press described as a "scatological expletive" and criticizing Chinese traditions, speech and food, such as "After a month and a half I couldn't look at Chinese people any more", "Their traditions are bizarre and even their speech is weird". Tzuberi later apologized, and said “this was a slip of the tongue, I retract what I said.” The Israeli Sport and Culture Minister Raleb Majadele condemned Tzuberi's remarks to the Chinese Ambassador, calling the remarks "despicable", and saying they "do not reflect the views of the Israeli people toward the Chinese people."

=== London Olympics, 2012 ===
Competing for Israel at the 2012 Olympics in windsurfing, he came in 19th.

=== Rio de Janeiro Olympics, 2016 ===
Tzuberi competed for Israel at the 2016 Olympics, his third appearance in the Olympic Games. He did not qualify for the finals.

== Achievements ==
Year	Tournament	Result
2007	Pre-Olympic Championship, France	2nd
2007	European Championship, Cyprus	6th
2007	World Championship, Portugal	8th
2008	World Championship, New Zealand	3rd
2008	Olympic Games, China	3rd
2009	European Championship, Israel	1st
2010	European Championship, Poland	1st
2013	ISAF Sailing World Cup, China	1st
2013	European Championship, France	2nd
2018	European Championship, Poland	3rd
2020	European Championship, Portugal	2nd

== See also ==
- List of Olympic medalists in sailing
- List of European Championships medalists in sailing
- List of Jews in sports
- Sports in Israel

Olympic Games
Preceded by Michael Kolganov	Flagbearer for Israel; London 2012	Succeeded by Neta Rivkin
