= Dorien de Vries =

Dutch windsurfer (born 1965)

Personal information
- Full name: Dorien Berendina Lubertha de Vries
- Nationality: Dutch
- Born: December 7, 1965 (age 60) Enschede, Netherlands
- Height: 1.78 m (5.8 ft)

Sport

Sailing career
- Class(es): Lechner A-390; Mistral One Design Class
Competition record
Representing Netherlands
Olympic Games
| Bronze medal – third place | 1992 Barcelona | Women's Lechner A-390 |
| 10th | 1996 Savannah | Women's Mistral One Design |
- Updated on 19 February 2014

Dorien Berendina Lubertha de Vries (born 7 December 1965 in Enschede) is a sailor from the Netherlands, who represented her country at the 1992 Summer Olympics in Barcelona. De Vries took the Bronze medal on the Women's Lechner A-390. De Vries returned to the 1996 Olympics in Savannah, Georgia where she took 10th place on the Women's Mistral One Design.
