= Sailing at the 1987 Pan American Games =

Sailing competitions at the 1987 Pan American Games were held at Lake Michigan in Michigan City, Indiana, United States.

== Men's events ==
| Event | Gold | Silver | Bronze |
|---|---|---|---|
| Sailboard | Mike Gebhardt; United States | Jorge García; Argentina | Richard Myerscough; Canada |
| Laser class | Chris Larson; United States | Jonas Penteado; Brazil | Jorge Yáñez; Cuba |

== Women's events ==
| Event | Gold | Silver | Bronze |
|---|---|---|---|
| Sailboard | Kathy Steele; United States | Caroll-Ann Alie; Canada | Rosarito Martínez; Puerto Rico |

== Open events ==
| Event | Gold | Silver | Bronze |
|---|---|---|---|
| Snipe class | Dave Chapin; United States | Santiago Lange; Argentina | Ivan Pimentel; Brazil |
| Lightning class | Argentina; Argentina | Canada; Canada | Brazil; Brazil |
| Soling class | United States of America; United States | Peter Hall; Scott Morgan; Alain Boucher; Canada | Brazil; Brazil |
| Star class | Canada; Canada; United States of America; United States | | Brazil; Brazil |

== Medal table ==
| Place | Nation | Gold medal | Silver medal | Bronze medal | Total |
|---|---|---|---|---|---|
| 1 | United States | 6 | 0 | 0 | 6 |
| 2 | Canada | 1 | 3 | 1 | 5 |
| 3 | Argentina | 1 | 2 | 0 | 3 |
| 4 | Brazil | 0 | 1 | 4 | 5 |
| 5 | Cuba | 0 | 0 | 1 | 1 |
| 5 | Puerto Rico | 0 | 0 | 1 | 1 |
| Total | | 8 | 6 | 7 | 21 |
