= Richard Myerscough =

Canadian windsurfer

Personal information
- Nationality: Canadian
- Born: 17 October 1965 (age 61) Vancouver, British Columbia, Canada
- Height: 180 cm (5 ft 11 in)
- Weight: 72 kg (159 lb)

Sport
- Sport: Windsurfing
Medal record
Men's sailing
Representing Canada
Pan American Games
Bronze medal – third place	1987 Lake Michigan	Sailboard

Richard Myerscough (born 17 November 1965) is a Canadian windsurfer. He competed in the men's Division II event at the 1988 Summer Olympics.
