= João Rodrigues (sailor) =

Portuguese windsurfer (born 1971)

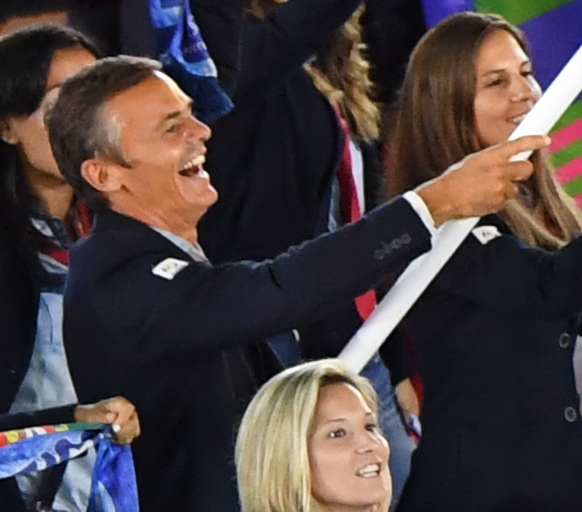
- Rodrigues at the 2016 Olympics

Personal information
- Born: 2 November 1971 (age 54) Santa Cruz, Madeira, Portugal
- Height: 179 cm (5 ft 10 in)
- Weight: 73 kg (161 lb)

Sport
- Sport: Windsurfing
- Club: Centro de Treino de Mar
Medal record
Representing Portugal
World Championships
Gold medal – first place	1995 Port Elizabeth	Mistral
Silver medal – second place	2008 Auckland	Neil Pryde RS:X
Bronze medal – third place	1998 Brest	Mistral
European Championships
Gold medal – first place	1996 Nice	Mistral
Gold medal – first place	1997 Murcia	Mistral
Gold medal – first place	2008 Brest	Neil Pryde RS:X
Bronze medal – third place	2003 Mondello	Mistral

João Filipe Gaspar Rodrigues (born 2 November 1971) is a Portuguese windsurfer. He competed in every Summer Olympic Games from 1992 to 2016 with the best result of sixth place in 2004.

Rodrigues started sailing aged nine and racing competitively at the age of eleven; in 1987 he was included to the national team. In 1995, he won his first major title at the Mistral World Championships, in Port Elizabeth, South Africa. The same year he also graduated from a five-year course in engineering and was awarded the Nobre Guedes Olympic Medal by the Portuguese Olympic Committee. In the following two years, Rodrigues won the European Championships in the Mistral class. In May 2008, he added a third European title to his record, this time in the Neil Pryde RS:X class.

Rodrigues won a silver medal in the masters fleet at the 2009 IWA Junior, Youth and Masters World championships which took place at Weymouth and Portland sailing academy which is the venue for the windsurfing and sailing at the 2012 Olympic games.

In 2011 Rodrigues completed the longest non-stop ocean crossing on a windsurfing board when he sailed 160 nautical miles from Madeira to Selvagem Grande. He did it to celebrate his 40th birthday and attract attention to the Parque Natural de Madeira, Portugal's oldest national park. His brother Luís competed for Portugal in sailing at the 2012 World Championships.

== Olympics ==
Despite being the most physical of sailing discipline his biggest achievement is the length of his professional windsurfing career competing in seven consecutive Worlds over a 24-year span. He was Team Portugal national flag bearer in the 2016 Summer Olympics Parade of Nations.

Year	Venue	Equipment	Event	Pos.	Notes
1992	Barcelona	Male Windsurfer	Lechner	23	
1996	Savannah	Male Windsurfer	Mistral	7	
2000	Sydney	Male Windsurfer	Mistral	18	
2004	Athens	Male Windsurfer	Mistral	6	
2008	Qingdoa	Male Windsurfer	RS:X	11	
2012	Portland	Male Windsurfer	RS:X	14	
2016	Rio	Male Windsurfer	RS:X	11	

Olympic Games
Preceded by Telma Monteiro	Flagbearer for Portugal; Rio de Janeiro 2016	Succeeded by Incumbent
