= Piotr Myszka =

Polish windsurfer

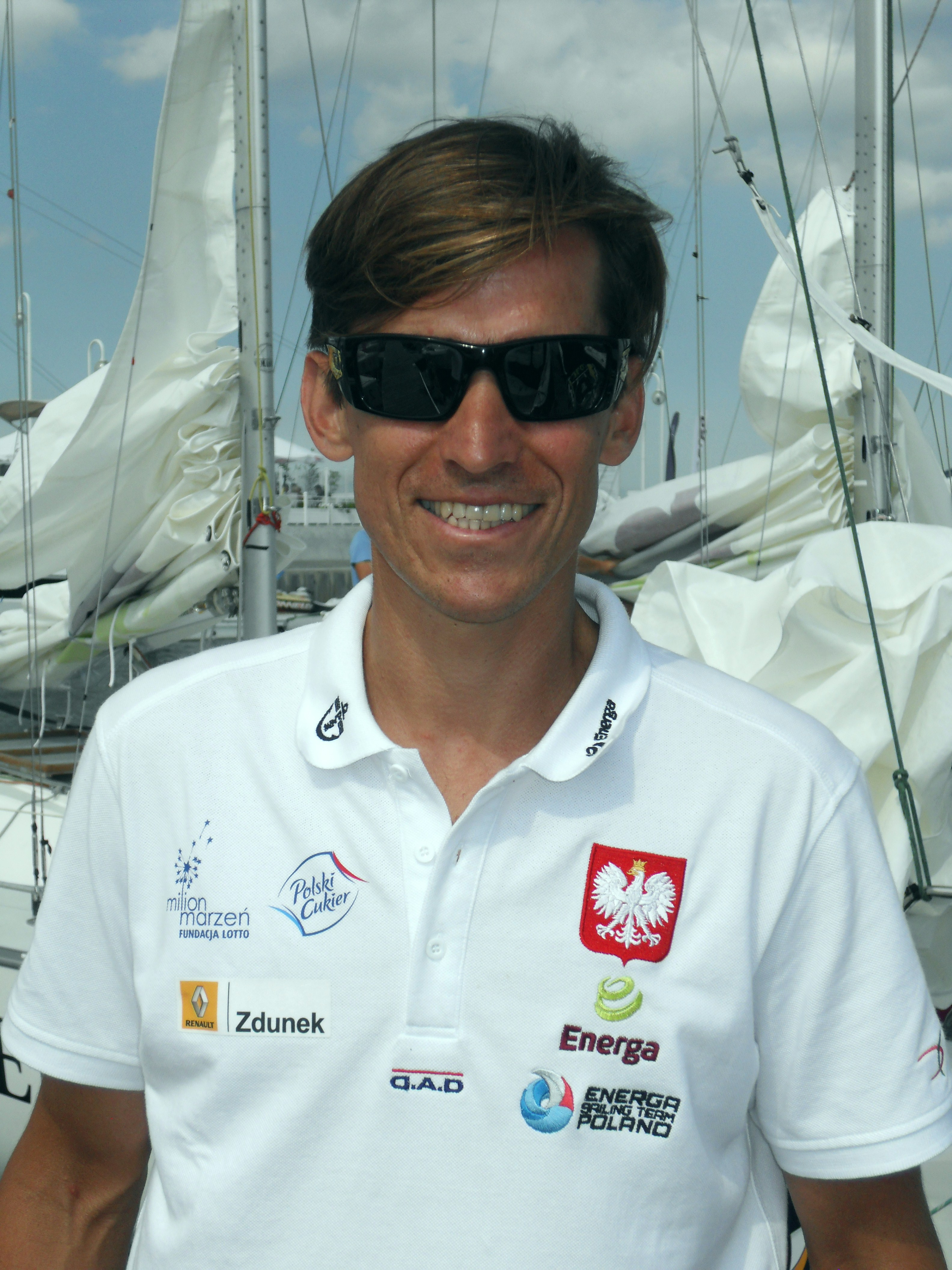
- Piotr Myszka

Personal information
- Nationality: Polish
- Born: July 25, 1981 (age 44) Mrągowo, Poland

Sailing career
- Country: Poland
- Sport: Sailing
- Event: Windsurfing
Medal record
Men's Windsurfing
Representing Poland
Windsurfing World Championships
Gold medal – first place	2010 Kerteminde	RS:X
Gold medal – first place	2016 Eilat	RS:X
Silver medal – second place	2011 Perth	RS:X

Piotr Myszka (born 25 July 1981) is a Polish windsurfer. He won the gold medal at the 2010 RS:X Windsurfing World Championships and at the 2016 RS:X Windsurfing World Championships.
