= Penny Way =

British windsurfer (born 1962)

Personal information
- Born: 3 April 1962 (age 62); Bristol, England
- Children: Emma Wilson

Sport
- Sport: Windsurfing

Achievements and titles
- Olympic finals: 1992, 1996
- World finals: 1986, 1990, 1991

Helen E. "Penny" Wilson (née Way; born 3 April 1962) is a British former windsurfer, who won multiple Windsurfing World Championships events. She competed at the 1992 Summer Olympics coming 6th and the 1996 Summer Olympics coming 7th.

== Career ==
Way's first competitive sailing event was in 1976 in Pagham, West Sussex. In total, she won 14 national championships in the United Kingdom and Australia, and was a European champion.

In 1982, Way competed in and won the British men's qualification event for the 1984 Summer Olympics. She was unable to qualify for the Olympics as the Games only held men's windsurfing at the time. She won the 1984 European Windsurfing Championships in Guernsey. Way won the 1986 Windsurfing World Championships, becoming the first English woman to do so. She attended the 1988 Summer Olympics as a spectator. In the 1990 season, she only lost one event, and won the World Championships again. She won five of the six races at the World Championships. In 1991, she won her third World Championships, and also came sixth at an event in Singapore despite suffering from flu whilst travelling to the event.

Way competed at the 1992 Summer Olympics, the first time that women's windsurfing had been an event at the Games. She was selected for the Olympics without needing to attend the British qualification event, and was considered a medal contender. At the Games, she finished 6th. Way won the British qualification event for the 1996 Summer Olympics. The event was finished after 10 of the scheduled 12 races as Way had won the event with two races to spare. At the Games, she finished 7th. Way retired from windsurfing in 1996.

== Personal life ==
Way was born in Bristol, England; her birth name was Helen Way, but her brother called her Henny-Penny. She grew up in Cornwall, later lived in Nottingham, and now lives in Christchurch, Dorset, where a road is named after her. She married Rob Andrews, a Royal Yachting Association coach. She later competed at the 1996 Summer Olympics under the surname Wilson.

Way's daughter Emma Wilson is a sailor who won a bronze medal in the RS:X event at the 2020 Summer Olympics in Tokyo, Japan, and won another bronze medal in the IQFoil event at the 2024 Olympics. Her son Dan is also a sailor.
