= Amit Inbar =

Israeli windsurfer

Amit Inbar עמית ענבר
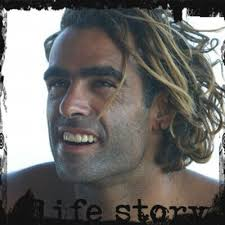

Personal information
- Born: 9 August 1972 (age 53) Mikhmoret, Israel
- Height: 183 cm (6 ft 0 in)
- Weight: 77 kg (170 lb)

Sailing career
- Sport: Sailing
- Class(es): Mistral, Lechner, Raceboard

Amit Inbar (Hebrew: עמית ענבר; born 9 August 1972) is an Israeli Olympic competitive windsurfer, and a kitesurfer.

Inbar was born in the small town of Mikhmoret, in the Central District of Israel, close to the sea, and is Jewish. When Inbar competed in the Olympics, he was 6 feet 0 inches (183 cm) tall, and weighed 170 pounds (77 kg).

== Surfing and kitesurfing career ==
Inbar received his first surfboard as a present from his parents when he turned seven years old, and began to windsurf because his brother Eran, a top windsurfer, needed competition. He won the Israeli national championship seven times during his career.

In 1991, Inbar became World No. 1, and won the silver medal in the board windsurfing World Championship.

Inbar competed for Israel at the 1992 Summer Olympics in Barcelona, Spain, at the age of 19 in Sailing - Men's Windsurfer, and came in 8th.

In 1993, Inbar won the gold medal at the European Championship. In 1994, Inbar came in fifth in the World Championship.

in 1997, he won the silver medal in the World Championship. In 1998, Inbar won the gold medal at the 1998 European Championships, and came in second in the mistral at the World Championships.

In 2000, Inbar won the 2000 South American Championships, won the silver medal at the 2000 European Championships, and came in fourth at the 2000 World Championships.

Inbar competed for Israel at the 2000 Summer Olympics in Sydney, Australia, at the age of 28 in Sailing - Men's Windsurfer, and came in 7th.

In 2001, Inbar was ranked as high as No. 11 in the world in surfing, but turned his attention to kitesurfing.

Inbar now runs a surfing school. He mentored Israeli windsurfer Nimrod Mashiah from a young age.
