= Jorunn Horgen =

Norwegian windsurfer

Personal information
- Born: 6 December 1966 (age 59) Krokstadelva, Norway

Sport
- Sport: Windsurfing
- Club: Eikeren Brettseilerklubb

Jorunn Horgen (born 6 December 1966) is a Norwegian windsurfer. She was born in Hokksund. She participated at the 1992 Summer Olympics, where she placed 8th, and at the 1996 Summer Olympics, where she placed fifth. She is the world champion from 1984, 1986, 1987, 1989 and 1992.
