= Jorge García (windsurfer) =

Argentine windsurfer (born 1962)

Personal information
- Full name: Jorge Rubén García Velazco
- Nationality: Argentine
- Born: 29 October 1968 (age 58)
- Height: 174 cm (5 ft 9 in)
- Weight: 68 kg (150 lb)

Sport
- Sport: Windsurfing
Medal record
Men's sailing
Representing Argentina
Pan American Games
Silver medal – second place	1987 Lake Michigan	Sailboard

Jorge Rubén García Velazco (Note: In this Spanish name, the first or paternal surname is García and the second or maternal family name is Velazco.) (born 29 October 1968) is an Argentine windsurfer. He competed at the 1984 Summer Olympics and the 1988 Summer Olympics.
