= Maud Herbert =

French windsurfer

Medal record

Women's windsurfing

Representing France

Windsurfing World Championships
Gold medal – first place	1991 San Francisco	Lechner A390
Gold medal – first place	1992 Cadix	Lechner A390
Gold medal – first place	1995 Gimli	Mistral
Gold medal – first place	1995 Port Elizabeth	Mistral
Gold medal – first place	1996 Haifa	Mistral
Bronze medal – third place	1993 Kashiwazaki	Mistral

Maud Herbert (born 13 March 1974) is a French windsurfer. She was 4th in the sailboard (Lechner) class at the 1992 Summer Olympics.

She is one of the Women multiple medallist at the Windsurfing World Championships.
