= Andrea Zinali =

Italian windsurfer

Personal information
- Nationality: Italian
- Born: 3 September 1969 (age 56) Piombino, Italy
- Height: 170 cm (5 ft 7 in)
- Weight: 71 kg (157 lb)

Sailing career
- Sport: Sailing
- Club: Centro Velico Piombinese
- Class(es): Mistral, Formula 18

Andrea Zinali (born 3 September 1969) is an Italian windsurfer. He competed in the men's Mistral One Design event at the 1996 Summer Olympics.
