= Lanee Butler =

American windsurfer (born 1970)

Personal information
- Full name: Lanee Butler-Beashel
- Nickname: Carrie
- Born: June 3, 1970 (age 56) Manhasset, New York, U.S.
- Height: 164 cm (5 ft 5 in)
- Weight: 56 kg (123 lb)

Sailing career
- Sport: Sailing
- Classes: Mistral, Lechner
Medal record
Sailing
Representing United States
Pan American Games
Gold medal – first place	1991 Havana	Women's Lechner
Bronze medal – third place	1995 Mar Del Plata	Women's Lechner
Gold medal – first place	1999 Winnipeg	Women's Mistral
Gold medal – first place	2003 Santo Domingo	Women's Mistral

Lanee "Carrie" Butler-Beashel (born June 3, 1970, in Manhasset, New York) is an American windsurfer. She competed at four Olympics from 1992 to 2004. Her best position was fourth in 2000.

Year	Place	Event	Class
World Championships
2004	16	Sailing at the 2004 Summer Olympics – Women's Mistral One Design	Mistral Women
2000	4	Sailing at the 2000 Summer Olympics – Women's Mistral One Design	Mistral Women
1996	11	Sailing at the 1996 Summer Olympics – Women's Mistral One Design	Mistral Women
1992	5	Sailing at the 1992 Summer Olympics – Women's Lechner A-390	Lechner Women
World Championships
2023	1	IWCA World Championships - Windsurfer Class	Women
2004	31	Mistral World Championship (Olympic Qualifier)	Mistral
2003	25	2003 ISAF Sailing World Championships	Mistral
1999	33	IMCO Mistral World Championships	Mistral
1998	17	IMCO Mistral World Championships	Mistral
1997	15	IMCO Mistral World Championships	Mistral
1996	12	IMCO Mistral World Championships	Mistral
1995	13	IMCO Mistral World Championships	Mistral
1994	5	IYRU World BOARDSAILING Championships	Mistral
1993	2	IMCO Mistral World Championships	Mistral
1990	3	Womens Lechner World Championship	Lechner
1991	9	IYRU Women's Sailing World Championships	Lechner
1990	2	IYRU World Women's Sailing Championships	Lechner
1988	4	17th 1987 IYRU Youth Sailing World Championships (Girls)	Mistral
1986	24	16th 1986 IYRU Youth Sailing World Championships (Open)	Mistral

She is married to America's Cup sailor Adam Beashel. Her brother in law is six-time Olympian Colin Beashel. She and Adam have two sons, born in 2005 and 2008.
