= Blanca Manchón =

Spanish windsurfer (born 1987)

Personal information
- Full name: Blanca María Manchón Domínguez
- Born: 6 March 1987 (age 39) Seville, Spain
- Height: 163 cm (5 ft 4 in)

Sailing career
- Sport: Sailing
- Class: RS:X
Medal record
Women's sailing
Representing Spain
Mediterranean Games
| Gold medal – first place | 2018 Tarragona | RS:X |

Blanca María Manchón Domínguez (born 6 March 1987 in Seville) is a Spanish windsurfer. She won the gold medal at the 2010 RS:X Windsurfing World Championships.

Manchón announced her pregnancy in 2016, which resulted in her main sponsor dropping her. Seven months after giving birth, Blanca was proclaimed Champion of the Windsurfing World in the Raceboard Class. Manchón continued to sail with large support from her family and friends and most particularly, her son Noah.

In an interview with the Spanish newspaper Marca, Blanca criticised "the concept held that a sporting woman who becomes pregnant at age 29 is never again going to do anything, as if her career were finished.”

She came back to competition. On one of her last tweets, she says: "8th in the World Cup The Chinese take the medals but I take that if you want YOU CAN! Super happy!!"
