= Lise Vidal =

French windsurfer (1977–2021)

Personal information
- Nationality: French
- Born: 24 November 1977 Marseille, Bouches-du-Rhône, France
- Died: 3 July 2021 (aged 43) Saint-Clément-des-Baleines, Ré Island, Charente-Maritime, France
- Height: 1.74 m (5 ft 9 in)
- Weight: 58 kg (128 lb)

Sport

Sailing career
- Class: Mistral One Design
- Club: Yacht Club Pointe Rouge

Lise Vidal (24 November 1977 – 3 July 2021) was a French windsurfer. She competed in the 2000 Summer Olympics, finishing ninth in the Women's Mistral One Design event.

She died of a cerebral hemorrhage at the age of 43.
