= Amelie Lux =

German windsurfer (born 1977)

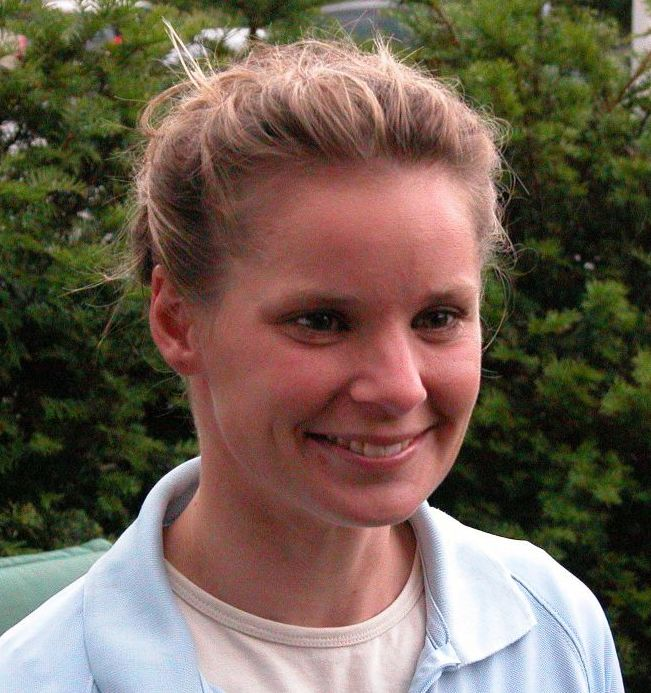
- Lux in 2004

Medal record

Sailing

Representing Germany

Olympic Games
Silver medal – second place	2000 Sydney	Mistral

Amelie Lux (born 5 April 1977) is a German windsurfer. She won a silver medal in the sailboard (Mistral) class at the 2000 Summer Olympics.
