= Franck David =

French windsurfer (born 1970)

Personal information
- Full name: Franck Olivier Christian François David
- Born: 21 March 1970 (age 56) Paris, France

Sailing career
- Sport: Sailing
- Class(es): Lechner, Mistral
Medal record
Men's sailing
Representing France
Olympic Games
Gold medal – first place	1992 Barcelona	Lechner sailboard

Franck David (born 21 March 1970 in Paris) is a French windsurfer who competed in the 1992 Summer Olympics in Barcelona, where he won the gold medal in the Men's Lechner Sailboard Class. He also became World champion in 1992.
