= Natasha Sturges =

Australian windsurfer

Natasha Sturges (born 30 June 1975) is an Australian-born windsurfer who competed in the 1996 Summer Olympics and the 2004 Summer Olympics.

Born in Sydney, Sturges represented Australia in the women's Mistral event and finished in ninth place in 1996. In 2004 she represented Great Britain in the same event and again finished ninth.

== Links ==
- Natasha Sturges at the Australian Olympic Committee
- Natasha Sturges at Olympedia
- Natasha Sturges at InterSportStats
