= Barbara Kendall =

New Zealand windsurfer

Barbara Kendall CNZM MBE OLY
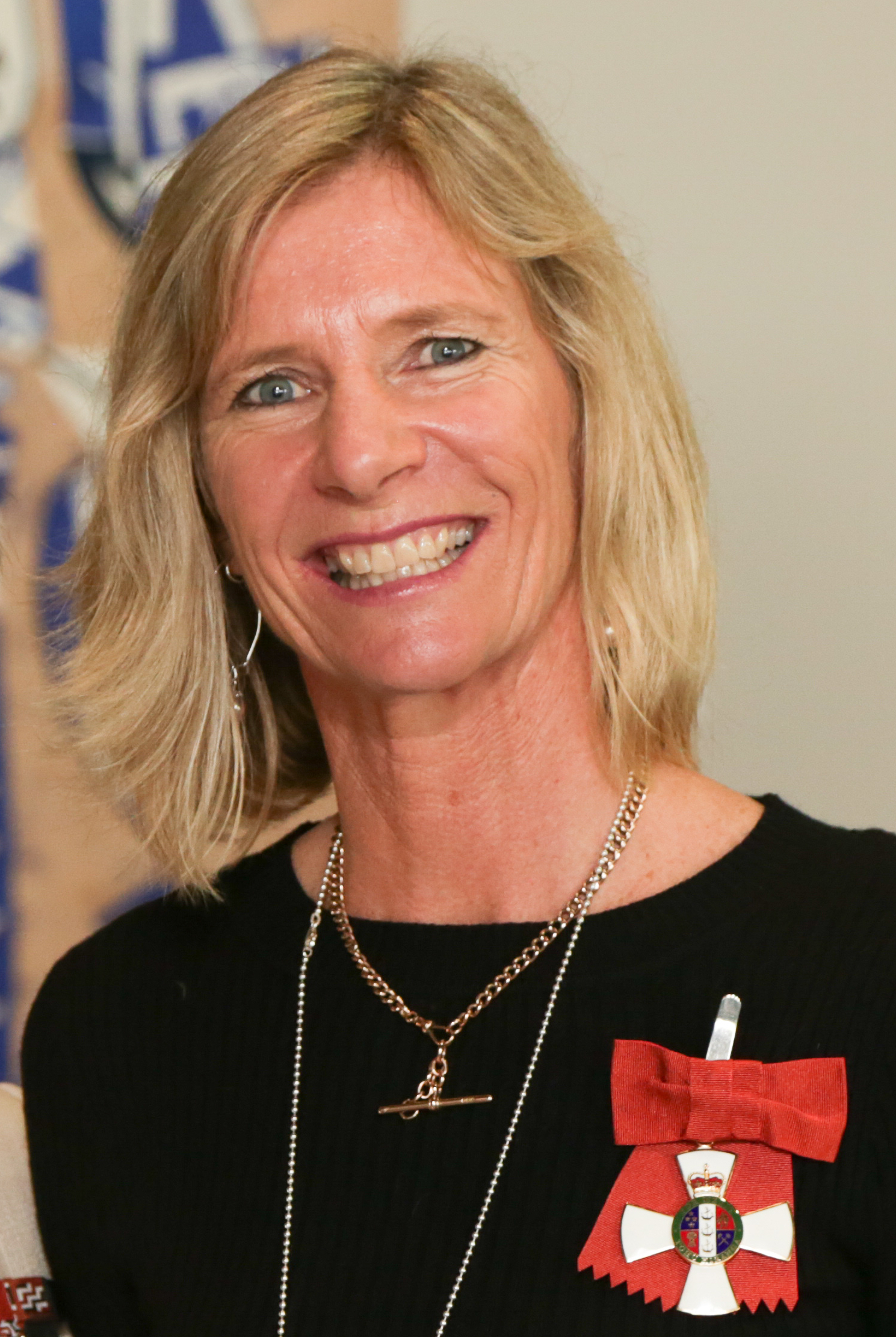
- Kendall in 2019

Personal information
- Born: Barbara Anne Kendall; 30 August 1967 (age 58) Papakura, New Zealand
- Relative: Bruce Kendall (brother)
Medal record
Women's sailing
Representing New Zealand
Olympic Games
Gold medal – first place	1992 Barcelona	Sailboard (Lechner)
Silver medal – second place	1996 Atlanta	Sailboard
Bronze medal – third place	2000 Sydney	Sailboard

Barbara Anne Kendall CNZM MBE (born 30 August 1967) is a former boardsailor from New Zealand. She competed at five Summer Olympic Games and won gold, silver and bronze medals.

== Biography ==
Kendall was born in Papakura on 30 August 1967, the daughter of Tony and Peggy Kendall. She was raised in the Auckland suburb of Bucklands Beach and attended Macleans College. She won a gold medal at the 1992 Summer Olympics in Barcelona, silver medal in 1996 (in Atlanta, Georgia), and a bronze medal in 2000 (in Sydney). Kendall finished 5th at the 2004 Games in Athens and sixth at the 2008 Games in Beijing. She was the first, and as of 2008. (She has since been joined by Valerie Adams, Tokyo 2021. Luuka Jones has stated her intention to compete in her fifth Olympics in Paris 2024 to join them.)

During 1998, she had founded Gulf Harbour School on the coast of Auckland. In 2008, she returned and created a mural for the school.

Kendall was the Oceania athletes' representative on the International Olympic Committee from 2005 to 2008, having replaced Susie O'Neill who resigned in 2005 (Kendall was the athlete from the same continent who had received the next highest number of votes for the commission), and was on the New Zealand Olympic Committee Athletes Commission until 2008. In July 2011, she was elected as a member of the International Olympic Committee and the IOC Athletes' Commission and sat on the Women and Sport Commission and Sport and the Environment Commission until August 2016.

Kendall's brother Bruce is also an Olympic Gold medallist. They are the first brother and sister to have achieved this feat for New Zealand.

Kendall officially retired from competitive board sailing in May 2010.

== Honours and awards ==
In 1990, Kendall was awarded the New Zealand 1990 Commemoration Medal. In the 1993 New Year Honours, she was appointed a Member of the Order of the British Empire, for services to boardsailing. In the 2019 New Year Honours, she was made a Companion of the New Zealand Order of Merit, for services to sport.

== See also ==
- Women multiple medallist at the Windsurfing World Championships

Awards and achievements
Preceded by Marnie McGuire	New Zealand's Sportswoman of the Year; 1996; 1998, 1999; 2002	Succeeded by Beatrice Faumuina
Preceded by Beatrice Faumuina	New Zealand's Sportswoman of the Year; 1996; 1998, 1999; 2002	Succeeded by Leilani Joyce
Preceded by Melissa Moon	New Zealand's Sportswoman of the Year; 1996; 1998, 1999; 2002	Succeeded by Irene van Dyk
Preceded by Richie McCaw	Halberg Awards – Leadership Award; 2014	Succeeded by Brendon McCullum
Preceded by Monty Betham & Nerida Jantti	Dancing with the Stars (New Zealand) runner up Season 5 (2009 with Jonny Williams)	Succeeded by Chrystal Chenery & Jonny Williams
