= Bruce Kendall =

New Zealand sailor

Bruce Kendall MBE
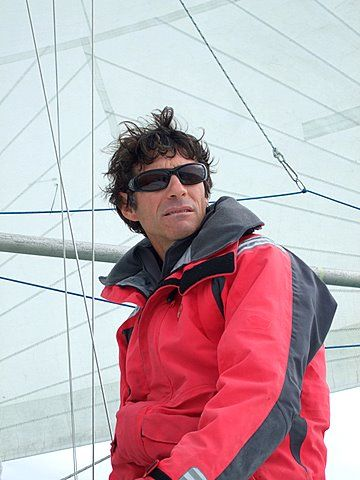
- Kendall in 2009

Personal information
- Born: Anthony Bruce Kendall; 27 June 1964 (age 62) Papakura, New Zealand
- Relative: Barbara Kendall (sister)

Sport
- Country: New Zealand
- Sport: Sailing
Medal record
Men's sailing
Representing New Zealand
Olympic Games
Gold medal – first place	1988 Seoul	Division II
Bronze medal – third place	1984 Los Angeles	Windglider

Anthony Bruce Kendall MBE (born 27 June 1964) is a two-time Olympic medallist in sailing for New Zealand.

He has served as an elected member of the Howick Local Board since 2019. He has been the Chair of the Howick Local Board since November 2025.

== Yachting ==
Kendall's family are sailors. One week after his birth, and every weekend and holiday, he was on the family cruising yacht. At 7 years old, he began sailing in the family tender. At 13 years old he started racing P-class and Starlings before progressing to crewing for Mike Drumond https://en.wikipedia.org/wiki/Mike_Drummond 470 and keelboats. When he was 14 he turned to windsurfing.

== Olympics ==
Competing in boardsailing, Kendall's first medal was a bronze at the 1984 Summer Olympics in Los Angeles. At the 1988 Summer Olympics in Seoul, he improved to win the gold medal with a race to spare. Kendall also competed at the following Olympics in Barcelona, just failing to win another medal due to faulty equipment. The fin on his Lechner board, which were supplied by the Olympic regatta organisers in those days, snapped in the third race.

At the 1996 Summer Olympics in Atlanta, Kendall was a sailing coach for the New Zealand team. Kendall attempted to qualify for the 2008 Summer Olympics in Beijing in the Tornado class with fellow former Olympic boardsailing representative Aaron McIntosh, but they were unsuccessful.

Kendall is the older brother of Barbara Kendall, who is also an Olympic gold medallist. They are the only brother and sister to have achieved this feat for New Zealand.

In 2002 Kimberly Birkenfeld, on a windsurfer, collided with a Yachting New Zealand motorboat driven by Kendall about one nautical mile from the Olympic sailing venue in Athens, Greece. Birkenfeld hit the back left hand side of the motorboat, knocking her unconscious. Kendall then pulled Birkenfeld on board the motorboat and resuscitated her. In hospital, Birkenfeld remained unconscious for 30 days. She had suffered severe head and spinal injuries, and remained in hospital for two months. Since the accident Birkenfeld now has to rely on a wheelchair for travelling long distances, suffers shortness of breath, and struggles to speak.

In 2004 she filed a $15 million claim against Kendall and Yachting NZ. The High Court limited compensation payable to Birkenfeld to the extent of Yachting NZ's insurance cover of $500,000. A stay of proceedings was also issued by the High Court halting Birkenfeld's case. In 2008 Birkenfeld unsuccessfully challenged the High Court decision in the Court of Appeal. She then appealed her case to the Supreme Court. In August 2009 the Supreme Court rejected her appeal.

== Coaching ==
Grant Beck, Aaron Mcintosh and Kendall assisted Barbara Kendall to win her Olympic Gold in Barcelona. Kendall started coaching after loosing the 1996 Olympic Trials to Aaron McIntosh. At the 1996 Olympics In 2012 Kendall was the coach of the Hong Kong board sailing team.

== Political career ==
Kendall is active within local body politics in East Auckland. He first stood for the Howick Local Board in the 2016 Auckland local elections, but was unsuccessful. Kendall stood again in 2019 and was elected to the Board, representing the Pakuranga subdivision.

== Awards and honours ==
In the 1989 Queen's Birthday Honours, Kendall was appointed a Member of the Order of the British Empire, for services to boardsailing. He was inducted into the New Zealand Sports Hall of Fame in 2013.

Awards
Preceded by Paul MacDonald	Lonsdale Cup of the New Zealand Olympic Committee; 1988	Succeeded by Anthony Mosse
