= Robert Nagy (windsurfer) =

French windsurfer

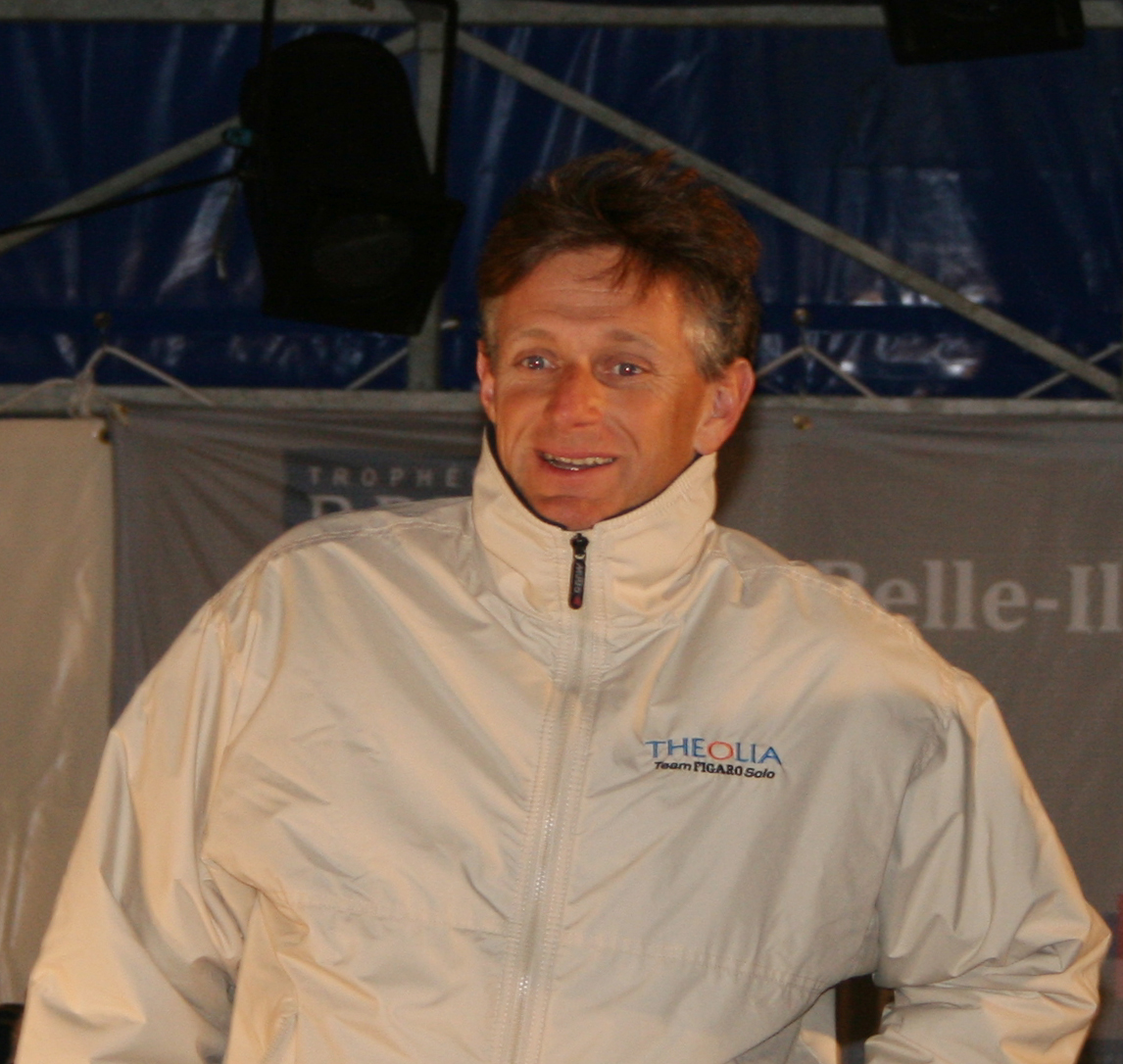
- Robert Nagy

Personal information
- Nationality: French
- Born: 27 March 1963 (age 62); Saint-Vallier, France

Sport
- Sport: Windsurfing

Robert Nagy (born 27 March 1963) is a French windsurfer. He competed in the Division II event at the 1988 Summer Olympics.
