= Nikolaos Kaklamanakis =

Greek windsurfer

Nikos Kaklamanakis
Personal information
- Full name: Nikolaos Kaklamanakis
- Born: 19 August 1968 (age 58) Athens, Greece

Achievements and titles
- Olympic finals: (gold) (1996), (silver) (2004)
- World finals: (gold) (1996, 2000, 2001), (silver) (1989, 1995, 2003)
- Regional finals: (gold) (1994), (silver) (1989, 2003), (bronze) (1993, 1995, 1998)
- Highest world ranking: 1st (Mistral, 1994)
Medal record
Men's sailing / windsurfing
Representing Greece
Olympic Games
Gold medal – first place	1996 Atlanta	Mistral
Silver medal – second place	2004 Athens	Mistral
Windsurfing World Championships
Gold medal – first place	1996 Haifa	Mistral
Gold medal – first place	2000 Mar del Plata	Mistral
Gold medal – first place	2001 Varkiza	Mistral
Silver medal – second place	1989 Palma de Mallorca	Lechner Division II
Silver medal – second place	1995 Port Elizabeth	Mistral
Silver medal – second place	2003 Cádiz	Mistral
European Championships
Gold medal – first place	1994 Heraklion	Mistral
Silver medal – second place	1989 Helsinki	Lechner Division II
Bronze medal – third place	1993 Nieuwpoort	Mistral
Bronze medal – third place	1995 Sandown	Mistral
Bronze medal – third place	1998 Marathon	Mistral
Mediterranean Games
Gold medal – first place	1993 Languedoc-Roussillon	Mistral

Nikolaos "Nikos" Kaklamanakis (Greek: Νικόλαος Κακλαμανάκης, born 19 August 1968, in Athens) is the Greek Gold-medal winner who lit the Olympic torch in the opening ceremony of the 2004 Summer Olympics in Athens. He was named one of the 1996 Greek Male Athletes of the Year.

Kaklamanakis participated in five consecutive Olympic Games from 1992 to 2008, reaching the medal race in all five of them. He won the gold medal at the 1996 Olympics in Atlanta and the silver medal at the 2004 Olympics in Athens, while he was ninth in Barcelona (1992), sixth in Sydney (2000) and eighth in Beijing (2008).

== Biography ==
One of the most popular athletes in Greece, Nikolaos Kaklamanakis is a three-time Mistral class windsurfing world champion and a gold medalist at the 1996 Summer Olympics in Sailing. He won silver in the event at the 2003 World Championships in Cádiz, Spain, behind Przemek Miarczynski of Poland. In the 2000 Summer Olympics he took the 6th place, while in the 2004 Summer Olympics in Athens, Kaklamanakis took the silver medal behind Gal Fridman of Israel. Four years later, in the 2008 Beijing Olympic Games he finished 8th in the RS:X Men Sailing Race.

Kaklamanakis faced legal action from the Hellenic Sailing Federation in 2019 for alleged defamation. The lawsuit stemmed from statements Kaklamanis made during a speech in the Hellenic Parliament, criticizing certain practices within the federation. In 2022, the court acquitted Kaklamanis, ruling that there was no intent to defame.

== Selected achievements ==
Medal	Event	Year
Silver	World Championship (Lechner Division II)	1989
Silver	European Championship (Lechner Division II)	1989
Gold	Athens EUROLYMP	1992
Bronze	European Championship (Mistral)	1993
Gold	Athens EUROLYMP	1993
Gold	European Championship (Mistral)	1994
Bronze	European Championship (Mistral)	1995
Silver	IMCO World Championship	1995
Gold	Australasian Championship (Mistral)	1995
Gold	IMCO World Championship	1996
Gold	Atlanta Olympics	1996
Bronze	European Championship (Mistral)	1998
Gold	Athens EUROLYMP	1998
Gold	Mistral World Championship	2000
Bronze	International ASA Windsurfing Championship	2001
Gold	Mistral World Championship	2001
Silver	ISAF World Championship	2003
Silver	Athens Olympics	2004

Olympic Games
Preceded by 1980 USA Men's Ice Hockey Team	Final Olympic torchbearer Athens 2004	Succeeded by Stefania Belmondo
Preceded by Cathy Freeman	Final Summer Olympic torchbearer Athens 2004	Succeeded by Li Ning
Preceded by Pyrros Dimas	Flagbearer for Greece; Sydney 2000	Succeeded by Pyrros Dimas
