= Francesco Wirz =

Italian windsurfer (born 1967)

Personal information
- Nationality: Italian
- Born: 19 November 1967 (age 58) Bergamo, Italy
- Height: 180 cm (5 ft 11 in)
- Weight: 67 kg (148 lb)

Sport
- Sport: Windsurfing

Francesco Wirz (born 19 November 1967) is an Italian windsurfer. He competed in the Division II event at the 1988 Summer Olympics.
