= Faustine Merret =

French windsurfer

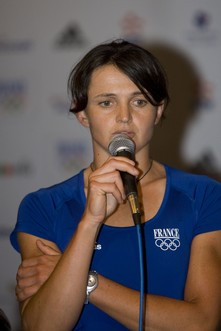
- Merret in 2008

Medal record

Women's sailing

Representing France

Olympic Games
Gold medal – first place	2004 Athens	Sailboard

Faustine Lucie Merret (born 13 March 1978 in Brest) is a French windsurfer, who became Olympic champion at the 2004 Summer Olympics in the windsurfing class. She also has won several medals at World and European championships in the mistral and RS:X windsurfing classes.

== Achievements ==
Year	Position	Windsurfing class	Event
2006		RS:X – Women's Windsurfer	(Italy) 2006 RS:X World Championships
2006		RS:X – Women's Windsurfer	(China) Qingdao International Regatta
2006		RS:X – Women's Windsurfer	(Netherlands) Holland Regatta
2004		Mistral – Women	(Greece) 2004 Summer Olympics
2004		Mistral – Women	(Poland) 2004 Mistral European Championships
2004		Mistral – Women	(Netherlands) Spa Regatta
2004		Mistral – Women	(Turkey) 2004 Mistral World Championships
2004		Mistral – Women	(Greece) Athens Eurolymp Week
2004		Mistral – Women	(Australia) Sail Melbourne
2003		Mistral – Women	(Spain) 2003 Mistral World Championships
2003		Mistral – Women	(Italy) 2003 Mistral European Championships
2003		Mistral – Women	(Spain) XXXIV Princess Sofia Trophy
2002		Mistral – Women	(Thailand) 2002 Mistral World Championships
2002		Mistral – Women	(Spain) XXXIII Princess Sofia Trophy
2001		Mistral – Women	(Greece) 2001 Mistral World Championships
2001		Mistral – Women	(Spain) XXXII Princess Sofia Trophy
2000		Mistral – Women	(Spain) 2000 Mistral European Championships
2000		Mistral – Women	Championnat de France Voile Olympique
2000		Mistral – Women	(Argentina) 2000 Mistral World Championships
1999		Mistral – Women	(Australia) Sydney International Regatta
1999		Mistral – Women	(France) 1999 Mistral World Championships
1999		Mistral – Women	(Australia) Sydney Harbour Regatta
1999		Mistral – Women	(Poland) 1999 Mistral European Championships
1999		Mistral – Women	(Germany) Kiel Week
1999		Mistral – Women	Championnat de France Voile Olympique
1999		Mistral – Women	(France) Semaine Olympique Marseille
1998		Mistral – Women	(Australia) Sydney International Regatta
1998		Mistral – Women	(France) 1998 Mistral World Championships
1998		Mistral – Women	(Australia) Sydney Olympic Test Event
1998		Mistral – Women	Championnat de France
1998		Mistral – Women	(France) Semaine Olympique Française
1998		Mistral – Women	(Australia) Sail Sydney
1998		Mistral – Women	(Italy) Roma Sail Week Anzio
1997		Mistral – Women	(Spain) 1997 Mistral European Championships
1997		Mistral – Women	(France) Semaine Olympique Française
1996		Mistral – Women	(Spain) 1996 Mistral World Junior Championships
