= Riccardo Giordano =

Italian windsurfer (born 1970)

Personal information
- Nationality: Italian
- Born: 14 March 1970 (age 55); Palermo, Italy

Sport
- Sport: Windsurfing

Riccardo Giordano (born 14 March 1970) is an Italian windsurfer. He competed at the 1992 Summer Olympics, the 2000 Summer Olympics, and the 2004 Summer Olympics.
