= Ted Huang =

Taiwanese American windsurfer and cyclist

Personal information
- Full name: Wei Theodore Huang
- Nationality: Taiwanese
- Born: 4 July 1970 (age 55)

Sport
- Sport: Windsurfing
Medal record
Men's sailing
Representing Chinese Taipei
Asian Games
Silver medal – second place	1998 Bangkok	Mistral light

Wei Theodore "Ted" Huang (born 4 July 1970) is a Taiwanese windsurfer. He competed at the 1996 Summer Olympics and the 2000 Summer Olympics.
