= Mike Gebhardt =

American windsurfer

Michael Gebhardt
Personal information
- Full name: Michael William Gebhardt
- Nicknames: "Mike", "Gebi"
- Born: November 25, 1965 (age 60) Columbus, Ohio, U.S.

Sailing career
- Sport: Sailing
Medal record
Men's sailing
Representing the United States
Olympic Games
Silver medal – second place	1992 Barcelona	Lechner A-390
Bronze medal – third place	1988 Seoul	Lechner Division II
Pan American Games
Gold medal – first place	1987 Lake Michigan	Sailboard
Silver medal – second place	1995 Mar del Plata	Mistral
Bronze medal – third place	1999 Winnipeg	Mistral

Michael William "Gebi" Gebhardt (born November 25, 1965) is an Americal former professional windsurfer, who competed in five consecutive Summer Olympics, in the Olympic sailing discipline/event of windsurfing.

== Life and career ==
Gebhardt was born in Columbus, Ohio. In the summer of 1981, at the age of 15, he learned to windsurf in his back yard in Fort Walton Beach, Florida. Living on Okaloosa Islands waterfront, Gebi spent most of his adolescent days in the water; swimming, surfing, waterskiing, freediving, fishing and sailing Hobie beach cats and weekend cruising on his dad's 50 foot all wooden schooner sailboat, "The Pele". When Gebi's younger brother Jon sailed home on a windsurfer, Gebhardt knew he had found the perfect wind and wave powered sport to take his love of the ocean to the next level.

Gebi's Olympic Windsurfing career started in 1984, with the 17-year-old grom windsurfer finished 3rd in the 1984 L.A. US Olympic Trials. Only the winner, Scott Steele earned the right to represent the US in the first ever Olympic Windsurfing Medal Event, which was now part of Olympic yachting for the first time in Olympic history. Gebhardt was Scott Steele's- (1984 Olympic Windsurfing Silver medalist); training partner and was instrumental in Scott winning the US's first Olympic Windsurfing Medal. In Los Angeles, Stephan van den Berg of the Netherlands won the Gold Medal and Bruce Kendall of New Zealand won the Bronze Medal.

"Gebi" as he is known to friends, competed in the 1984 Olympic Exhibition Windsurfing Event, which ran alongside the first ever Olympic windsurfing medal event. Gebhardt finished 5th in the Olympic Exhibition event which showcased windsurfing's other disciplines, besides course racing; including slalom, long-distance racing and longboard freestyle on the original windsurfer brand board.

At the 1988 US Olympic Trials, Gebhardt won the right to represent the US in the 1988 Summer Olympics in Seoul, South Korea. In a very stormy high wind regatta, Gebhardt survived 45 knot puffs in the last race to win his first Olympic Medal, a Bronze. After the 1988 Olympics, Gebhardt turned Pro joiningh the PWA Tour(Professional Windsurfers Association) and competed in PWA World Cup events as a professional windsurfer worldwide. Gebhardt, a consummate tweaker of gear, also ran hundreds of tech talk clinics and wrote technical "How To" coaching articles for multiple Windsurfing magazines (educating the masses of poleboarders) when not testing/developed windsurfing gear for his sponsors and enjoyed helping to modernize the sports equipment through constant innovation.

In Gebhardt's third Olympics, the 1992 Barcelona Summer Olympics, winning the regatta going into the last race, Gebi ended up losing the Gold Medal by .4 of a point!!, to reigning World Champion Franck David of France, ultimately winning his second Olympic Medal, a Silver Medal. Gebi had to beat both the 1984 Olympic Gold Medalist, Stephan van Den Berg and 1988 Olympic Gold Medalist (and 1984 Olympic Bronze Medalist) Bruce Kendall to secure his second Olympic Medal.

Gebhardt competed in two more Olympics, the 1996 Atlanta Summer Olympics, finishing 6th, having two bad races is all it takes to not medal;as well as his last Olympic Games in Sydney, Australia's 2000 Summer Olympics, where he finished 11th and at the time being the oldest competitor at 34 in a physically grueling sport.

Gebhardt, one of the most decorated American windsurfers of all time, competed in over 310 competitions in over 60 countries worldwide, amassing a pile of bling; including 6 World Championship Titles, 23 National Championship Titles, Pan Am Games- Gold, Silver and Bronze Medals, scoring over 200 wins in regattas and contests in racing, slalom and freestyle and holds the World Record for kiting across from Ft. Lauderdale, Florida, to Bimini Island in the Bahamas covering over 60 mile of rough open ocean in 3.5 hours while kiteboarding with teammate Kent Marinkovich.

Olympic WIndsurfing legacy: Known for being one of the most technical coaches in Windsurfing and Kiting, Gebhardt's Olympic Windsurfing legacy includes developing, testing and overseeing the selection of the 2008 Olympic Windsurf Equipment and rig for World Sailing. The new kit called the "Windsurfing RSX" built by Neil Pryde, has been used in Olympic Windsurfing since the 2008 Summer Olympics. The Olympic RSX equipment was used from the 2008 Olympics up to its last appearance in the 2020 Tokyo Summer Olympics.

Olympic Windsurf Coaching: After retiring from his 5th Olympics in 2000, Gebi started his Olympic Windsurf coaching career, culminating in coaching Olympic Gold Medalist Gal Fridman, Israel's only Olympic Gold Medalist, at the 2004 Athens Olympics. Gebhardt has coached Olympic athletes from more than 25 countries.

Olympic Kiting legacy: Elite Kite coaching since 2005, Gebhardt was politically instrumental in bringing kitesurfing into the Olympic family, campaigning with the likes or Richard Branson and Bill Tai to entice the IOC (International Olympic Committee) into putting Kitesurfing into the Summer Olympic Games and Youth Olympic Games. Men's and women's Olympic Kite Racing will debut as a Summer Olympic Sailing Medal event in the 2024 Paris Summer Olympics, where kite foil racing will be the discipline, raced in Marseille, France. Coach Gebi, a pro level kiter himself, has mentored and coached dozens of aspiring pro and Olympic kitesurfers: including World Speed Record holder Robbie Douglas to multiple world championship titles in kitesurfing and breaking/holding Sailing's Outright World Speed Record.

In kite foilboard racing coach Gebhardt has coached World Champions Daniela Moroz and Nico Parlier, besides coaching 2 athletes at the 2018 Youth Olympic Games in Kitesurfing Twin Tip Racing- USA's Cameron Maramenides finished 4th and Antigua's Tiger Tyson who finished 5th. Gebhardt also prepared Youth Olympic Silver Medalist, the Philippines Christian Tio and also supported Dominican Republic's Youth Olympic Gold Medalist Deury Corniel.
