= Flavia Tartaglini =

Italian windsurfer

Personal information
- Nationality: Italian
- Born: 2 February 1985 (age 41)
- Height: 1.71 m (5 ft 7 in)
- Weight: 59 kg (130 lb)

Sailing career
- Sport: Sailing
Medal record
Women's sailing
Representing Italy
Mediterranean Games
Bronze medal – third place	2018 Tarragona	RS:X

Flavia Tartaglini (born 2 February 1985) is an Italian sailor. She represented her country at the 2016 Summer Olympics.

She is first cousin of the Italian international rugby union players Andrea and Matteo Pratichetti and granddaughter of the former rugby union international Silvano Tartaglini.
