= Aaron McIntosh =

New Zealand windsurfer (born 1972)

Personal information
- Born: 7 January 1972 (age 54) Auckland, New Zealand
Medal record
Men's sailing
Representing New Zealand
Olympic Games
| Bronze medal – third place | 2000 Sydney | Sailboard |

Aaron McIntosh (born 7 January 1972 in Auckland) is a windsurfer from New Zealand who won a bronze medal at 2000 in Sydney. McIntosh gre up in Buckland's Beach, where he purchased his first windsurfer at the age of 16. He was educated at Macleans College. McIntosh just missed out on a medal at the 1996 Summer Olympics in Atlanta finishing a close fourth. At the World Mistral Championships he finished third in 1993, second in 1995 and won three times in 1994, 1997 and 1998.

McIntosh attempted to qualify for a third Olympics at Beijing in the Soling class but was unsuccessful. He did qualify—with Mark Kennedy—for the two-man Tornado multihull class, but New Zealand did not send them to the games.

He is the coach of Dorian van Rijsselberghe, who won gold at the 2012 and 2016 Olympics, as well as Kiran Badloe who won gold at the 2020 Olympics.
