= Sailing at the 1996 Summer Olympics =

Sailing at the Games of the XXVI Olympiad
- Venues: Savannah
- Dates: First race: 22 July 1996; Last race: 2 August 1996
- Competitors: 458 from 78 nations
- Boats: 312

Sailing/Yachting is an Olympic sport starting from the Games of the 1st Olympiad (1896 Olympics in Athens, Greece). With the exception of 1904 and possibly the canceled 1916 Summer Olympics, sailing has always been included on the Olympic schedule. The Sailing program of 1996 consisted of a total of ten sailing classes (disciplines). For each class, with the exception of the Soling, eleven races were scheduled from 22 July to 2 August 1996 off the coast of Savannah at the Wassaw Sound (an area of the Atlantic Ocean). For the Soling ten fleetraces were scheduled followed by a series of matchraces for the top 6 boats of the fleetrace result.

== Venue ==
Day Marina
- Interactive map of Day Marina
- Coordinates: 31°56′01″N 80°56′59″W

According to the IOC statutes the contests in all sport disciplines must be held either in, or as close as possible to the city which the IOC has chosen. An exception was made for the Olympic yachting events, which customarily must be staged on the open sea. On account of this principle, the city of Savannah was chosen for the organization of the sailing events. Savannah is 400 kilometers from Atlanta, a four-hour drive in the same state via two major highways (Interstates 75 and 16). Spectators were given the opportunity to board boats that will sail out to the courses to provide a close look at the competition. About 1000 spectators per day made use of the opportunity.

The sailing events were held off the coast of Savannah at the Wassaw Sound and the Atlantic Ocean. The venue used three locations:

- Satellite Olympic Village in Savannah
- Olympic marina on Wilmington Island. The Stars and Solings, were towed between the Olympic marina and their race areas.
- Day marina, a temporary barge system (14,000 m^{2}) near the north side of Wassaw Sound at the mouth of the Wilmington River. The day marina was used as a forward launch area for the dinghies and windsurf boards.

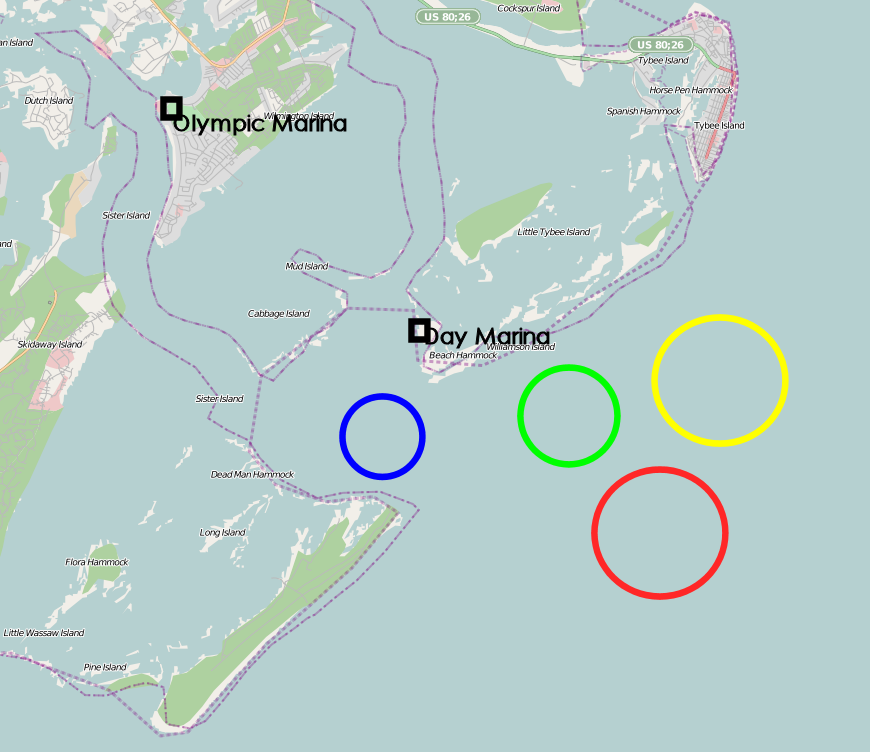
Black = Marinas Blue = Alpha course Green = Bravo course Yellow = Charly course Red = Delta course

Separate course areas were used for the following pairs of classes:

- Mistral one-design (men and women)
- Europe and Laser
- Finn and Star
- 470 (men and women)
- Tornado and Soling (fleetracing)
- Soling (matchracing)

== Competition ==
=== Overview ===
Continents	Countries	Classes	Boats	Male	Female
6	78	10	312	358	100

=== Continents ===
- Africa
- Asia
- Oceania
- Europe
- Americas

=== Countries ===
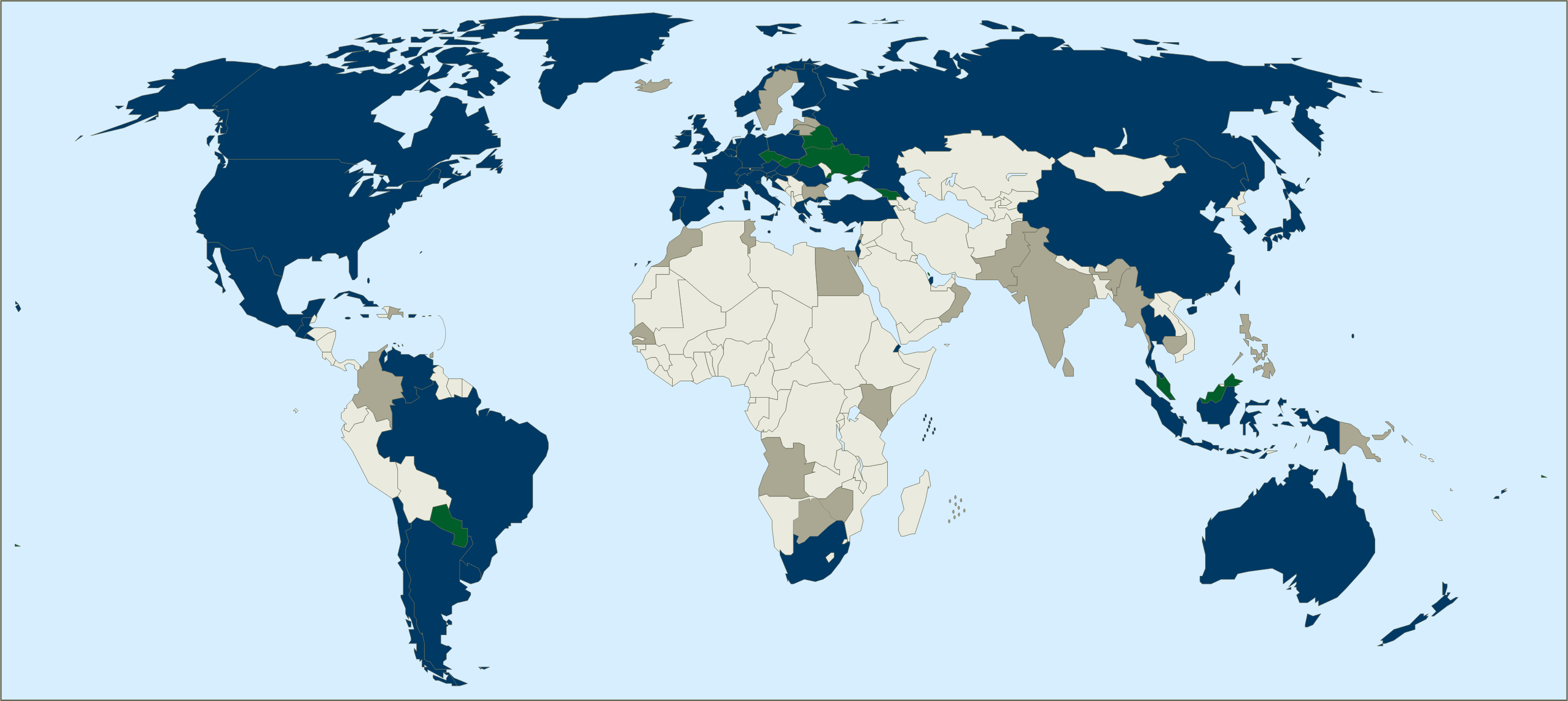
Countries that participated in the Sailing event of the 1996 Olympic Games. Blue: Water Gray: Never participated in OG Dark Gray: Participated in earlier OG Green: Country participated for the first time Dark Blue: Country participated also on previous games Red: Country boycotted the sailing event of the OG

Netherlands Antilles	Andorra	Antigua and Barbuda
Argentina	American Samoa	Australia
Austria	Bahamas	Barbados
Belgium	Bermuda	Belarus
Brazil	Bahrain	Canada
Cayman Islands	Chile	China
Cook Islands	Croatia	Cuba
Cyprus	Czech Republic	Denmark
Djibouti	Ecuador	Spain
Estonia	Fiji	Finland
France	Great Britain	Georgia
Germany	Greece	Guatemala
Guam	Hong Kong	Hungary
Indonesia	Ireland	Israel
Virgin Islands	Italy	British Virgin Islands
Jamaica	Japan	South Korea
Latvia	Saint Lucia	Malaysia
Mexico	Malta	Netherlands
Norway	New Zealand	Paraguay
Poland	Portugal	Puerto Rico
Qatar	Romania	South Africa
Russia	Seychelles	Singapore
Slovenia	San Marino	Switzerland
Slovakia	Sweden	Thailand
Chinese Taipei	Turkey	Ukraine
Uruguay	United States	Venezuela

=== Classes (equipment) ===
Class	Type	Event	Sailors	Trapeze	Mainsail	Jibb/Genoa	Spinnaker	First OG	Olympics so far
Mistral One Design Class	Surfboard		1	0	+	–	–	1996	1
Mistral One Design Class	Surfboard		1	0	+	–	–	1996	1
Europe	Dinghy		1	0	+	–	–	1992	2
Laser	Dinghy		1	0	+	–	–	1996	1
Finn	Dinghy		1	0	+	–	–	1952	12
470	Dinghy		2	1	+	+	+	1988	3
470	Dinghy		2	1	+	+	+	1976	6
Tornado	Multihull		2	1	+	+	–	1976	6
Star	Keelboat		2	0	+	+	–	1932	14
Soling	Keelboat		3	0	+	+	+	1972	7

1996 Olympic Classes designs

== Medal summary ==
=== Women's events ===
Games	Gold	Silver	Bronze
1996: Women's Mistral One Design	Hong Kong (HKG); Lee Lai-shan	New Zealand (NZL); Barbara Kendall	Italy (ITA); Alessandra Sensini
1996: Europe	Denmark (DEN); Kristine Roug	Netherlands (NED); Margriet Matthijsse	United States (USA); Courtenay Becker-Dey
1996: Women's 470	Spain (ESP); Theresa Zabell; Begoña Vía Dufresne	Japan (JPN); Yumiko Shige; Alicia Kinoshita	Ukraine (UKR); Ruslana Taran; Olena Pakholchik

=== Men's events ===
Games	Gold	Silver	Bronze
1996: Men's Mistral One Design	Greece (GRE); Nikolaos Kaklamanakis	Argentina (ARG); Carlos Espinola	Israel (ISR); Gal Fridman
1996: Finn	Poland (POL); Mateusz Kusznierewicz	Belgium (BEL); Sébastien Godefroid	Netherlands (NED); Roy Heiner
1996: Men's 470	Ukraine (UKR); Yevhen Braslavets; Ihor Matviyenko	Great Britain (GBR); John Merricks; Ian Walker	Portugal (POR); Victor Rocha; Nuno Barreto

=== Open events ===
Games	Gold	Silver	Bronze
1996: Laser	Brazil (BRA); Robert Scheidt	Great Britain (GBR); Ben Ainslie	Norway (NOR); Peer Moberg
1996: Tornado	Spain (ESP); Fernando León; José Luis Ballester	Australia (AUS); Mitch Booth; Andrew Landenberger	Brazil (BRA); Lars Grael; Henrique Pellicano
1996: Star	Brazil (BRA); Torben Grael; Marcelo Ferreira	Sweden (SWE); Hans Wallén; Bobby Lohse	Australia (AUS); Colin Beashel; David Giles
1996: Soling	Germany (GER); Jochen Schümann; Thomas Flach; Bernd Jäkel	Russia (RUS); Georgy Shayduko; Dmitri Shabanov; Igor Skalin	United States (USA); Jeff Madrigali; Jim Barton; Kent Massey

== Medal table ==
Rank	Nation	Gold	Silver	Bronze	Total
1	Brazil	2	0	1	3
2	Spain	2	0	0	2
3	Ukraine	1	0	1	2
4	Denmark	1	0	0	1
4	Germany	1	0	0	1
4	Greece	1	0	0	1
4	Hong Kong	1	0	0	1
4	Poland	1	0	0	1
9	Great Britain	0	2	0	2
10	Australia	0	1	1	2
10	Netherlands	0	1	1	2
12	Argentina	0	1	0	1
12	Belgium	0	1	0	1
12	Japan	0	1	0	1
12	New Zealand	0	1	0	1
12	Russia	0	1	0	1
12	Sweden	0	1	0	1
18	United States	0	0	2	2
19	Israel	0	0	1	1
19	Italy	0	0	1	1
19	Norway	0	0	1	1
19	Portugal	0	0	1	1
Totals (22 entries)		10	10	10	30

== Remarks ==
=== Wildcards ===
After the qualification was finished the following sailors were granted a wildcard:

- Algeria – Mistral One Design Men, (No show)
- Guatemala – Mistral One Design Men, Cristian Ruata (45th)
- Indonesia – Mistral One Design Men, I Gusti Made Oka Sulaksana (13th)
- Thailand – Mistral One Design Men, Arun Homraruen (21st)
- Guam – Laser, Brett Chivers, (44th)
- San Marino – Laser, Luca Belluzzi (56th)
- Sudan – Laser, (No show)
- Cuba – 470 Men, Pedro Fernández & Angel Alfredo Jimenez (26th)
- Sudan – 470 Men, (No show)

=== Incidents ===
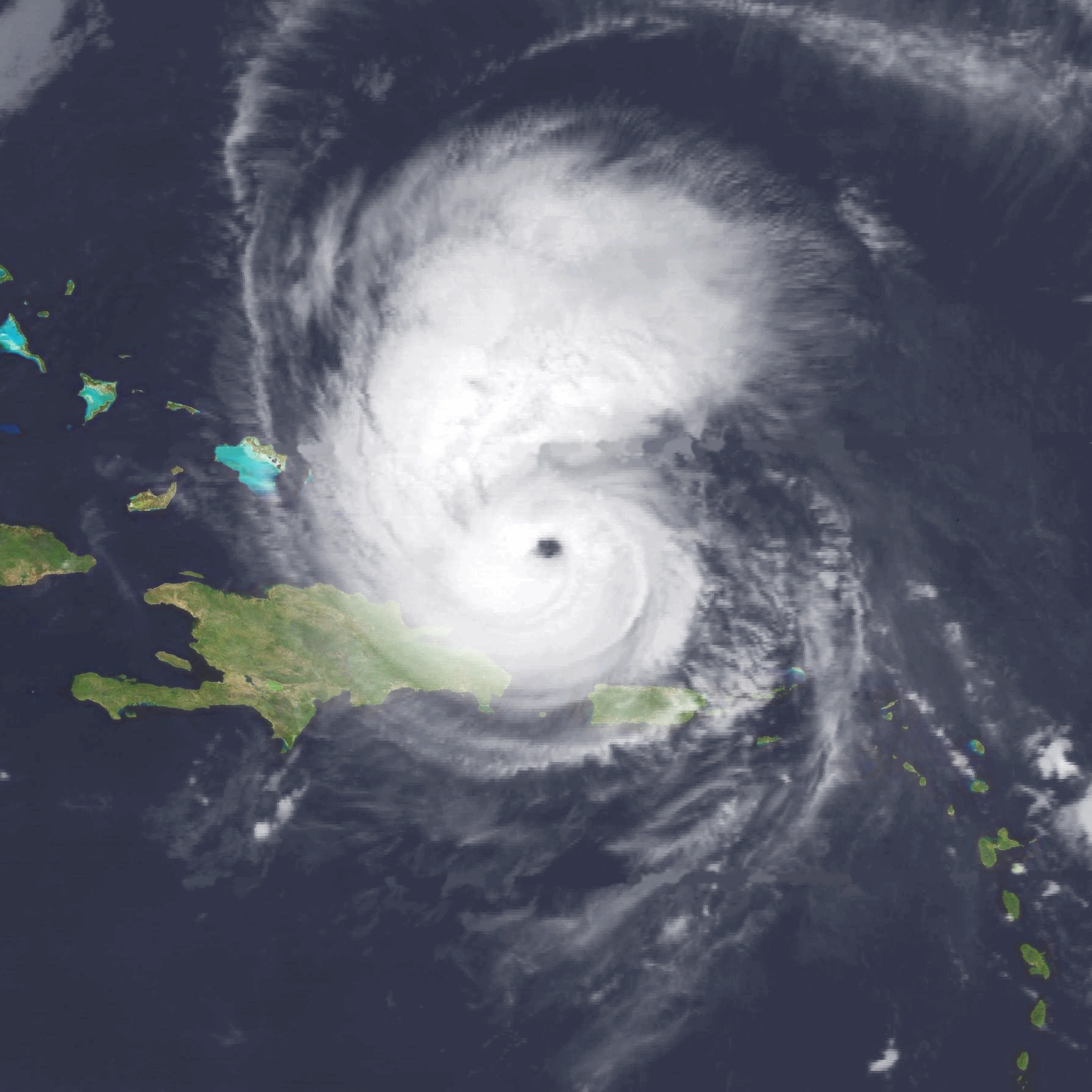
Hurricane Bertha

- The Olympic sailing facility at Savannah was before the opening of the Olympic Games (10 July) within the Hurricane Bertha warning area. Tornados, Stars and Solings were moved to the Sheraton facility. The Day Marina and the Sheraton were evacuated; the evacuation was complete by 6 PM.

=== Weather conditions ===
The winds on a typical day in Savannah begin is as follows:

- In the morning a light breeze from the west to the Northwest at about 5 knots
- The winds diminish in the late mornings
- By midday, the sea breeze circulation begins. When the sea breeze does rise, the winds backs to the south and Southeast
- Wind speed in the afternoon average between 7 and 12 knots

Olympic weather reports were provided by the National Weather Service from the locations Atlanta and Savannah. Doppler weather radar was used from Charleston, South Carolina. From Jacksonville, Florida the weather above the offshore courses was observed.

=== Sailors ===
During the Sailing regattas at the 1996 Summer Olympics among others the following persons were competing in the various classes:

Sailors at the 1996 Olympic Games
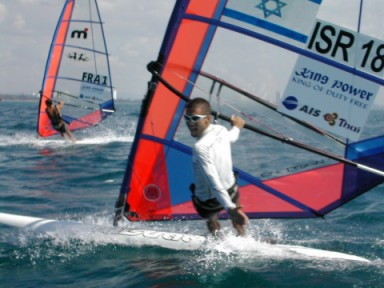
(bronze)
Israel
Gal Fridman

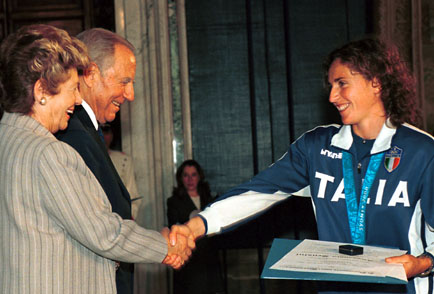
(bronze)
Italy
Alessandra Sensini

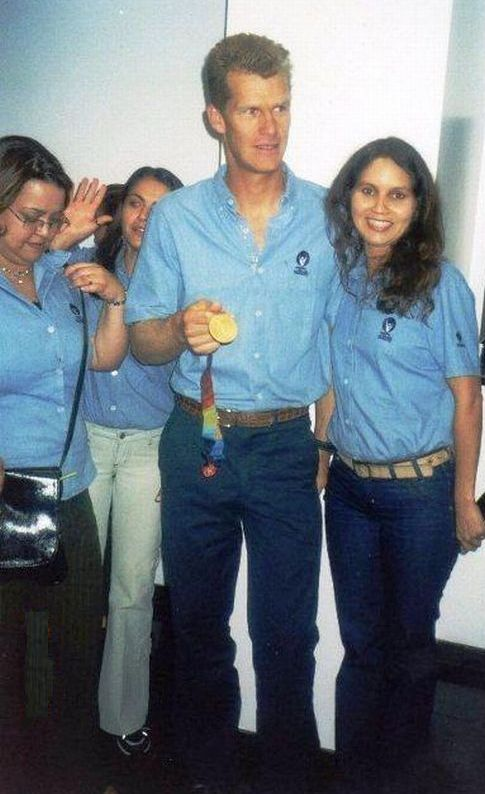
(gold)
Brazil
Robert Scheidt

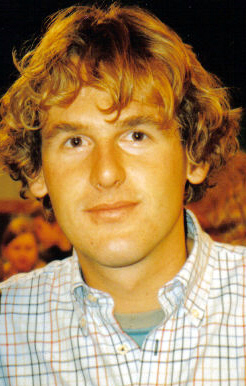
(gold)
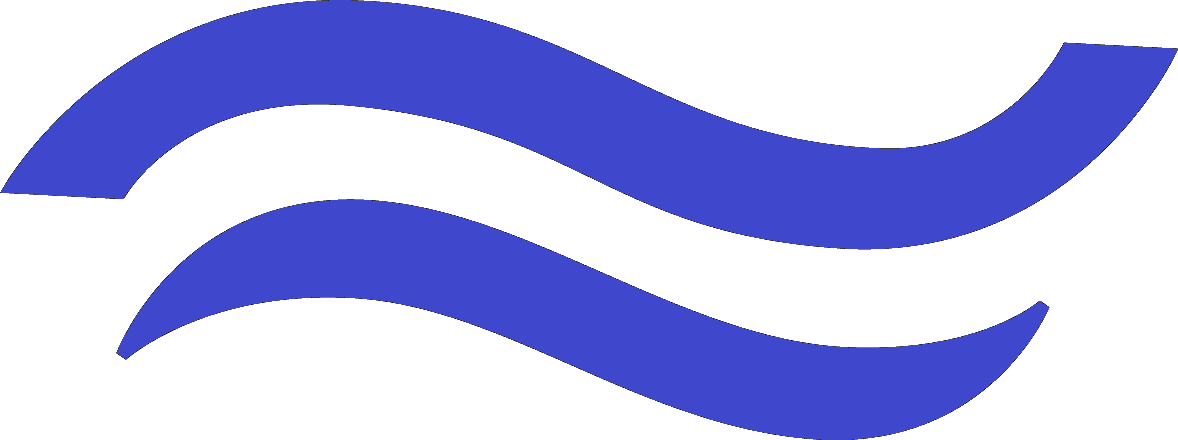
Poland
Mateusz Kusznierewicz

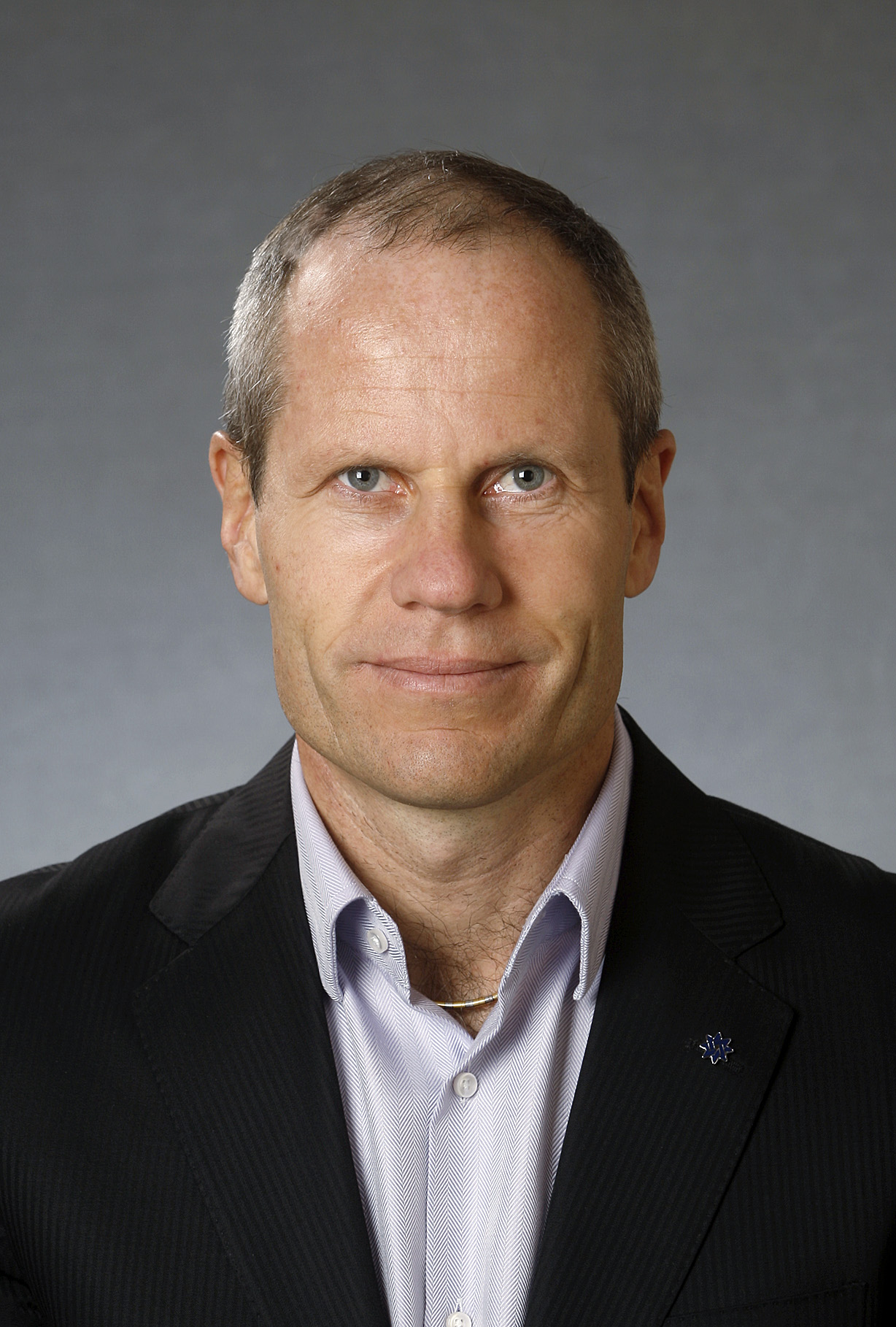
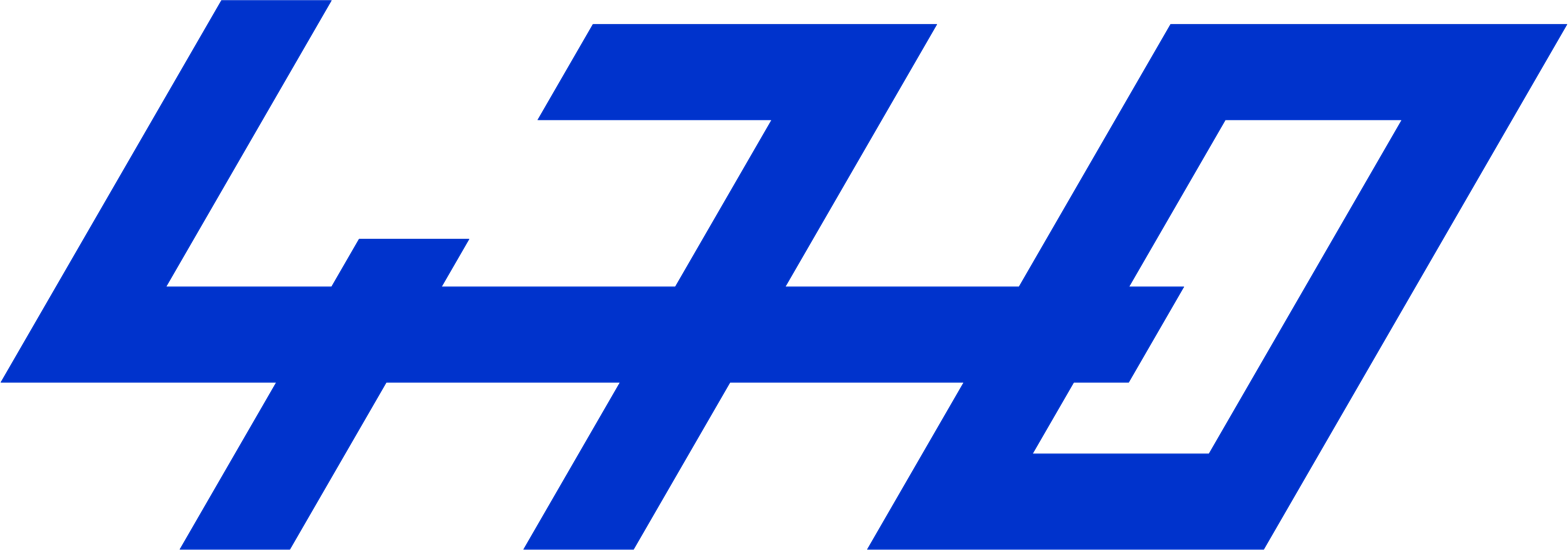
Estonia
Toomas Tõniste

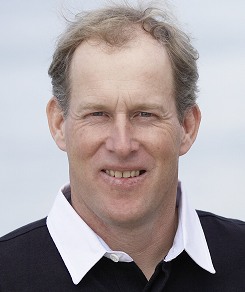
Germany
Roland Gäbler

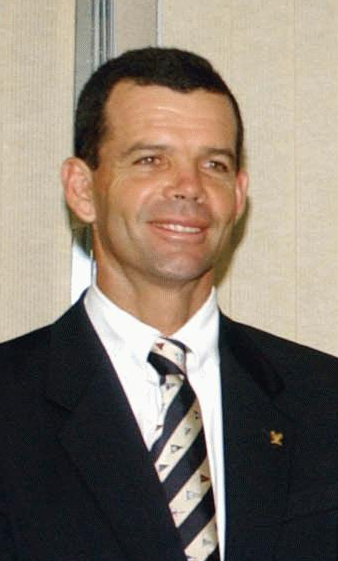
(gold)
Brazil
Torben Grael

Spain
Luis Doreste
