= Lars Kleppich =

Australian windsurfer

Personal information
- Full name: Lars Detlef Kleppich
- Born: 9 August 1967 (age 58) Sydney, New South Wales
- Height: 174 cm (5 ft 9 in)
- Weight: 69 kg (152 lb)

Sport
- Club: Dobroyd Sailing Club
Medal record
Men's sailing
Representing Australia
Olympic Games
Bronze medal – third place	1992 Barcelona	Lechner Sailboard

Lars Detlef Kleppich (born 9 August 1967 in Sydney, New South Wales) is a windsurfer from Australia, who competed in three Summer Olympics for his native country, starting in 1992. He won the bronze medal in the Men's Lechner Sailboard Class in Barcelona, Spain (1992). In 2023 he was the overall champion at the Windsurfer Class Worlds Championships held in Perth, Western Australia. He was an Australian Institute of Sport scholarship holder.
