= Sport in Israel =

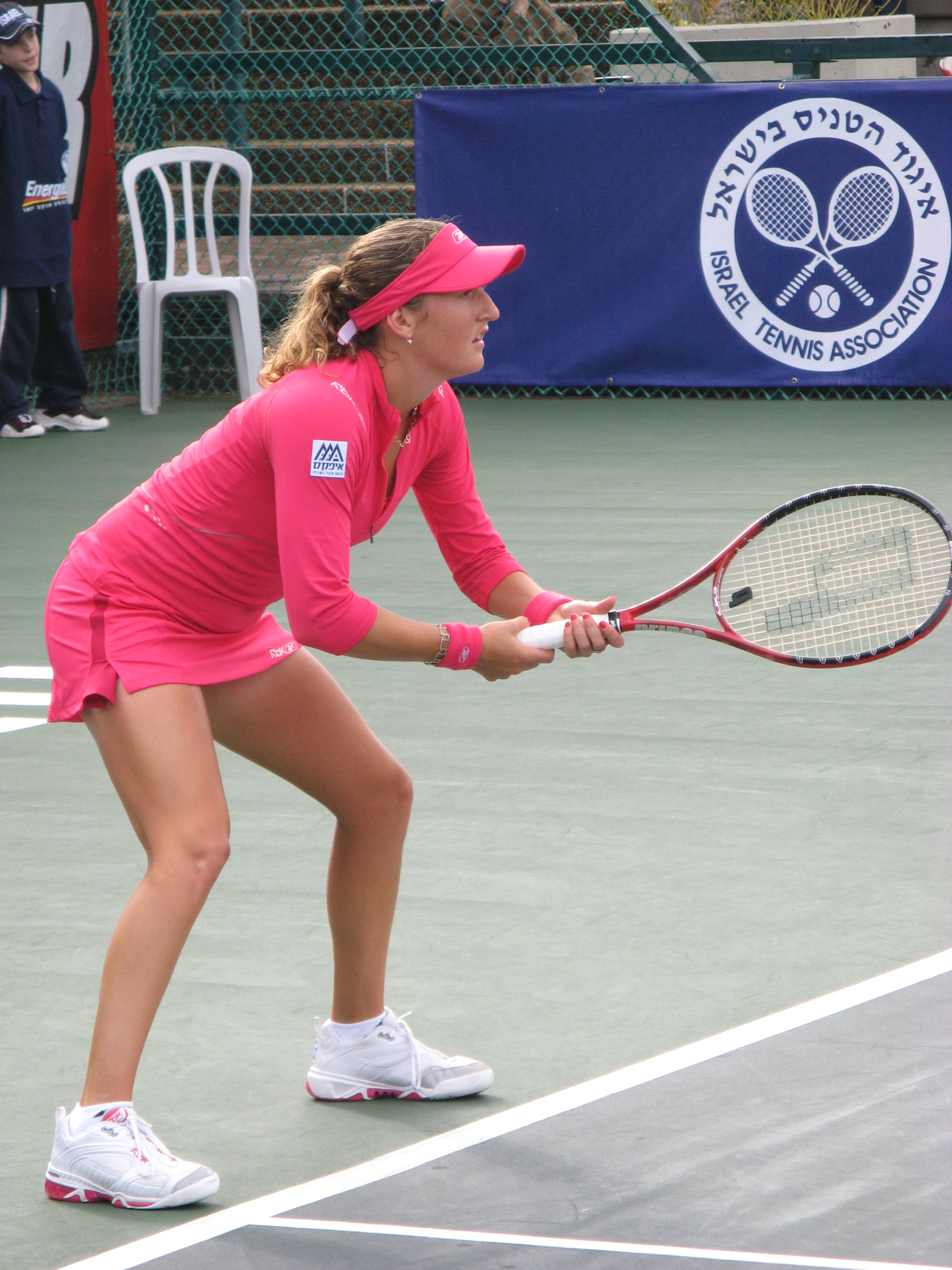
Shahar Pe'er, winner of Israeli tennis championship, 2008

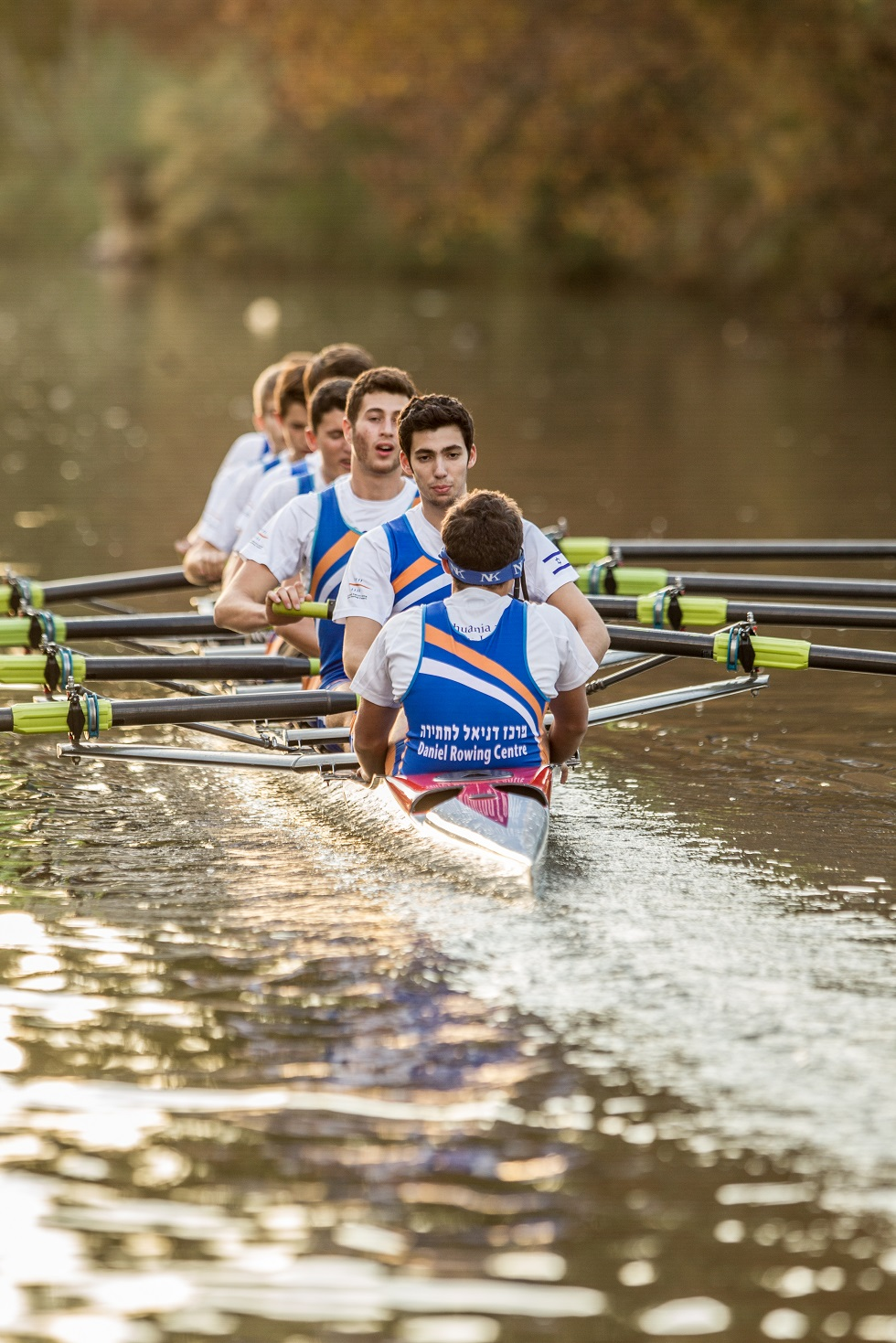
Juniors rowing at the Daniel Rowing Centre

Sport in Israel plays an important role in Israeli culture and is supported by the Ministry of Culture and Sport. The most popular sports in Israel have traditionally been Association football (mainly) and basketball (secondly) – with the first being considered the national sport – in both of which Israeli professional teams have been competitive internationally. Israel is an international center for Jewish sport around the world and since 1932, the Maccabiah Games, an Olympic-style event for Jewish athletes, is held in the country. Despite Israel's location in the Asian continent, the Israeli sports associations in various sports belong to the European associations, due to the refusal of many Arab Asian countries to compete with Israeli athletes.

The government's support and budgeting of sports in Israel is relatively low in comparison to other western countries. However, many Israeli athletes and teams managed to gain international success. The Israel national basketball team has won 2 gold medals in the Asian Games and 1 silver medal at the European Championship, and basketball club Maccabi Tel Aviv is considered one of the best teams in Europe with 6 European titles. The Israel national football team has won the AFC Asian Cup and the Israel Davis Cup team reached the semifinal of the 2009 Davis Cup. At the Olympic Games, Israel has won 20 medals.

== History ==
Jewish physical fitness was promoted in the 19th century by Max Nordau and his concept of Muscular Judaism. The Maccabiah Games, an Olympic-style event for Jewish athletes inaugurated in 1932 is held every fours years.

In 1964, Israel hosted and won the AFC Asian Cup. In 1970, the Israel national football team qualified for the FIFA World Cup, which was considered a major achievement for Israeli football. Israel was excluded from the 1978 Asian Games due to Arab pressure.

== Major sports ==
=== Football ===
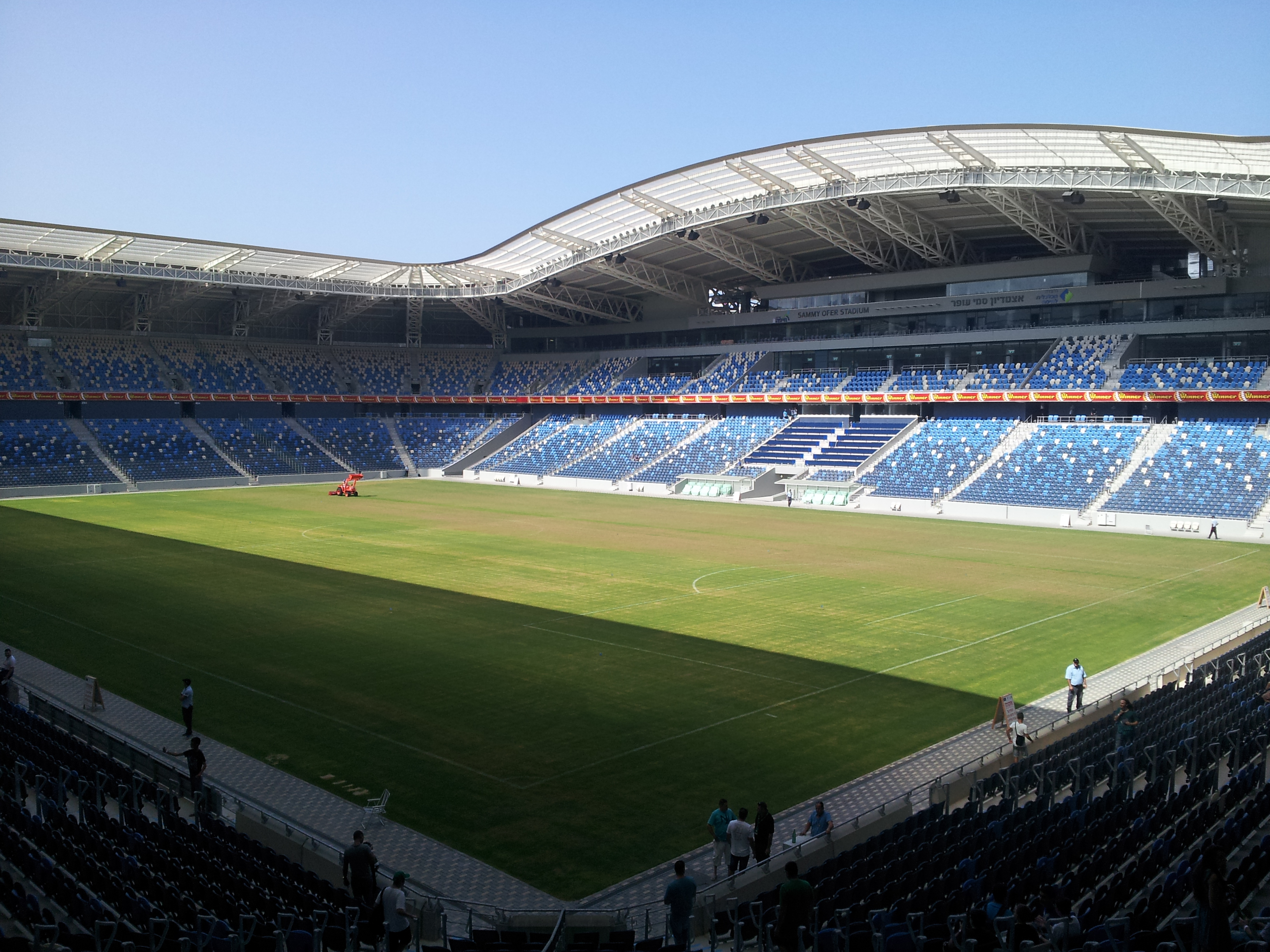
Sammy Ofer Stadium of Haifa, home of Maccabi Haifa, Hapoel Haifa, and the Israel national team

Football (Hebrew: כדורגל, Kaduregel) is the most popular sport in Israel. The sport is governed by Israel Football Association. It joined the Asian Football Confederation in 1954, but was expelled in 1974 due to political pressure from Arab and Muslim members in the context of the Arab–Israeli conflict. It was admitted to UEFA as an associate member in 1992 and as a full member in 1994, therefore their teams compete as part of Europe in all international competitions.

The matches that draw the largest crowds are those of the Israeli Premier League. In 1967, Hapoel Tel Aviv became the first club to win the Asian Club Championships. In the 2001–02 UEFA Cup Hapoel reached the quarter-finals after knocking out Chelsea, Lokomotiv Moscow and Parma.

Israeli teams were also qualified five times to the UEFA Champions League group stage, including Maccabi Haifa in the 2002–03 and 2009–10 seasons, Maccabi Tel Aviv in the 2004–05 and 2015–16 seasons and Hapoel Tel Aviv in the 2010–11 season.

The Israel national football team hosted and won the 1964 AFC Asian Cup and qualified for the 1970 FIFA World Cup, which was held in Mexico. Mordechai Spiegler scored in a 1–1 draw against Sweden. Israel's Olympic football team qualified for the 1968 Summer Olympics and the 1976 Summer Olympics both times reaching the quarter-finals. Israel's highest FIFA ranking was 15th in November 2008.

Famous matches of the Israeli football team include the 3–2 win in France in the 1994 world championship qualifying games, which ended up disqualifying the French team from the championship in the United States, the defeat of Austria 5–0 in 1999 during Euro 2000 qualifications, and a 2–1 win over Argentina in a friendly match in 1998, a game played in Teddy Stadium in Jerusalem.

Successful Israeli players who also played outside Israel include Eli Ohana, Giora Spiegel, Ronny Rosenthal, Avi Cohen, Eyal Berkovich, Haim Revivo, Dudu Aouate and Yossi Benayoun.

Notable Israeli players have included:

- Dudu Aouate, Israel, goalkeeper (RCD Mallorca & national team)
- Tal Ben Haim, Israel, center back/right back (Chelsea, Manchester City & national team captain)
- Yossi Benayoun, Israel, attacking midfielder (Chelsea, Liverpool, West Ham & national team captain)
- Eyal Berkovic, Israel, midfielder (West Ham, Celtic F.C., Manchester City national team)
- Avi Cohen, Israel, defender (Liverpool, Rangers, Maccabi Tel Aviv & national team)
- Yaniv Katan, Israel, forward/winger (Maccabi Haifa & national team)
- Eli Ohana, Israel, won UEFA Cup Winners' Cup and Bravo Award (most outstanding young player in Europe); national team; manager
- Haim Revivo, Israel, attacking/side midfielder (Celta Vigo, Fenerbahçe & national team)
- Ronnie Rosenthal, Israel, left winger/striker (Liverpool, Tottenham & national team)
- Giora Spiegel, Israel, midfielder (Israel national team)
- Mordechai Spiegler, Soviet Union/Israel, striker (Israel national team), manager
- Yochanan Vollach, Israel, defender (Maccabi Haifa & Israel national team)

=== Basketball ===
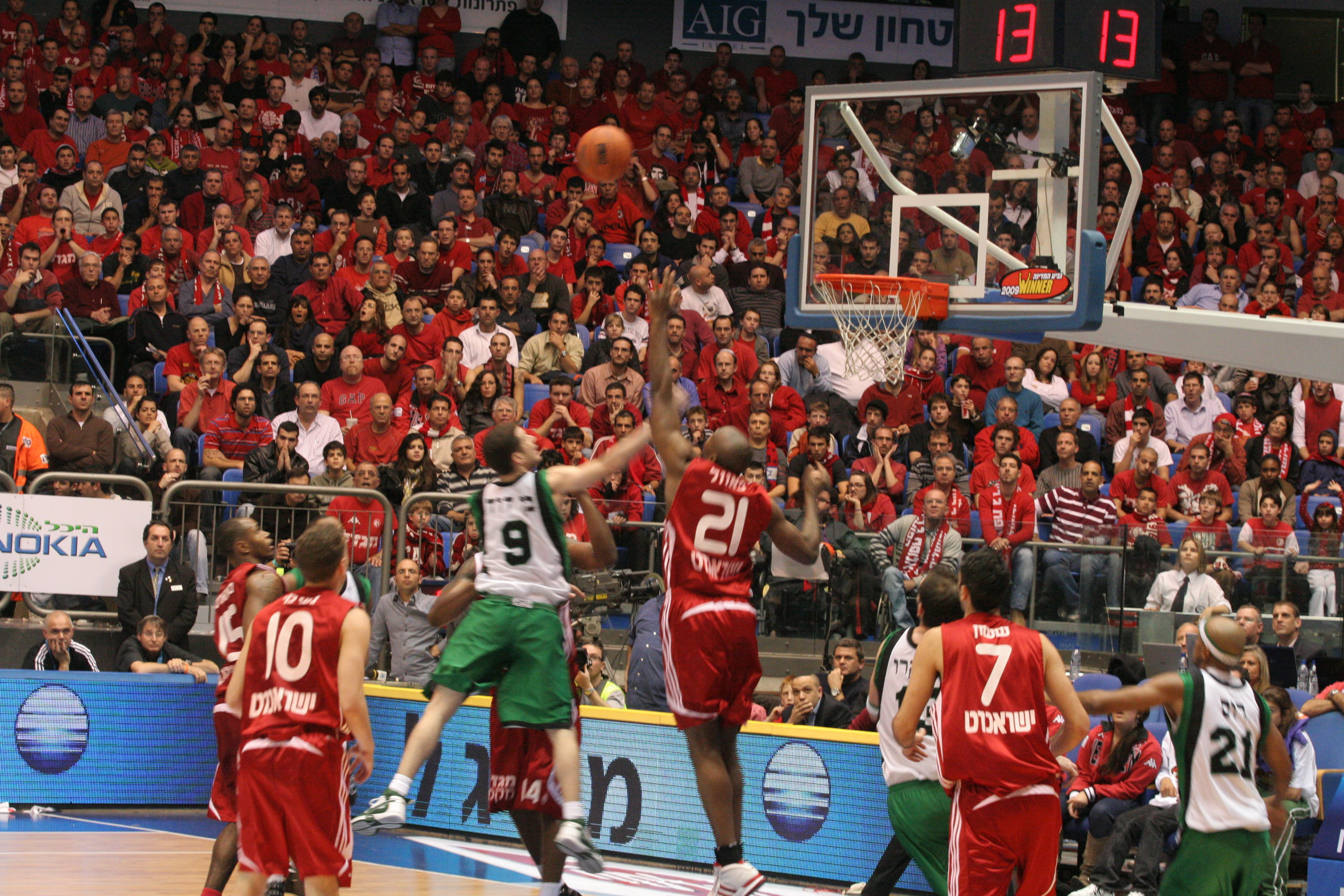
Hapoel Jerusalem

Basketball (כדורסל, Kadursal) is the second most popular sport in Israel. Hapoel Jerusalem, Hapoel Tel Aviv and Maccabi Tel Aviv dominate the domestic league and are among the top teams in Europe. Maccabi Tel Aviv has won the European championship 6 times, in 1977, 1981, 2001, 2004, 2005 and 2014. Hapoel Jerusalem won the Eurocup in 2004. Hapoel Tel Aviv won the Eurocup in 2025.

The Israel national basketball team has participated 23 times in the European Championship. Their best achievements were a silver medal in EuroBasket 1979, and 5th place in 1953 and 1977. The national team also played in two World Championships and once in the Summer Olympic Games.

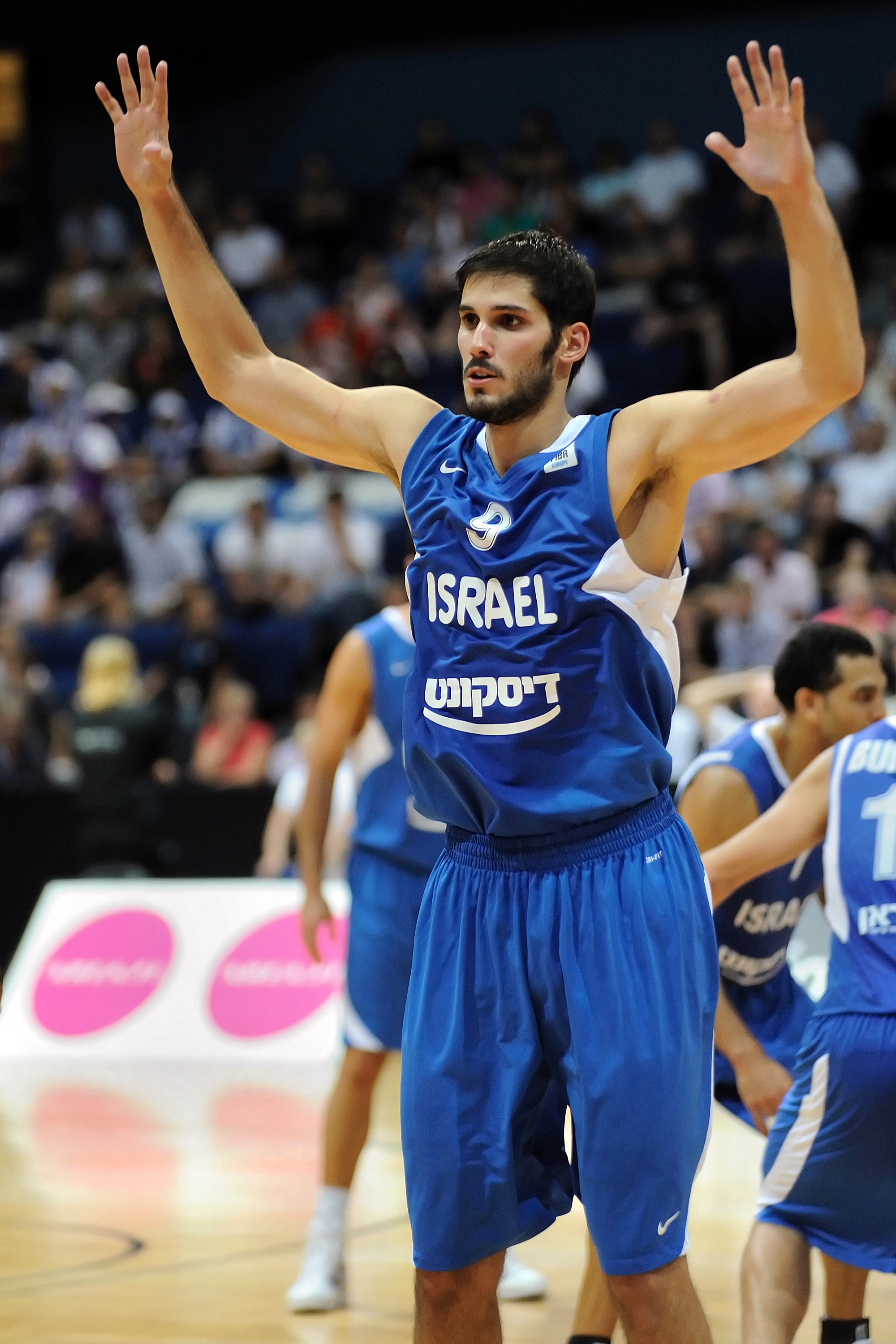
Casspi, playing for Israel in 2010

Israeli basketball is known for its national under-20 team, winning back to back gold medals in 2018 & 2019, three silver medals in 2000, 2004, 2017, and finishing 4th three times (1994, 2005, 2022), 5th (1992), and 6th (2007). Israel U-20 also took place in the U-21 World Championship, finishing twice in 7th place (2001, 2005), and 6th place (1993).

The renowned "Israeli coaching school" produced many of the most successful European basketball coaches, such as Ralph Klein, Pini Gershon, David Blatt, and Zvi Sherf.

Deni Avdija is an active player in the NBA, Omri Casspi previously played in the NBA. Gal Mekel, previously played in the NBA and Shay Doron previously played in the WNBA. David Blatt coached the NBA Cleveland Cavaliers. Other notable Israeli basketball players have included:

- Moshe "Miki" Berkovich, Israel, Euroleague, 6'4" shooting guard
- Oded Kattash, Israel, Euroleague, 6'4" shooting guard
- Doron Sheffer, Israel, NCAA, Euroleague, 6'5" point guard
- Nadav Henefeld, Israel, NCAA, Eurolegue, 6'7 power forward
- Tal Brody, US & Israel, Euroleague 6' 2" shooting guard
- Lior Eliyahu, Israel, 6' 9" power forward, NBA draft 2006 (Orlando Magic; traded to Houston Rockets)
- Yotam Halperin, Israel, 6' 5" guard, drafted in 2006 NBA draft by Seattle SuperSonics
- Omri Casspi, Israel, 6' 9" power forward, drafted in 2009 NBA draft by Sacramento Kings
- Gal Mekel, Israel, 6' 3" guard, drafted in 2009 NBA draft by Dallas Mavericks
- Deni Avdija, Israel, 6' 9" power forward, drafted in 2019 NBA draft by Washington Wizards

=== Baseball ===
Baseball was first introduced into the region on July 4, 1927, when baseball equipment was distributed at the Sephardic Orphanage in Jerusalem.

The Israel Baseball League, managed by Larry Baras, was established in 2007. It was the first professional baseball league in the Middle East. In its first and only season it had six teams that played in three stadiums. The first and only champions were the Bet Shemesh Blue Sox managed by Ron Blomberg.

The Israel national baseball team applied, unsuccessfully, to participate in the 2009 World Baseball Classic. They were subsequently invited to participate in the newly created qualifying round of the 2013 World Baseball Classic. During the 2017 World Baseball Classic qualifier Israel qualified for the main tournament and finished in sixth place.

Team Israel won the 2019 European Baseball Championship – B-Pool in early July 2019 in Blagoevgrad, Bulgaria, winning all five of its games. It thus advanced to the playoffs against Team Lithuania in the 2019 Playoff Series at the end of July 2019 for the last qualifying spot for the 2019 European Baseball Championship. Israel won the best-of-three playoff series 2–0, and thereby qualified for the 2019 European Baseball Championship.

In Round 1 of the 2019 European Baseball Championship, Israel went 4–1. The team thereby advanced to the Championship's eight-team playoffs. In the Championship playoffs, Israel defeated Team France in the quarterfinals, lost to Team Italy in the semi-finals, and came in fourth.

Because Team Israel finished in the top five in the 2019 European Baseball Championship, it earned the right to participate in the 2020 Olympics qualifiers Africa/Europe Qualifying Event. As the winner of that tournament it qualified to be one of the six national teams that competed at the 2020 Summer Olympics in Tokyo.

Every member of the 24-member Team Israel that competed to qualify in the Olympics was Israeli, with four of the players native-born. The others made aliyah to Israel, under Israel's Law of Return, which gives anyone with a Jewish parent or grandparent or who is married to a Jew the right to return to Israel and be granted Israeli citizenship.

=== Chess ===
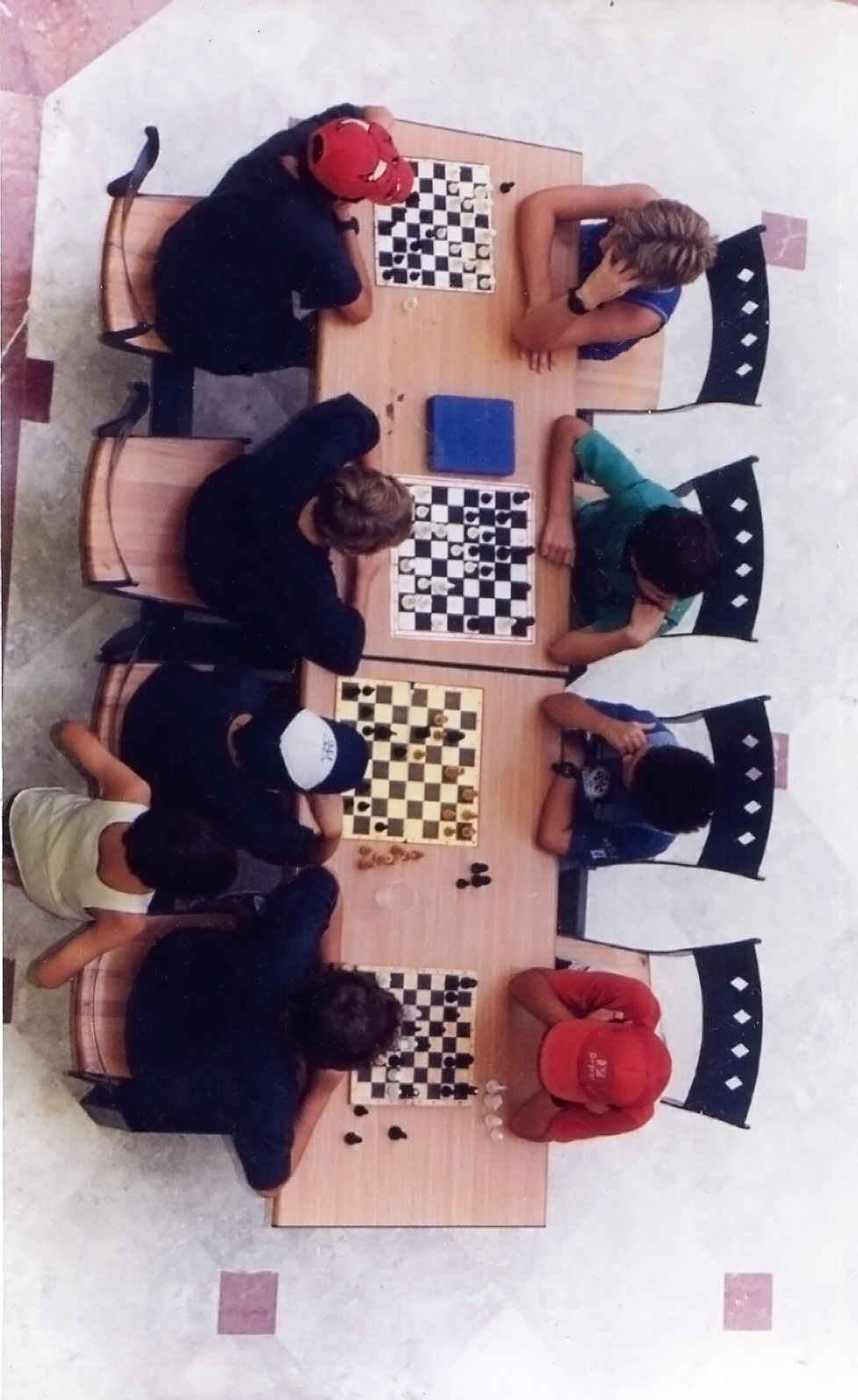
Chess match in Arad

Chess is a leading sport in Israel. There are many Israeli grandmasters and Israeli chess players have won a number of youth world championships. Israel stages an annual international championship and hosted the World Team Chess Championship in 2005. The Ministry of Education and the World Chess Federation agreed upon a project of teaching chess within Israeli schools, and it has been introduced into the curriculum of some schools. The city of Beersheba has become a national chess center, with the game being taught in its kindergartens. Owing partly to Soviet immigration, it is home to the largest number of chess grandmasters of any city in the world. The Israeli chess team won the silver medal at the 2008 Chess Olympiad and the bronze, coming in third among 148 teams, at the 2010 Olympiad. Israeli grandmaster Boris Gelfand won the Chess World Cup 2009.

While chess, as an intellectual sport, has always been played in Israel, the arrival of large numbers of Jewish immigrants from the former Soviet Union in the 1990s brought many chess grandmasters to Israel and increased interest in the game.

=== Swimming ===
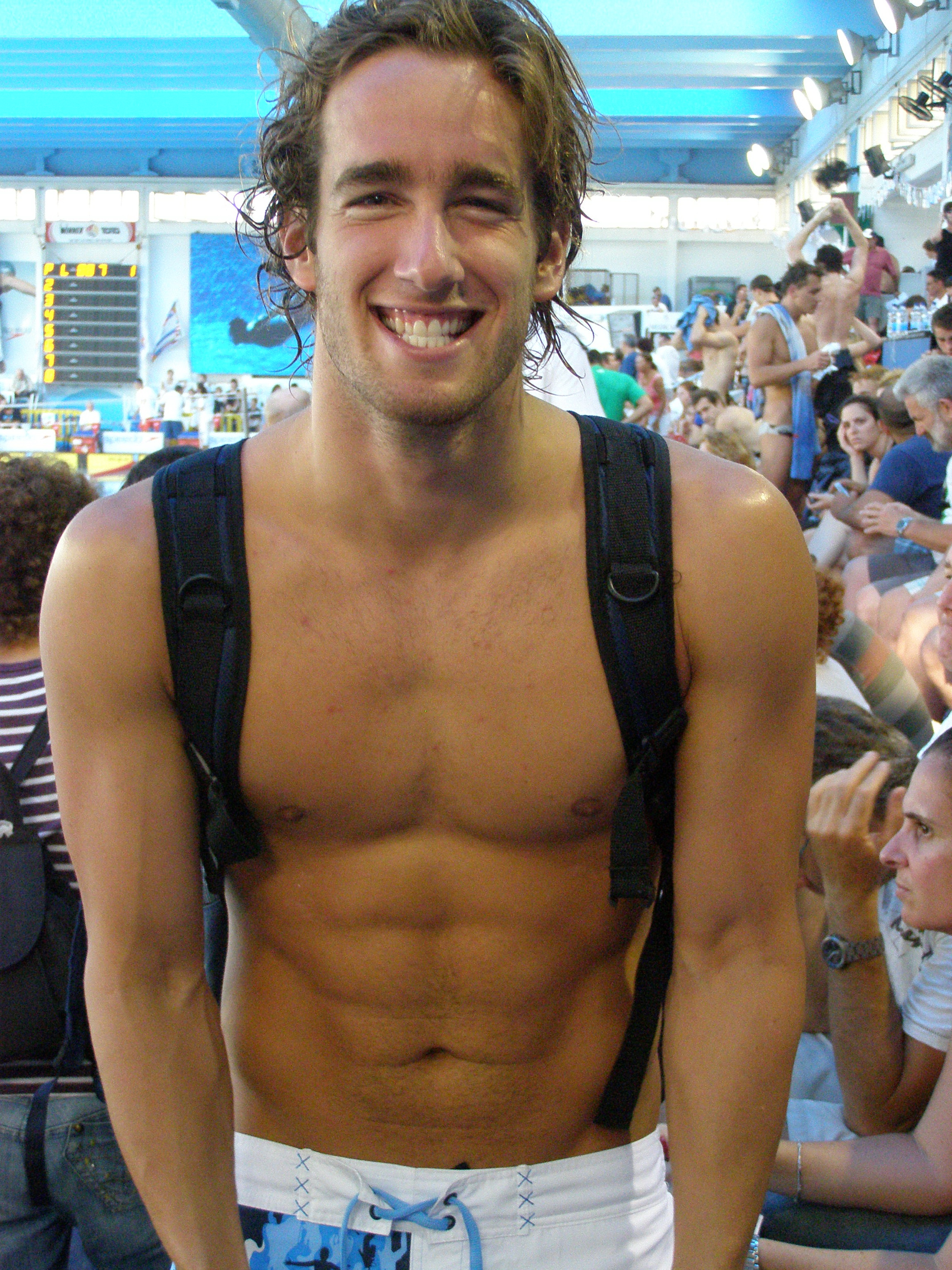
Swimmer Guy Barne'a

Israel Swimming Association is the major swimming federation in Israel. Swimming is popular at Israel's many beaches along the Mediterranean coast, in the Sea of Galilee (including open-water swimming marathons), in the Red Sea at the shores of Eilat, in the Dead Sea and in swimming pools. Famous Israeli swimmers include Eithan Urbach, Michael Halika, Gal Nevo, Yoav Gath, Yoav Bruck, Vered Borochovski, Amit Ivry, and Anna Gostomelsky. At the 1996 Summer Olympics in Atlanta, Israel's team qualified to the final of the prestigious Men's 4 × 100 metre medley relay. Uri Bergman won 12 gold medals at the Paralympic Games, and other paralympic swimmers such as Izhak Mamistvalov and Keren Leibovitch won several gold medals as well.

The country's first swimming pool was built in 1933 as part of the Jerusalem YMCA. The first regulation-size swimming pool was built in 1935, just before the second Maccabiah, in Bat Galim.

=== Rowing ===
Rowing is a growing sport in Israel, and has seen a major breakthrough in recent years. Dani Fridman, Israel Champion, is currently ranked 10th in the world, and Moran Samuel is Israel's 1st rowing world champion (paralympic). Samuel, won her first Paralympic bronze medal, after coming 3rd at the Rio 2016 Summer Paralympics. Other Rio 2016 participants are Yulia Chernoy and Reuven Magnagey, who rowed together in a double scull boat and finished 9th.

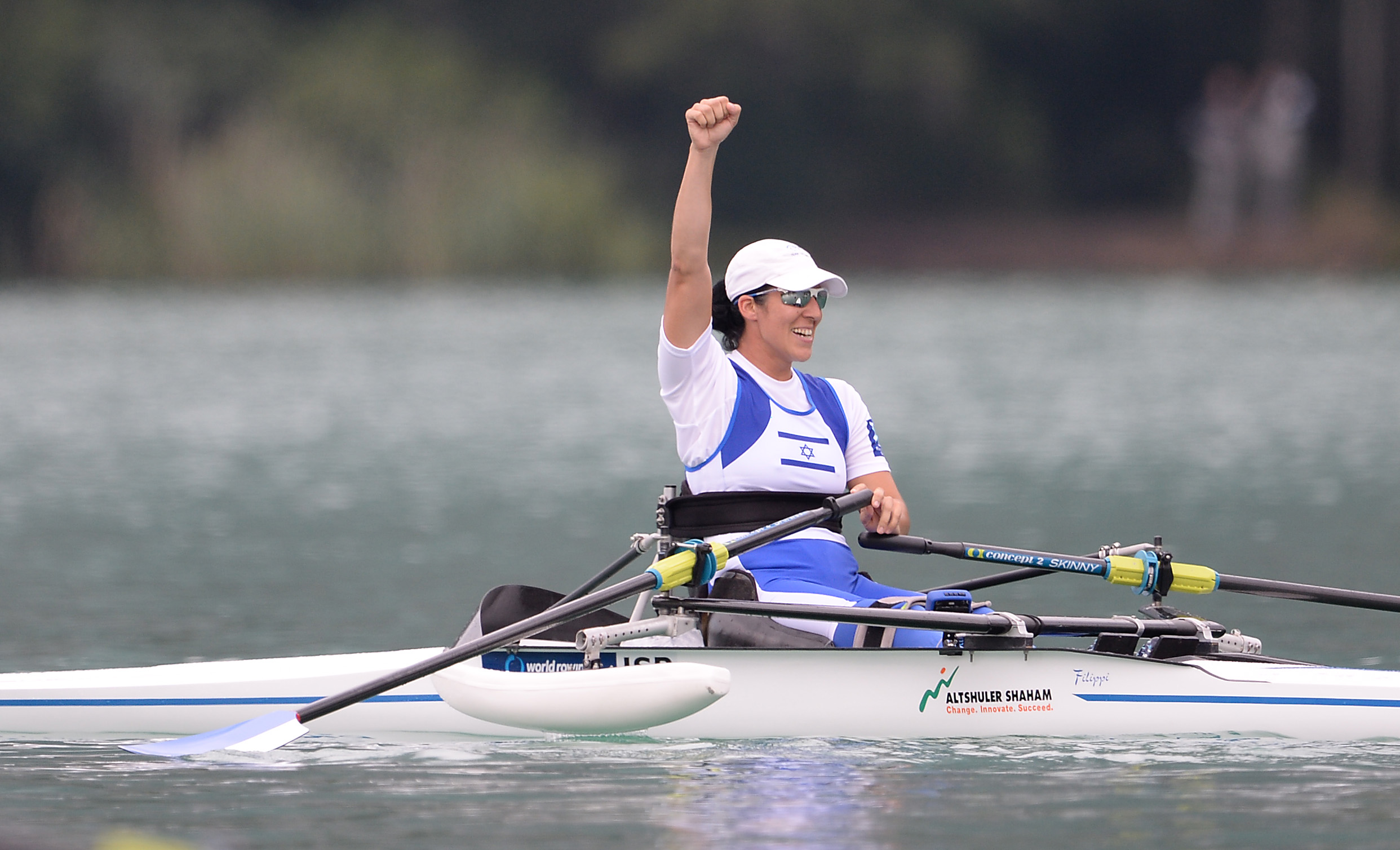
Moran Samuel, World Champion

The Daniel Rowing Centre in Tel Aviv is Israel's prime training facility, and the home of the national Olympic and Paralympic squad. The sport is practiced in Tel Aviv Yarkon River, Kishon Port of Haifa and Tiberius Sea of Galilee.

Other prominent athletes are Oleg Gonorovski, Tomer Shvartsman, Roni Iuster and Diana Egerton-Warburton.

The Israeli Rowing Federation is an active member of the International Rowing Federation – FISA.

=== Tennis ===
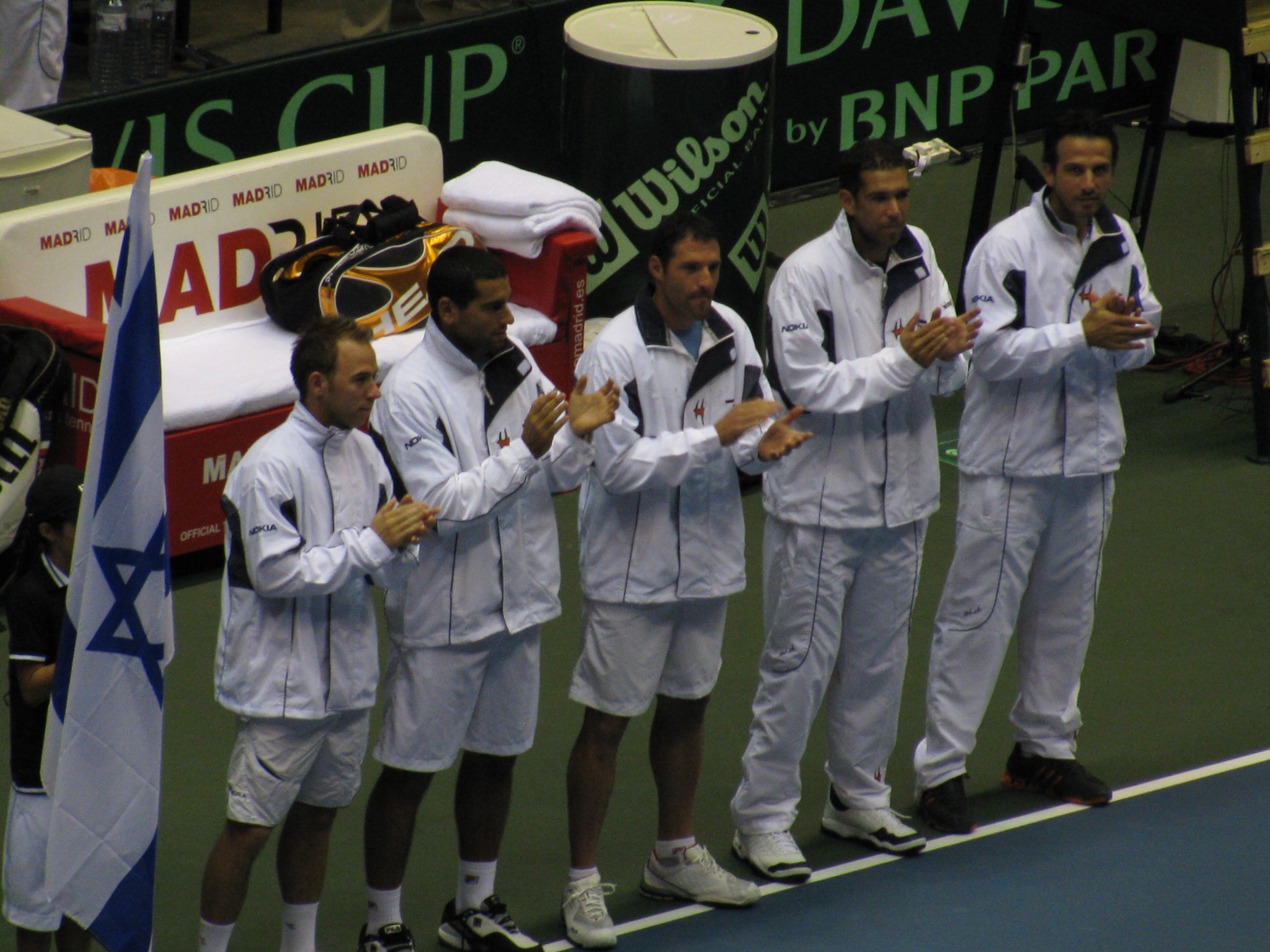
Israel Davis Cup Team, 2009

Highly ranked players include Shlomo Glickstein (world ranked #22 at his peak), Amos Mansdorf (ranked #18 at his best), Dudi Sela (ranked #29 at his best), Anna Smashnova (ranked #15 at her best), Shahar Pe'er (ranked #11 at her best) as well as the doubles team of Andy Ram and Jonathan Erlich (world #5 team in 2006 and 2008 Australian Open champions) – all of whom have trained at the Israel Tennis Centers. Since 2008, both men's and the women's teams have qualified for the top groups in the world – the men are in the Davis Cup world group, and the women are in the Fed Cup world group I. In December 2012, 12-year-old Yshai Oliel of Ramla, Israel, won the 51st Junior Orange Bowl International Tennis Championship for his age group.

=== Track and field ===
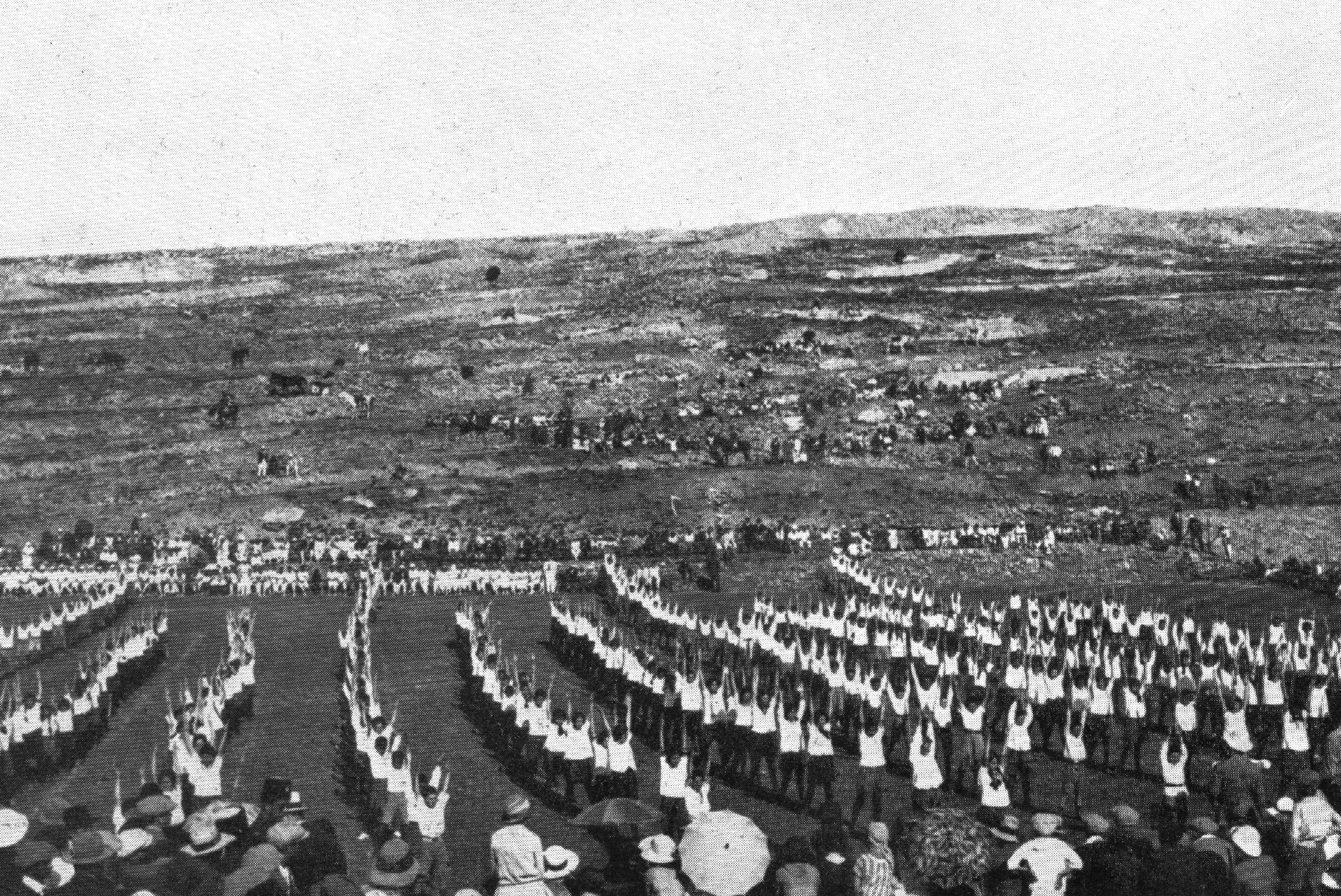
Calisthenics in Beit Hakerem, Jerusalem, c. 1925

Track and field athletics in Israel are mainly focused around the Maccabiah Games and the international Olympic Games, where Israel has achieved notable successes during its short history. The Soviet-born Aleksandr Averbukh was the most successful Israeli track and field athlete, having won three gold medals in the pole vault at European championships (2000 — indoor, 2002 and 2006) as well as two medals at the World championships (1999 and 2001).

On August 5, 2022, Israeli-born Blessing Afrifah won the gold medal in the 200 meter race at the World Athletics U20 Championships.

==== Marathons ====
Long-distance running is popular in Israel. The Tiberias Marathon, Tel Aviv Marathon, and the Jerusalem Marathon take place annually in January, February, and March respectively. Another half marathon is held annually at Ein Gedi, near the Dead Sea. There are various other shorter distance races over the course of the year through very different regions and terrains.

Maru Teferi is an Israeli two-time Olympic marathoner. He won a silver medal in marathon at the 2023 World Athletics Championships, a silver medal in marathon at the 2022 European Athletics Championships, and the gold medal at the 2022 Fukuoka International Marathon.

== Minor sports ==
=== American football ===
The center of American football in Israel is the Kraft Family Stadium in Jerusalem. Currently, there are 4 leagues playing Flag Football. The WAFI which has 13 teams: high school level which has 12 teams and a youth team, all under the association of The AFI. In addition, there are three leagues playing tackle-football: a junior high school football league (which has donated equipment), a high school league – IHFL and an adult's league – IFL (Israeli Football League). The IFL has 11 teams coming from Jerusalem, Petah Tikva, Tel Aviv, Haifa, Beersheba and Ramat HaSharon. The game is mainly played by ex-pats from America, South Africa, England and France. The largest league in 2007 was men's contact who competed in the annual Holyland Bowl championship. Some 1000 players are involved in weekly football activities.

In 2015 the Israel national American football team had their first international game, in the qualifier for the European Championship.

=== Boxing ===
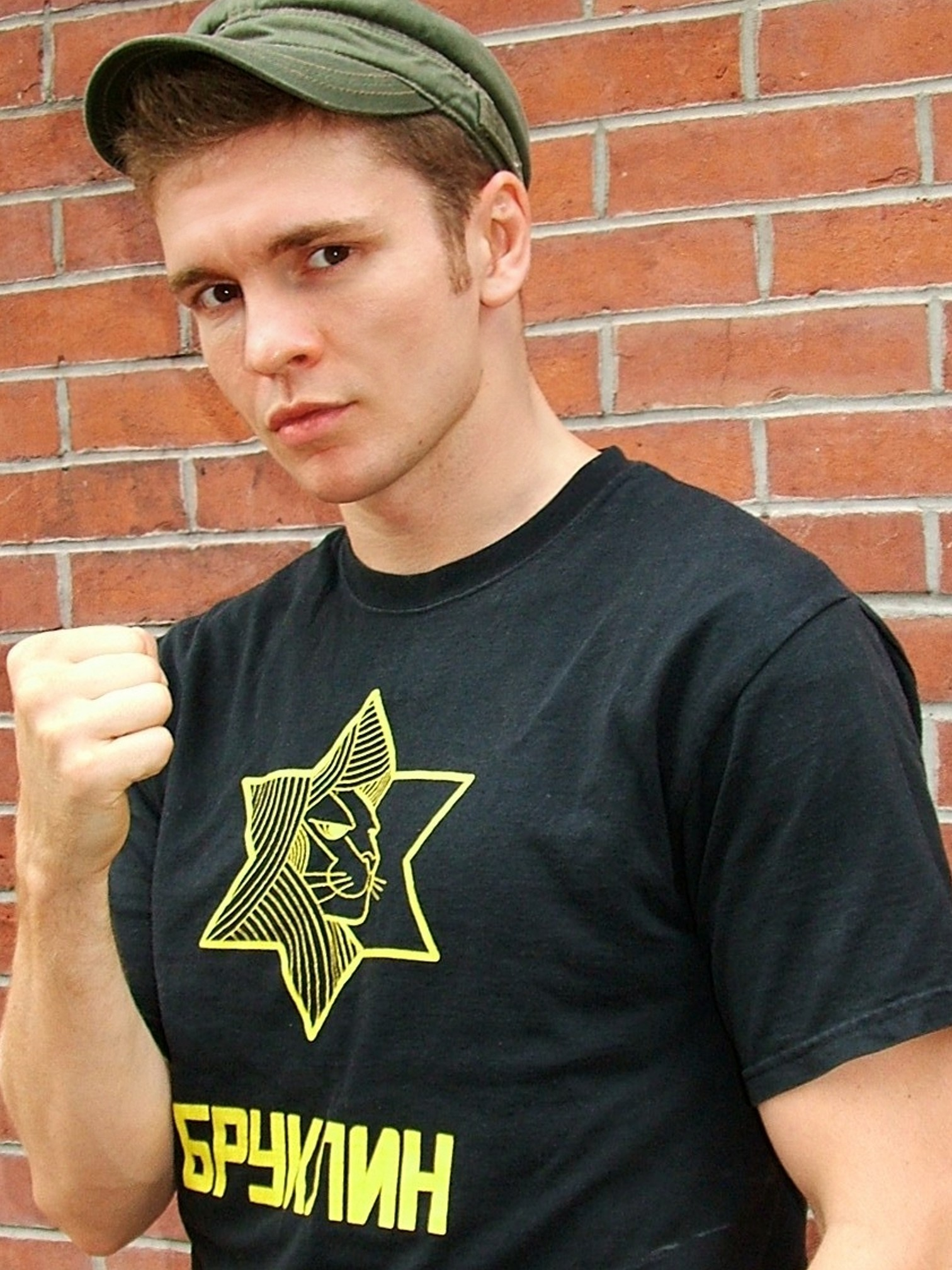
Yuri Foreman

In Israel, boxing is not just a sport but an educational vehicle for helping young people overcome prejudices. The Israel Boxing Association (IBA) operates certified gyms in cities throughout the country, with 1,800 active members from Arab villages and Ethiopian and Russian immigrant population centers. Boxers as young as 11 train and participate in matches organized by the association. Israeli Yuri Foreman is a former World Boxing Association super welterweight champion. Roman Greenberg is currently International Boxing Organization's (IBO's) Intercontinental heavyweight champion. Hagar Finer is the WIBF champion bantamweight.

Adi Rotem of Tel Aviv is the current world champion in Thai boxing in the under-52 kilogram class. Ilya Grad is considered one of the eight best amateur Thai boxers in the world. In February 2012, Grad won the WCK international title in China and was permitted to enter Malaysia, which has no diplomatic relations with Israel, on an Israeli passport. Ido Pariente is an Israel lightweight Pankration World Champion.

=== Canoeing ===
Michael Kolganov, a Soviet (Uzbek)-born Israeli sprint canoer, has been a world champion and won an Olympic bronze in the K-1 500-meter.

=== Cricket ===
Israel became an associate member of the ICC in 1974. Israel competed in the 1979 ICC Trophy, the inaugural edition of what is now the Cricket World Cup Qualifier, but failed to get past the first round. They also failed to progress beyond the first round in the 1982 and 1986 tournaments. They reached the plate competition of the ICC Trophy in 1990 and 1994 and in 1996 competed in their first European Championship in Denmark, finishing eighth in the eight team tournament.

In the 1997 ICC Trophy in Malaysia, they faced political demonstrations throughout the tournament from the Islamic Party of Malaysia. They were the first Israeli sports team to play in the country and finished in 21st place.

In 1998, they finished ninth in the European Championship ahead of only Gibraltar and the following year travelled to Gibraltar to take part in a quadrangular tournament also involving France and Italy.

Israel have been playing in Division Two of the European Championships since 2000, finishing fifth in 2000, fourth in 2002, sixth in 2004 and seventh in 2006.

In November 2007, Israel were defeated in a relegation match against Croatia, in the first international cricket game played in Israel. The loss meant that they were relegated from Europe Division Two to Europe Division Three. In 2009 they were re-promoted to second division with a win over Croatia.

At the 2016 ICC Europe Division Two tournament Israel finished fourth, behind Germany, Sweden, and Spain

There is a night cricket league playing a modified form of indoor cricket.

=== Curling ===
Israel national men's curling team has been competing as part of the European playdowns since 2014. Israel has sent teams to the world mixed, world mixed doubles and world men's seniors competitions as well.

=== Equestrian ===
Notable Israeli equestrians include:

- Daniel Bluman (born 1990), Colombian-born Israeli Olympic show jumping rider

=== Fencing ===
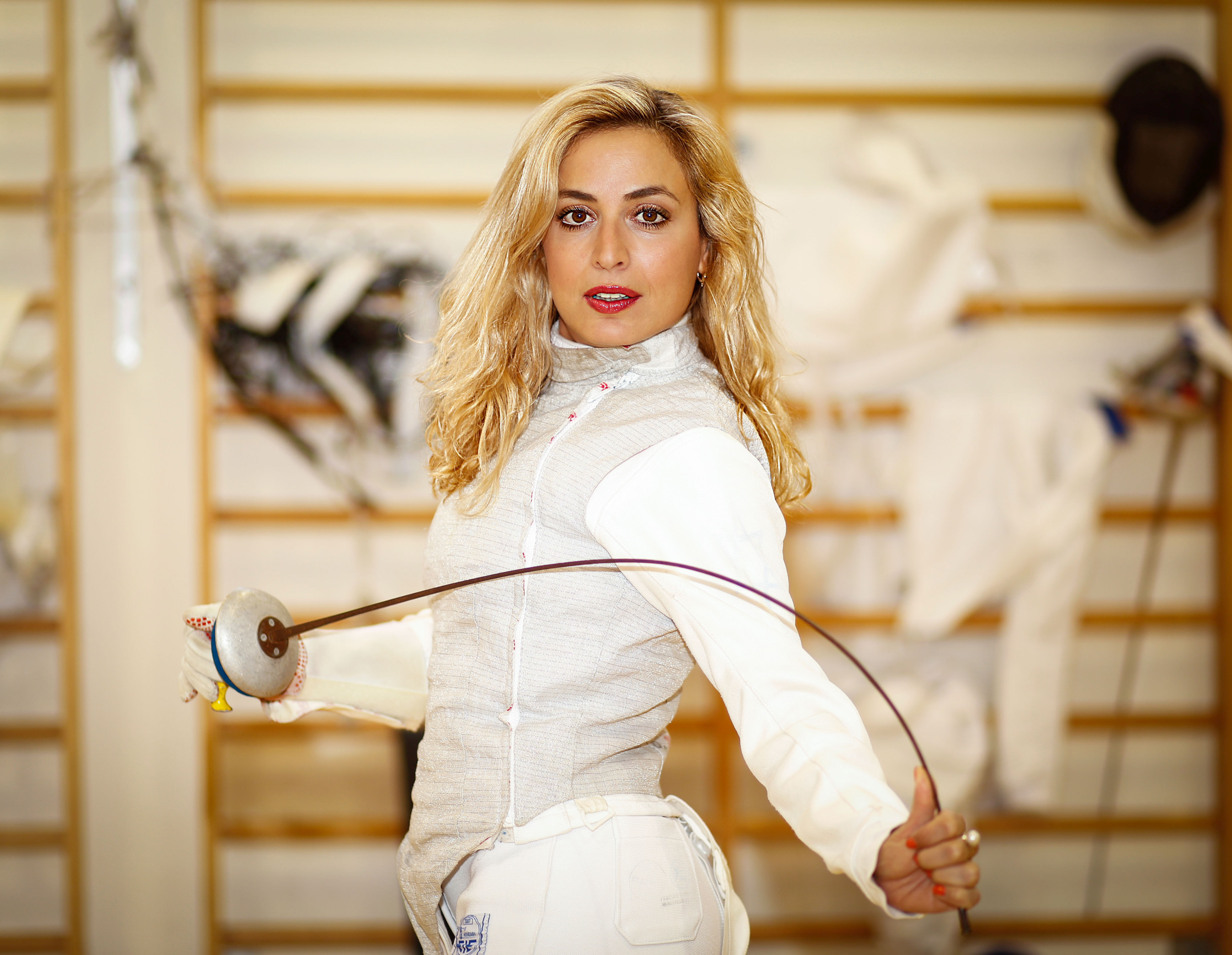
Delila Hatuel

Notable Israeli fencers have included:

- Boaz Ellis (foil), five-time Israeli champion
- Delila Hatuel (foil), Olympian, ranked ninth in the world
- Lydia Hatuel-Czuckermann (foil), 20x Israeli champion
- Noam Mills (épée), female Olympic fencer, junior world champion
- Ayelet Ohayon (foil), European champion
- Yuval Freilich (épée), European champion (2019)
- Andre Spitzer, killed by terrorists

=== Figure skating ===
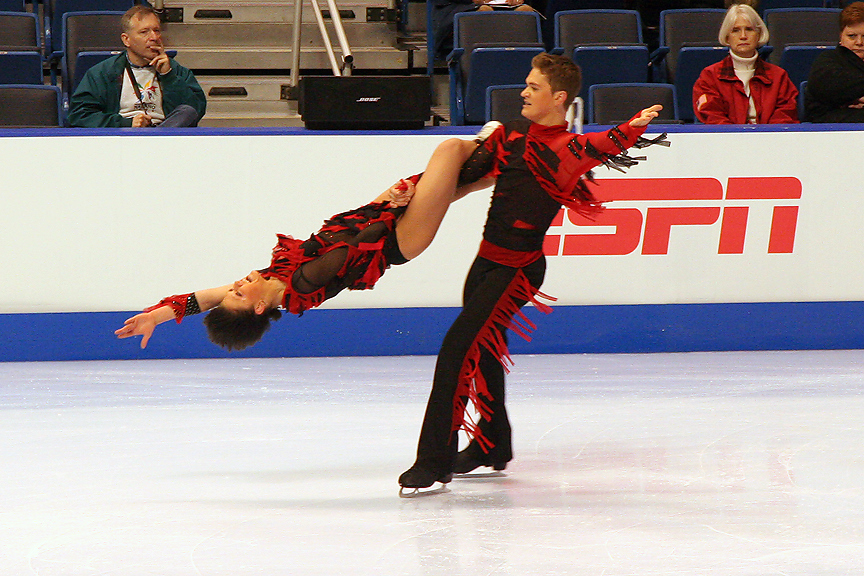
Zaretski & Zaretski, 2006

Israel has one regulation ice rink, located in Metulla, a city on the Lebanese border. Israel has been sending teams to the Winter Olympics since 1994. In 2002, Galit Chait (world championship bronze medalist) and Sergei Sakhnovski (world championship bronze medalist) finished sixth in ice dancing. Alexandra Zaretski, Belarusian-born Israeli, ice dancer, Olympian, and Roman Zaretski, Belarusian-born Israeli, ice dancer, Olympian a brother and sister ice-dancing pair, came in ninth in the 2008 world championships and first in the 2009 World University Games.

Other notable Israeli skaters include:

- Alexei Beletski, Ukrainian-born Israeli, ice dancer, Olympian
- Natalia Gudina, Ukrainian-born Israeli, figure skater, Olympian
- Tamar Katz, US-born Israeli, figure skater
- Lionel Rumi, Israel, ice dancer
- Michael Shmerkin, Soviet-born Israeli, figure skater

=== Golf ===
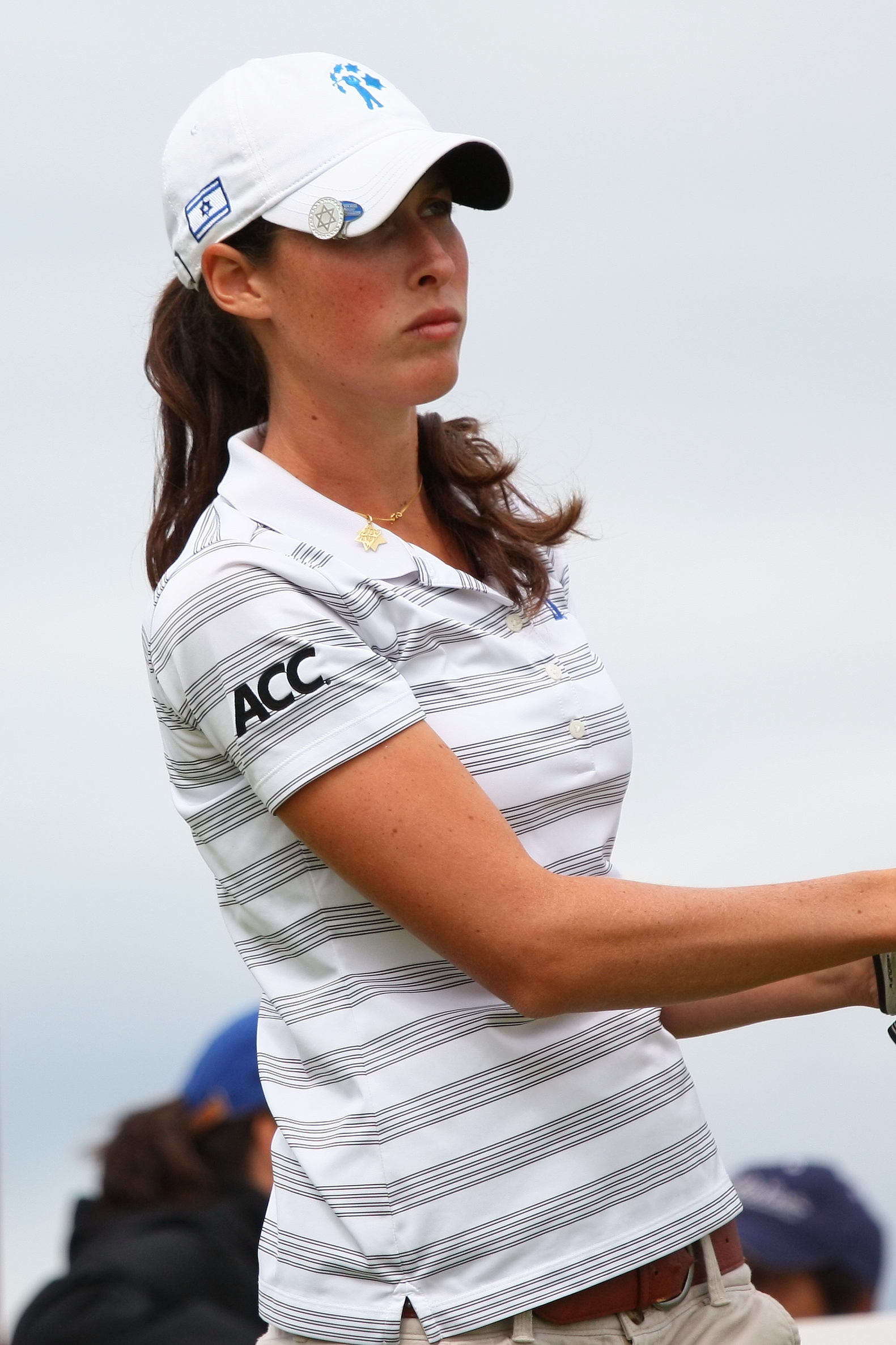
Laetitia Beck

Israel has a single 18-hole golf course named Caesarea Golf & Country Club, located in the town of Caesarea. Notable Israeli golfers include Big Break contestant Oren Geri, Ron “Racehorse” Smith, Rami Asayag, Asher Iyasu and world blind golfing champion Zohar Sharon. Laetitia Beck has won the Israeli Championship five times, including for the first time when she was 12 years of age, and won gold medals in golf in both the 2009 and 2013 Maccabiah Games, and is the first Israeli to compete in an LPGA Tour tournament.

=== Gymnastics ===
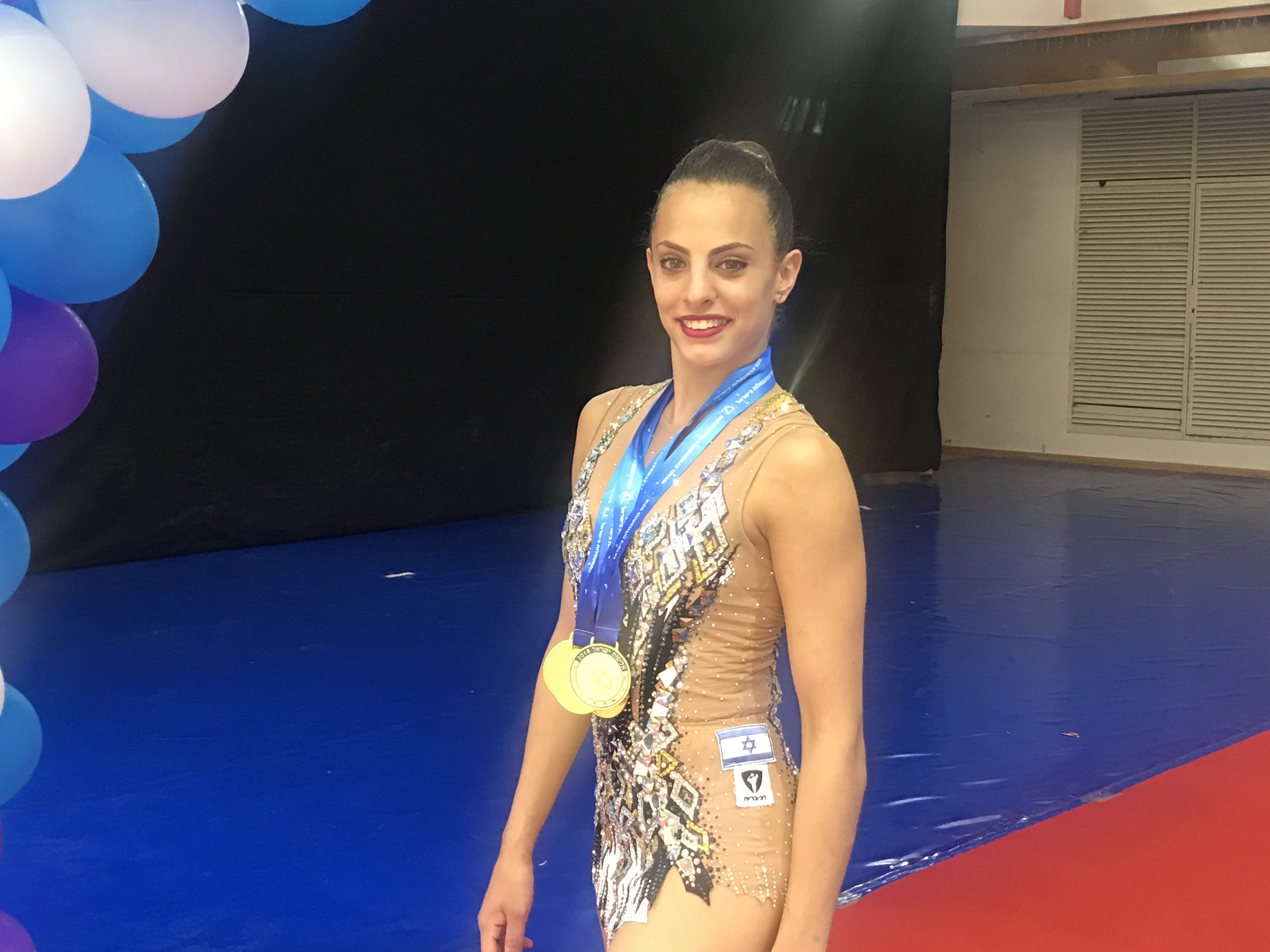
Rhythmic gymnast Linoy Ashram

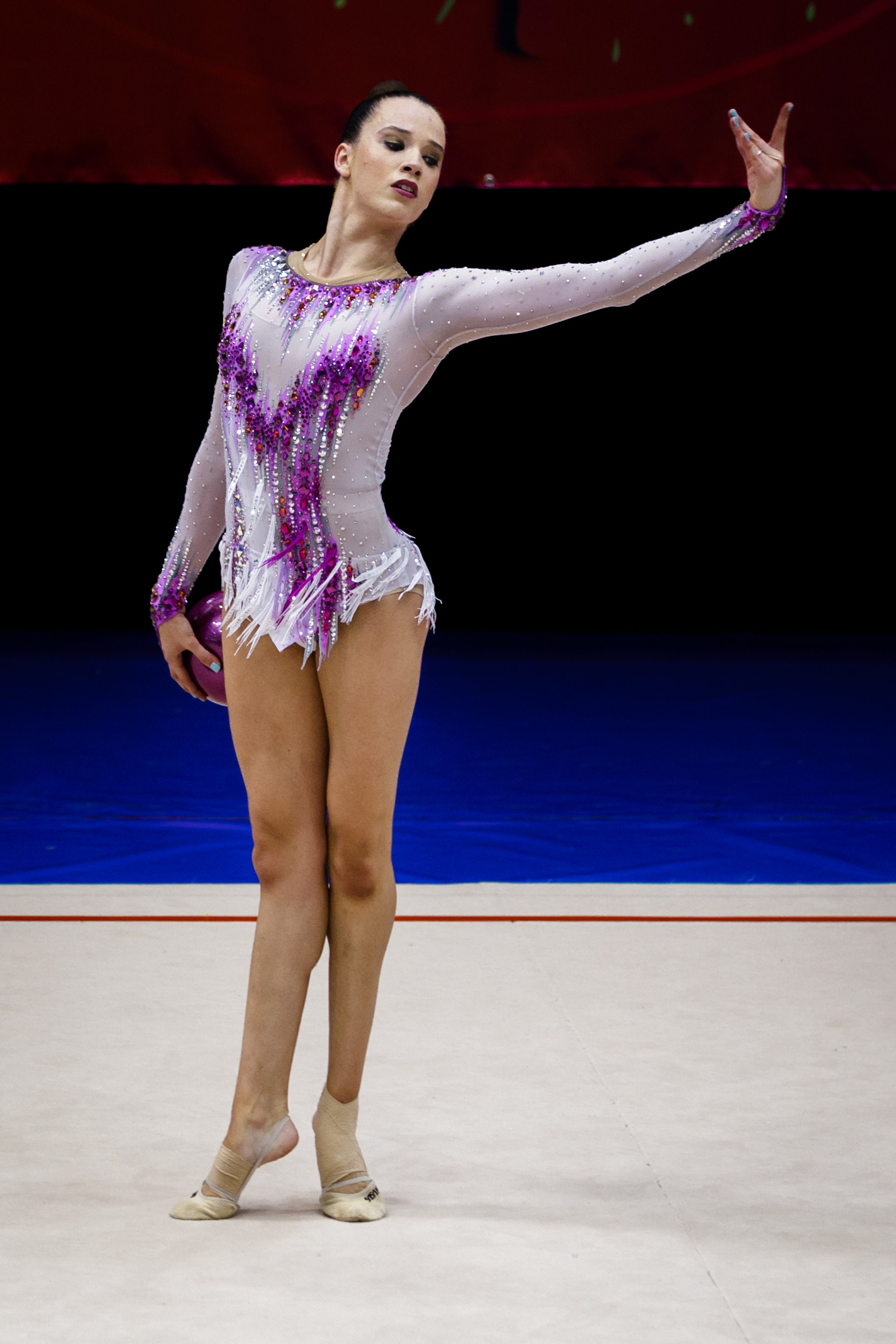
Rhythmic gymnast Nicol Zelikman

Israeli gymnast Neta Rivkin won a silver medal in the Rhythmic Gymnastics European Championships held in Minsk in 2011, to become the first gymnast of the country to win a medal at the European Championships. Rivkin also won the first world medal for Israel in rhythmic gymnastics at the World Rhythmic Gymnastics Championships held in Montpellier, France in 2011, and she won the bronze medal at the hoop final. The Israeli rhythmic gymnastic group also won the bronze medal at the event final of 3 ribbons and 2 hoops at the World Championships in Montpellier.

Linoy Ashram became the first Israeli rhythmic gymnast to win an individual all-around medal at the 2017 World Championships. She is the most decorated Israeli rhythmic gymnast, with 6 silver and 5 bronze medals at the World Championships (2017, 2018, 2019), 2 bronze medals at the 2017 European Championships and 2 gold and 2 silver medals at the 2019 European Games and recently at the 2020 European Championships, she won the gold medal in the Individual All-Around Event making her the first Israeli to win an All Around gold medal in the European Championships.

In 2013, Alexander Shatilov won a gold medal at the European championship in gymnastics in Moscow, Russia. In 2017, Artem Dolgopyat, an Israeli artistic gymnast, won a silver medal at the World Championships. In 2021, Artem Dolgopyat, an Israeli artistic gymnast, won a gold medal at the 2020 Summer Olympics.

=== Handball ===
Israel's men's national handball team participated in the 2002 European Men's Handball Championship in Sweden. Local power Hapoel Rishon Lezion qualified for the quarterfinals of the EHF Champions League in 2000.

=== Ice hockey ===
Ice hockey started in Israel in 1986 when the first rink opened in Kiryat Motzkin. Israel has a following of over 1,000 ice hockey players. Israel took part in the 2007 Ice Hockey Division II World Championships.

Notable players have included:

- Eliezer Sherbatov, Israel, left wing (Israel men's national ice hockey team)
- Max Birbraer, Russian from Kazakhstan; lived & played in Israel; 1st Israeli drafted by NHL team (New Jersey Devils)
- Oren Eizenman (Israel national team)

=== Lacrosse ===
The Israel men's national lacrosse team has competed in the European Lacrosse Championships in 2012 finishing in 8th place, and in 2016 finished 2nd. Additionally they finished 7th at the World Lacrosse Championship in 2014.

Domestically, there are two men's clubs and one women's club that operate within Israel.

In 2025, the Israeli team won first place in the European Men's Lacrosse Championship.

The Israel women's national lacrosse team won the bronze medal at the 2026 World Lacrosse Women's Championship in Tokyo, defeating the Haudenosaunee 7–4 in the third-place game. It was Israel's first medal at the women's world championship.

=== Martial arts ===
Krav Maga is taught to most citizens in the army, and practiced recreationally throughout the country. The Association of Martial Arts in Israel is chaired by Hamad Amar, an Israeli Druze member of the Knesset. Krav Maga’s effectiveness and practical approach to self-defense have won it widespread admiration and adherence around the world.

Nili Block is a world champion kickboxer and Muay Thai fighter. Yulia Sachkov is a world champion kickboxer.

Judo is one of the five sports in which Israeli athletes have won Olympic medals. It is the most successful Israeli sport at the Olympics providing five of the nine Olympic medals Israel has won. In 2013, Yarden Gerbi won a gold medal at the Judo World Championships, and in 2016 she won a bronze medal at the Olympics. Other notable Israeli judokas include:

- Yael Arad, Israel, Olympic silver (light-middleweight)
- Daniela Krukower, Israel/Argentina, world champion (under 63 kg)
- Sagi Muki, Israel, World Judo Championships gold (half-middleweight)
- Alice Schlesinger, Israel, World Judo Championships bronze; European junior champion (under 63 kg)
- Oren Smadja, Israel, Olympic bronze (lightweight)
- Ehud Vaks, Israel, (half-lightweight)
- Arik Ze'evi, Israel, Olympic bronze (100 kg)

=== Motorsport ===
The Israel Motor-Sport Association was founded in 1990. It has organised rally, autocross, rallycross and drag racing competitions.

Auto racing was legalized in 2011. A 1.5 km permanent racetrack was opened in Port of Eilat, where Formula Israel competitions are held.

Notable Israeli drivers include Chanoch Nissany (Formula One test-driver), Roy Nissany and Alon Day.

=== Netball ===
Netball was introduced in Israel in 1999 by Jodi Carreira. Today there are clubs in Ra'anana, Modi'in, Jerusalem, Kfar Etzion and Tel Aviv, all of which have teams participating in the Israel National Netball League. Israel Netball has sent senior and junior teams to international events, culminating in its first international win in Ireland in June 2008. The netball tournament of the Maccabiah has been hosted by Israel Netball since 2001. Currently ranked 36, Israel is a member of the International Netball Federation and of Netball Europe.

=== Rugby ===
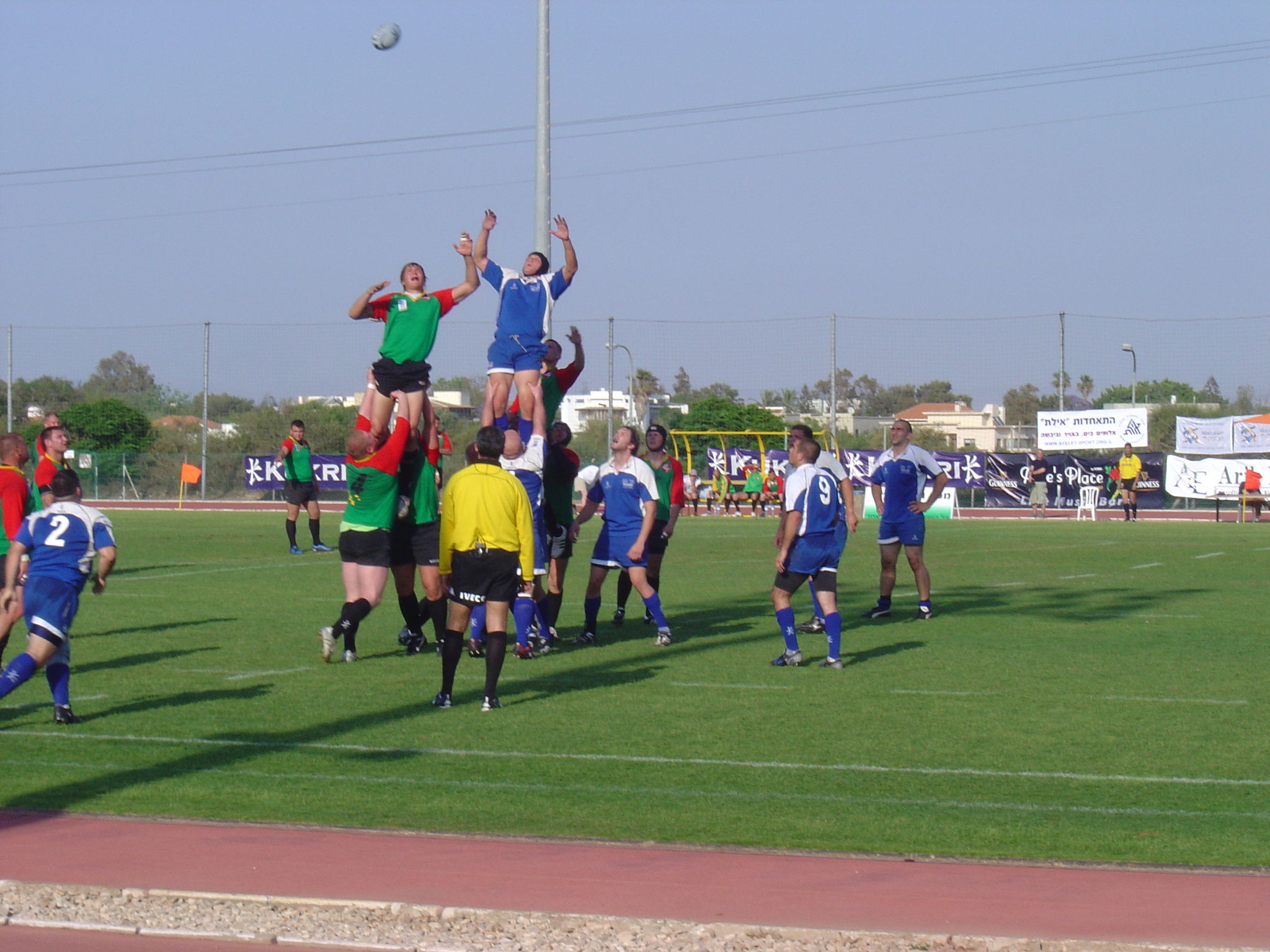
Lithuania national rugby union team playing Israel

Rugby union is a minor sport brought to the country by British soldiers during the Mandate era. The first game post-independence was in 1951, organized by Leo Camron. A wave of immigration from English speaking countries, and France, since 1967 renewed interest in the sport, particularly in areas with large English-speaking populations such as Ra'anana and Jerusalem. A national league was set up in 1972, and the Israel Rugby Union (now Rugby Israel) formed in 1975. Israel's first international match was away to Switzerland on 25 May 1981, and ended 9–9. The Israel Union joined the International Rugby Board in 1988. Rugby union has also featured at the Maccabiah Games since 1981. Israel has entered the Rugby World Cup Sevens.

The women's rugby league in Israel consists of two teams in Tel Aviv, two in Haifa and one each in Jerusalem, Galilee and Ra’anana. An eighth club is scheduled to open in Beersheba in October 2019.

Kibbutz Yizre'el has been a big centre of Rugby in Israel after a group of South African Olim made a push to make the game bigger in the country.

=== Snooker ===
The Israel Snooker and Pool Association (ISPA) is the governing body of snooker in Israel, and organizes the country's tournaments in the sport. Israel hosted the EBSA European 6 Reds Snooker Championship in 2019 after Shachar Ruberg had won the tournament the previous year.

The Israeli-Scottish professional snooker player Eden Sharav represented Israel at the World Snooker Tour in the 2018-19 to 2020-21 seasons after previously having played under the Scottish flag.

=== Softball ===
The Israel Softball Association (fastpitch) was established in 1979 by a group of immigrants from North and South America. The Israel Softball Association is a registered Non Profit Organization which is recognized by the Sports Authorities in Israel and is a member of "Ayelet" – the Israeli Association of Non-Olympic Competitive Sports. The activities conducted by the Israel Softball Association have assisted in the social integration of immigrants countrywide, and today its members also include many native Israelis. The Association consists of 10 men's teams Divided into A Pool and B Pool, 3 women's teams,21 junior boys teams and 4 junior girls teams. The Israeli National Teams represent the country in European Championships and other International Competitions.

=== Water polo ===
Both men and women competed at the 2022 European Championships. By virture of its performance at the 2022 European Championships, the women's side qualified for the 2023 World Championships, being the first time the team will compete in this tournament. Israel will host the 2024 European Championships.

=== Windsurfing ===
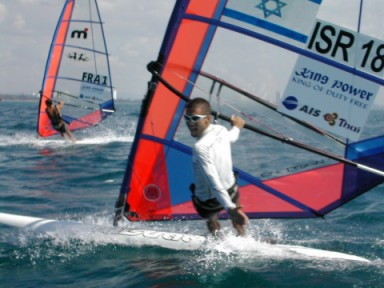
Gal Fridman, winner of Israel's first Olympic gold medal

Israeli windsurfer Gal Fridman won two Olympic medals, gold and bronze, and was inducted into the International Jewish Sports Hall of Fame. Israeli windsurfer Shahar Tzuberi won a bronze medal at the 2008 Olympic Games in Beijing. In March 2012, Israeli windsurfer Lee Korzits won the women's RS-X title in the Sailing World Championships for the third time in a row. Israeli windsurfer Katy Spychakov won a silver medal in the Women's 2019 RS:X World Championships, and was an U21 winner in the Women's 2019 RS:X World Championships. At the 2024 Summer Olympics, Tom Reuveny won the gold medal in the Men's iQFoil, and Sharon Kantor won the silver medal in the Women's IQ Foil.

=== Wrestling ===
Seven Israeli wrestlers competed at the 2010 Senior European Championship in Baku. Four were Greco-Roman wrestlers while the others were freestyle. Gotsha Tzitziashvily competed at the Summer Olympics in Athens. He held the world championship title in the 84-kilogram weight class in 2003.

=== Stand up paddle boarding ===
Stand up paddle boarding is becoming increasingly popular in Israel. The country’s flat waters allow for activities like the "4 Seas in 4 Days" expedition. With the paddling on flat water, many people in Israel use paddleboards to surf waves.

== Maccabiah Games ==
The Maccabiah Games are an international Jewish athletic event, similar to the Olympics, held every four years in Israel. The first games were held in 1932.

== Boycotts of Israel in sports ==
Israeli athletes and teams are barred from some competitions. In addition, in many worldwide competitions, such as the Olympics, some Arab and Muslim competitors avoid competing against Israelis. Some countries force their athletes not to compete against Israelis or in Israel. Mushir Salem Jawher, a Kenyan-born marathoner, lost his Bahraini citizenship after competing in the Kinneret Marathon in Israel.

In light of the fatalities of 38,000 Palestinians due to Israel's assaults on Gaza, pro-Palestinian demonstrators urged the Paris 2024 International Olympic Committee to prohibit Israel's participation in the Olympics. Israeli athletes participating in the 2024 Paris Summer Olympics have encountered protests, death threats, and harassment as the events unfold amidst Israel's continuous military actions in Gaza and the worsening security conditions in the Middle East. French Interior Minister Gerald Darmanin stated that Israeli athletes are provided with round-the-clock security. Certain athletes, including Nurali Emomali from Tajikistan and Abderrahman Bouchita from Morocco, have declined to shake hands with Israel's Baruch Shamilov.

== Integration of Arab citizens in sports ==
Aside from football, there are few Arabs in elite levels of sport in Israel. Arab members of the Israel national football team include Rifat (Jimmy) Turk, Najwan Ghrayib, Walid Badir, Salim Toama, Abbas Suan. Another Israeli Arab, Johar Abu Lashin, born in Nazareth, was an IBO Welterweight champion.

== Olympic Games ==
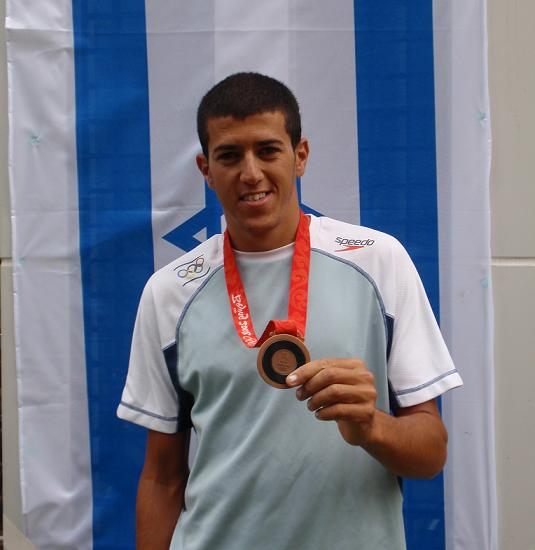
Shahar Tzuberi, windsurfer and Olympic bronze medalist

Israel has won thirteen Olympic medals. Gal Fridman won Israel's first Olympic gold medal at the 2004 Summer Olympics.

Games	Sport	Event	Medal	Name	Ref.
1992 Barcelona	Judo	Women's ‍–‍61 kg	Silver	Yael Arad	
1992 Barcelona	Judo	Men's ‍–‍71 kg	Bronze	Oren Smadja	
1996 Atlanta	Sailing	Men's Mistral One Design	Bronze	Gal Fridman	
2000 Sydney	Canoeing	Men's K-1 500 metres	Bronze	Michael Kolganov	
2004 Athens	Sailing	Men's Mistral One Design	Gold	Gal Fridman	
2004 Athens	Judo	Men's ‍–‍100 kg	Bronze	Ariel Ze'evi	
2008 Beijing	Sailing	Men's RS:X	Bronze	Shahar Tzuberi	
2016 Rio de Janeiro	Judo	Women's ‍–‍63 kg	Bronze	Yarden Gerbi	
2016 Rio de Janeiro	Judo	Men's +100 kg	Bronze	Or Sasson	
2020 Tokyo	Gymnastics	Men's floor	Gold	Artem Dolgopyat	
2020 Tokyo	Gymnastics	Women's rhythmic individual all-around	Gold	Linoy Ashram	
2020 Tokyo	Taekwondo	Women's ‍–‍49 kg	Bronze	Avishag Semberg	
2020 Tokyo	Judo	Mixed team	Bronze	Israel national judo team: Tohar Butbul; Raz Hershko; Li Kochman; Inbar Lanir; Sagi Muki; Shira Rishony; Baruch Shmailov; Timna Nelson-Levy; Peter Paltchik; Or Sasson; Gili Sharir	
2024 Paris	Sailing	Men's iQFoil	Gold	Tom Reuveny	
2024 Paris	Sailing	Women's iQFoil	Silver	Sharon Kantor	
2024 Paris	Gymnastics	Men's floor	Silver	Artem Dolgopyat	
2024 Paris	Gymnastics	Women's rhythmic group all-around	Silver	Ofir Shaham; Diana Svertsov; Adar Friedmann; Romi Paritzki; Shani Bakanov	
2024 Paris	Judo	Women's ‍–‍78 kg	Silver	Inbar Lanir	
2024 Paris	Judo	Women's +78 kg	Silver	Raz Hershko	
2024 Paris	Judo	Men's ‍–‍100 kg	Bronze	Peter Paltchik	

== Sports media ==
Television, radio, newspapers and news web sites discuss Israeli sports. In 2010, Israel sports radio, the country's first English-language all-sports talk radio station, was established, covering Israeli and American sports.

The main football leagues air on Sport 1, Sport 2 (both owned by Charlton Broadcasting Company) and Sport 5. Other sports channels include Eurosport and Fox Sports.

Facebook page, Follow Team Israel, shares the news of Israeli sport to the world.

== See also ==
- List of Jews in sports
- Krav maga
- Hapoel
- Maccabi World Union
- Israel at the 1970 Asian Games
