= List of golf courses designed by Pete Dye =

The following is a partial list of golf courses designed by Pete Dye. He is credited with designing more than 200 courses internationally during his lifetime. In 1982, Sports Illustrated wrote that Dye had a reputation for transforming "unpromising" land into picturesque and challenging golf courses, that required a style of play called "target golf".

- OD denotes courses for which Dye is the original designer
- R denotes courses reconstructed by Dye
- A denotes courses for which Dye made substantial additions
- E denotes courses that Dye examined and on the construction of which he consulted

Name	Contribution	Year built	City / Town	State / Province	Country	Comments
Ancala CC	OD		Scottsdale	Arizona	United States	
Red Mountain Ranch CC (Championship Course)	OD	1986	Mesa	Arizona	United States	
Carmel Valley Ranch GR	OD		Carmel Valley Ranch	California	United States	
La Quinta Resort and Club (Dunes Course, Mountain Course)	OD		La Quinta	California	United States	
Lost Canyons Golf Club (Shadow Course, Sky Course)	OD		Simi Valley	California	United States	Defunct
Mission Hills CC Pete Dye Course	OD		Rancho Mirage	California	United States	
PGA West (Stadium Course)	OD		La Quinta	California	United States	
The Citrus GC	OD		La Quinta	California	United States	
The Hideaway GC Pete Dye Course	OD		La Quinta	California	United States	
The Westin Mission Hills Resort & Spa (South Course)	OD		Rancho Mirage	California	United States	
Trump National GC - Los Angeles	OD		Rancho Palos Verdes	California	United States	
Copper Creek GC	OD	1997	Copper Mountain	Colorado	United States	
Glenmoor CC	OD		Cherry Hills Village	Colorado	United States	
Gypsum Creek GC	OD		Gypsum	Colorado	United States	
Plum Creek GC	OD		Castle Rock	Colorado	United States	
Riverdale Dunes	OD		Brighton	Colorado	United States	
The CC of Colorado	OD		Colorado Springs	Colorado	United States	
TPC River Highlands	OD		Cromwell	Connecticut	United States	
Wintonbury Hills GC	OD		Bloomfield	Connecticut	United States	
Amelia Island Plantation (Ocean Links)	OD		Amelia Island	Florida	United States	
Delray Dunes G&CC	OD		Boynton Beach	Florida	United States	
Gasparilla Inn GC	OD	2004	Boca Grande	Florida	United States	
Gulf Stream GC	R		Gulf Stream	Florida	United States	Pete and Alice Dye - 2014 Remodel
Harbor Course	OD		Grand Harbor, Vero Beach	Florida	United States	
Harbour Ridge Yacht & CC (River Ridge Course)	OD		Palm City	Florida	United States	
John's Island Club (North Course)	OD		Vero Beach	Florida	United States	Pete and Perry Dye design
John's Island Club (South Course)	OD		Vero Beach	Florida	United States	Pete Dye and Jack Nicklaus design
Medalist Golf Club	OD		Jupiter	Florida	United States	Pete Dye and Greg Norman design, redesign by Bobby Weed in 2015.
Old Marsh GC	OD		Palm Beach Gardens	Florida	United States	
Palm Beach Polo (The Cypress Course)	OD		Wellington	Florida	United States	
PGA Golf Club at the Reserve (Pete Dye Course)	OD		Port Saint Lucie	Florida	United States	
River Ridge GC (Harbour Ridge)	OD		Palm City	Florida	United States	Treasure Coast – Florida Golf Communities
Southern Hills Plantation Club	OD		Brooksville	Florida	United States	
St. Andrews Club	OD		Delray Beach	Florida	United States	
Talis Park GC	OD		Naples	Florida	United States	Pete Dye and Greg Norman design
The Dye Preserve GC	OD		Jupiter	Florida	United States	
The Moorings Club of Vero Beach	OD		Vero Beach	Florida	United States	
TPC at Sawgrass (Dye Valley Course)	OD	1987	Ponte Vedra Beach	Florida	United States	
TPC at Sawgrass (Stadium Course)	OD	1980	Ponte Vedra Beach	Florida	United States	
West Bay Club	OD		Estero	Florida	United States	Pete and P.B Dye design
The Dye Course at White Oak	OD	2017	Yulee	Florida	United States	Built by Allan MacCurrach
Atlanta National Golf Club	OD		Alpharetta	Georgia	United States	
Ogeechee Golf Club at the Ford Plantation	OD		Richmond Hill	Georgia	United States	
Oakwood CC	OD		Coal Valley	Illinois	United States	
Ruffled Feathers Golf Club	OD		Lemont	Illinois	United States	
Tamarack CC	OD		Shiloh	Illinois	United States	
Yorktown GC	OD		Belleville	Illinois	United States	
Crooked Stick GC	OD	1964	Carmel	Indiana	United States	
Dye's Walk CC	OD		Greenwood	Indiana	United States	formerly Eldorado CC and Royal Oak
Eagle Creek GC at Eagle Creek Park (Pines and Sycamore Courses)	OD		Indianapolis	Indiana	United States	
Forest Park GC	OD		Brazil	Indiana	United States	
Greenbelt GC	OD		Columbus	Indiana	United States	
Harbour Trees GC	OD		Noblesville	Indiana	United States	
Indianapolis Motor Speedway Brickyard Crossing GC	OD		Speedway	Indiana	United States	
Maple Creek G&CC	OD	1961	Indianapolis	Indiana	United States	The very first course designed by Pete (and Alice) Dye in 1961, originally named 'Heather Hills.
Birck Boilermaker Golf Complex at Purdue University (Ackerman-Allen Course, Kampen Course)	OD		West Lafayette	Indiana	United States	
Mystic Hills GC	OD		Culver	Indiana	United States	
Oak Tree GC	OD		Plainfield	Indiana	United States	Front nine
Plum Creek GC			Carmel	Indiana	United States	
Sahm GC	OD		Indianapolis	Indiana	United States	
The Bridgewater Club	OD		Westfield	Indiana	United States	
The Camferdam Golf Experience	OD		Indianapolis	Indiana	United States	The Indianapolis Children's Museum
The Club at Chatham Hills	OD		Westfield	Indiana	United States	Semi-private
The Club at Holliday Farms	OD		Zionsville	Indiana	United States	
The Fort GC	OD		Indianapolis	Indiana	United States	Fort Harrison State Park
The Pete Dye Course	OD		French Lick	Indiana	United States	
Woodland CC	OD		Carmel	Indiana	United States	
Des Moines G&CC	OD		West Des Moines	Iowa	United States	
Belle Terre CC	OD		LaPlace	Louisiana	United States	
TPC of Louisiana	OD		Avondale	Louisiana	United States	
Kearney Hill Golf Links	OD	1989	Lexington	Kentucky	United States	
Lexington CC	R	1961	Lexington	Kentucky	United States	
Peninsula GC	OD		Lancaster	Kentucky	United States	
Bulle Rock GC	OD		Havre de Grace	Maryland	United States	
Rum Pointe Seaside Golf Links	OD		Berlin	Maryland	United States	
The Links at Perry Cabin	OD		St. Michaels	Maryland	United States	formerly Harbourtowne Resort CC
Radrick Farms Golf Course at the University of Michigan	OD		Ann Arbor	Michigan	United States	
Wabeek CC	OD		Bloomfield Hills	Michigan	United States	
Boone Valley GC	OD		Augusta	Missouri	United States	
Old Hickory GC	OD		St. Peters	Missouri	United States	
Firethorn GC	OD		Lincoln	Nebraska	United States	
Desert Pines GC	OD		Las Vegas	Nevada	United States	
Paiute GC Resort	OD		Las Vegas	Nevada	United States	Snow Mountain, Sun Mountain, and Wolf Courses
Pound Ridge GC	OD		Pound Ridge	New York	United States	
Cardinal by Pete Dye	OD		Greensboro	North Carolina	United States	
CC of Landfall	OD		Wilmington	North Carolina	United States	
Founders GC	OD	1991	Southport	North Carolina	United States	
Oak Hollow GC	OD		High Point	North Carolina	United States	
Avalon Lakes	OD		Warren	Ohio	United States	
Fowler's Mill GC	OD		Chesterland	Ohio	United States	
Little Turtle GC	OD	1971	Westerville	Ohio	United States	
The Golf Club	OD		New Albany	Ohio	United States	
Oak Tree National (formerly Oak Tree Golf Club)	OD	1976	Edmond	Oklahoma	United States	
Oak Tree CC (East Course, West Course)	OD	1982	Edmond	Oklahoma	United States	
Montour Heights CC	OD		Coraopolis	Pennsylvania	United States	
Mystic Rock, Nemacolin Woodlands Resort	OD		Farmington	Pennsylvania	United States	
Colleton River Plantation Club (Dye Course)	OD		Bluffton	South Carolina	United States	
DeBordieu Club	OD	2000	Georgetown	South Carolina	United States	
Hampton Hall Club	OD		Bluffton	South Carolina	United States	
Harbour Town Golf Links	OD		Hilton Head Island	South Carolina	United States	
Heron Point	OD		Hilton Head Island	South Carolina	United States	formerly Sea Marsh
Kiawah Island Golf Resort (The Ocean Course)	OD		Kiawah Island	South Carolina	United States	
Long Cove Club	OD		Hilton Head Island	South Carolina	United States	
Prestwick CC	OD	1989	Myrtle Beach	South Carolina	United States	
The Dye Club at Barefoot Resort	OD	2000	North Myrtle Beach	South Carolina	United States	
Rarity Mountain GC	OD		Jellico	Tennessee	United States	
The Honors GC	OD		Ooltewah	Tennessee	United States	
AT&T Canyons Course of TPC at San Antonio	OD		San Antonio	Texas	United States	
Austin CC	OD		Austin	Texas	United States	
Stonebridge Ranch CC (The Dye Course)	OD		McKinney	Texas	United States	
The Stonebridge Ranch CC	OD		McKinney	Texas	United States	
Promontory Club	OD		Park City	Utah	United States	
Pete Dye River Course of Virginia Tech	R/A		Radford	Virginia	United States	
River Course at Kingsmill Resort	OD		Williamsburg	Virginia	United States	
Virginia Beach National	OD		Virginia Beach	Virginia	United States	
Virginia Oaks	OD		Gainesville	Virginia	United States	Closed (https://www.princewilliamtimes.com/news/shuttered-virginia-oaks-golf-course-could-become-nutrient-bank/article_becc2660-f091-11e7-9d01-7f115d673b74.html)
Pete Dye GC	OD		Clarksburg	West Virginia	United States	
Big Fish GC	OD	2004	Hayward	Wisconsin	United States	
Blackwolf Run (River Course, Meadows Valley Course)	OD		Kohler	Wisconsin	United States	
Whistling Straits (Irish Course, Straits Course)	OD	2000	Haven	Wisconsin	United States	
Mission Hills Dongguan (Pete Dye Course)	OD		Shenzhen	Guangdong	China	
Santa Barbara Beach Resort (Old Quarry GC)	OD		Willemstad	Kingdom of the Netherlands	Curaçao	
Teeth of the Dog, Dye Fore, The Links	OD	1971	Casa de Campo, La Romana	La Romana Province	Dominican Republic	
La Romana CC	OD		La Romana	La Romana Province	Dominican Republic	
Las Aromas GC	OD		Santiago de los Caballeros	Dominican Republic	Dominican Republic	
La Reunion Antigua Golf Resort (Fuego Maya GC)	OD	2008	Alotenango	Sacatepéquez	Guatemala	
Pristine Bay Resort (Black Pearl at Pristine Bay)	OD	2010	French Harbour, Roatán	Bay Islands	Honduras	
Caesarea G&CC	R/A		Caesarea	Haifa	Israel	
Franciacorta GC	OD		Franciacorta	Province of Brescia	Italy	
GC du Domaine Impérial	OD		Gland	Vaud	Switzerland	
Full Cry at Keswick Hall			Keswick	Virginia	United States	
