= Lindley =

Lindley may refer to:

== Places ==
Australia

- Lindley, South Australia, a locality

England

- Lindley, Leicestershire, England
  - site of RAF Lindley
- Lindley, North Yorkshire, England
- Lindley, West Yorkshire, a suburb of Huddersfield, England
- Old Lindley, West Yorkshire, England

South Africa

- Lindley, Free State, a town in South Africa
- Lindley, Gauteng, a sub place north of Johannesburg, South Africa

United States

- Lindley, Missouri, an unincorporated community
- Lindley, New York, a town in the United States

== People ==
- Lindley (surname)
- Lindley (given name)

== See also ==
- Linley (disambiguation)
