= Asher Iyasu =

Israeli golfer

Asher Iyasu (Hebrew: אשר איסו, Amharic: አሸር ያሱ; born in Ethiopia) is an Israeli golfer who was the first golfer to win the Caesarea Golf & Country Club's tournament from the Beta Israel community. His first real success came in a doubles tournament in which he won with a top blind golfer, Israel's only blind golfer, Zohar Sharon. The second was with the son of the famous writer Yigal Mossinson, Humi.
