= Lindley (given name) =

Lindley is a given name. Notable people with the name include:

== Men ==
- Lindley Beckworth (1913–1984), U.S. Representative from Texas
- Lindley Bothwell (1901–1986), American citrus grower and automobile collector
- Lindley DeVecchio (born 1940), former FBI agent
- Lindley Evans (1895–1982), Australian pianist and composer
- Lindley Fraser (1904–1963), Scottish broadcaster and economist
- Lindley Miller Garrison (1864–1932), American lawyer and U.S. Secretary of War
- Lindley H. Hadley (1861–1948), U.S. Representative from Washington State
- Lindley Murray Hoag (1808–1880), American Quaker missionary
- Lindley Jenkins (born 1954), English footballer
- Lindley Johnson (1854–1937), American architect
- Spike Jones (1911–1965), born Lindley Armstrong Jones, American musician and bandleader
- Spike Jones Jr. (born 1949 as Lindley Armstrong Jones Jr.), American television producer and director
- Lindley Murray Moore (1788–1871), American abolitionist and educator
- Lindley Murray (1745–1826), American lawyer and grammarian

== Women ==
- Lindley Darden (born 1945), American philosopher of science
- Lindley Naismith, New Zealand architect
- Lindley Winslow, American experimental nuclear and particle physicist, and associate professor

== See also ==
- Lindley (surname)
- Lindley (disambiguation)
