= Lindley (surname) =

Lindley is an English surname. Notable people with the surname include:

- Alfred Lindley (1904–1951), American lawyer and sportsman
- Audra Lindley (1918–1997), American actress
- Augustus Frederick Lindley (1840–1873), Royal Navy officer involved in the Taiping reform movement in China
- Butch Lindley (1948–1990), American NASCAR racer
- Charles Lindley (1865–1957), Swedish socialist and trade union activist
- David Lindley (musician) (1944–2023), American guitarist
- David Lindley (physicist) (born 1956), British theoretical physicist and author
- Debbie Lindley (born 1973), British TV presenter and journalist
- Dennis Lindley (1923–2013), British statistician
- Dick Lindley, English professional footballer
- Earl Lindley (1933–2012), Canadian professional football player
- Eric Lindley (born 1982), American artist, writer, and musician
- Fred Lindley (born 1878), English Labour Party politician, Member of Parliament (MP) for Rotherham 1923–31
- Fleetwood Lindley, the last surviving person to have viewed Abraham Lincoln's body
- Florence Lindley, British school headmistress
- Florrie Lindley, fictional character in British TV soap opera Coronation Street
- Sir Francis Lindley (1872–1950), British diplomat
- Harry Lindley Walters, Canadian politician
- Hilda Lindley, American environmentalist
- Howard Lindley (died 1972), Australian journalist and filmmaker
- Isaac Lindley (1904–1989), Peruvian businessman
- Jacob Lindley (1774–1857), first president of Ohio University
- James Lindley (born 1981), English footballer
- James Johnson Lindley (1822–1891), U.S. Representative from Missouri
- Jen Lindley, fictional character in American TV drama Dawson's Creek
- Jimmy Lindley (1935–2022), English jockey and broadcaster
- John Lindley (1799–1865), English botanist, gardener and orchidologist
- John Lindley (cinematographer) (born 1951), American cinematographer
- Jonathan Lindley (1756–1828), one of the original settlers of Orange County, Indiana
- Leta Lindley (born 1972), American professional golfer
- Louis Burton Lindley Jr., better known as the actor Slim Pickens
- Mark Lindley (born 1937), American musicologist and historian
- Maurice Lindley (1915–1994), English football player, coach and manager
- Nathaniel Lindley, Baron Lindley (1828–1921), English jurist, son of John Lindley
- Paul Lindley (born 1966), English businessman
- Richard Lindley (author) (born 1949), English author
- Robert Lindley (1776–1855), English cellist
- Ryan Lindley (born 1989), American footballer
- Simon Lindley (1948–2025), British organist, choirmaster, conductor and composer
- Siri Lindley (born 1969), American triathlete and coach
- Thomas Jefferson Lindley (1843–1915), American Civil War soldier, farmer and politician
- Tinsley Lindley (1865–1940), English footballer
- Trevard Lindley (born 1986), American footballer
- Walter C. Lindley (1880–1958), United States federal judge
- William Lindley (1808–1900), English civil engineer
- Sir William Heerlein Lindley (1853–1917), British civil engineer, son of William Lindley

== See also ==
- Lindley (given name)
