= Westfield, Indiana =

City in the United States

- City
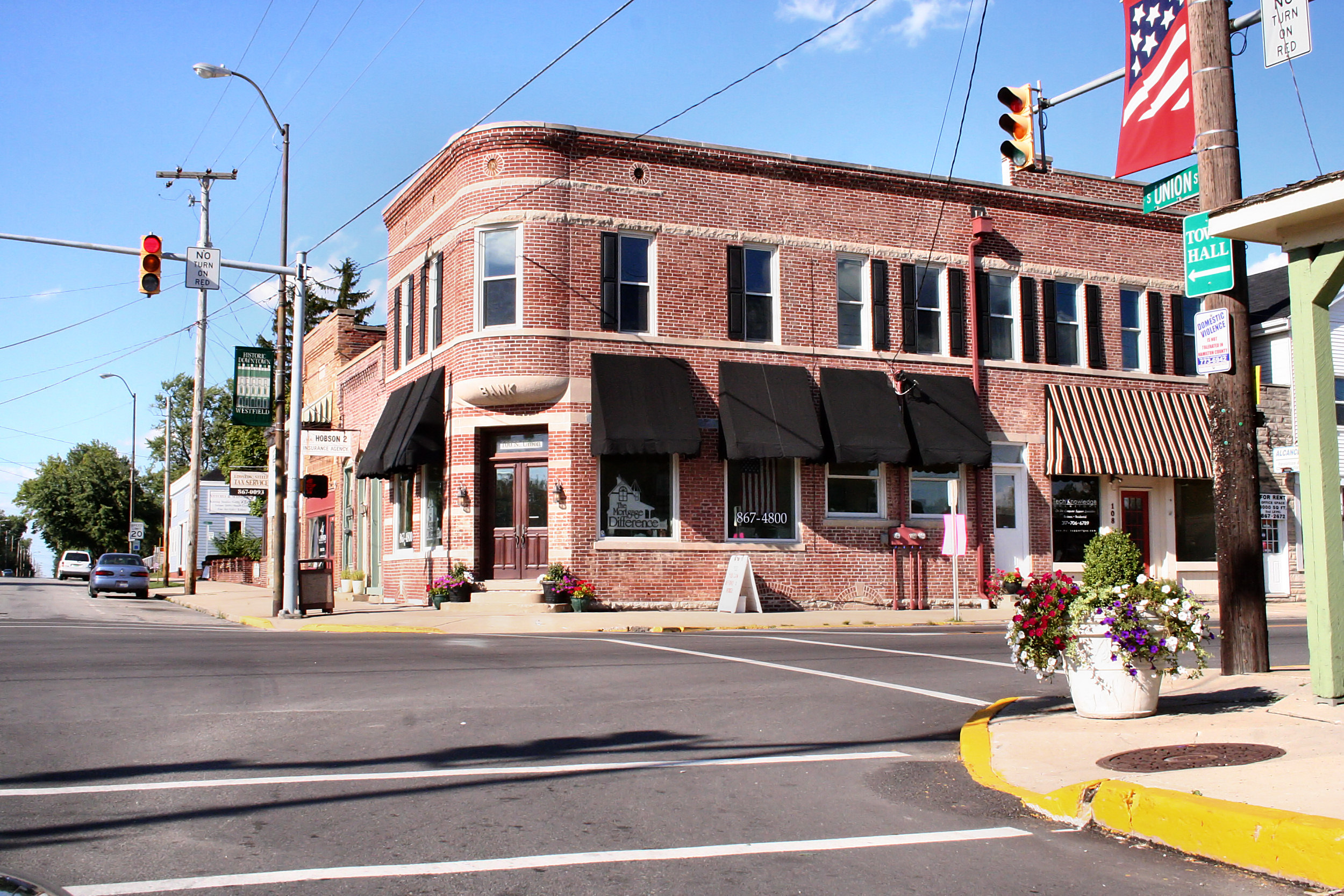
- Downtown Westfield in 2005

- Seal Icon
- Nickname: Crossroads of Indiana
- Location of Westfield in Hamilton County, Indiana.
- Coordinates: 40°01′56″N 86°09′11″W
- Country: United States
- State: Indiana
- County: Hamilton
- Township: Westfield Washington, Noblesville
- Established: 1834
- Incorporated (town): 1848
- Incorporated (city): January 1, 2008

Government
  - Mayor: Scott Willis (R)

Area
  - Total: 32.10 sq mi (83.14 km^{2})
  - Land: 31.88 sq mi (82.57 km^{2})
  - Water: 0.22 sq mi (0.57 km^{2})
- Elevation: 902 ft (275 m)

Population (2020)
  - Total: 46,410
  - Estimate (2023): 58,410
  - Density: 1,455.8/sq mi (562.08/km^{2})
- Time zone: UTC−5 (Eastern (EST))
  - Summer (DST): UTC−4 (EDT)
- ZIP codes: 46074, 46032 (part), 46033 (part), 46062 (part)
- Area code(s): 317, 463
- FIPS code: 18-82700
- GNIS feature ID: 2397735
- Website: westfieldin.gov

Westfield is a city in Hamilton County, Indiana, United States. It is a northern suburb of Indianapolis. As of 2025, the population was 64,407. Westfield is in the Indianapolis metropolitan area.

== History ==
Westfield was founded on May 6, 1834, by North Carolina Quakers Asa Bales, Ambrose Osborne, and Simon Moon. It is believed that the town was planned as a stop on the Underground Railroad with many families of the Religious Society of Friends and the Wesleyan Methodist Church supporting the cause. When the laws against aiding escaped slaves were made harsher, part of the Westfield Quaker Friends Meeting House split off into the Anti-Slavery Friends meeting.

Westfield was incorporated as a town in 1848.

On January 1, 2008, Westfield was incorporated as a city, and Andy Cook was sworn in as mayor. With recent annexations in southern Washington Township and rapid population growth in areas previously within the town limits, the city population in 2010 (30,068) was more than triple that of 2000 (9,293). Because of the growing size of the city, officials are planning a major revitalization of city's downtown. New additions to downtown Westfield are expected to include a new library and city hall.

The Union High Academy Historic District was listed on the National Register of Historic Places in 1995.

In 2014, the city opened Grand Park Sports Complex, which hosted the 2016 Big Ten Conference Men's Soccer Tournament.

== Demographics ==
Historical population
Census	Pop.	Note	%±
1850	1,738		—
1870	608		—
1880	350		−42.4%
1890	815		132.9%
1900	670		−17.8%
1910	700		4.5%
1920	574		−18.0%
1930	688		19.9%
1940	709		3.1%
1950	849		19.7%
1960	1,217		43.3%
1970	1,837		50.9%
1980	2,783		51.5%
1990	3,304		18.7%
2000	9,293		181.3%
2010	30,068		223.6%
2020	46,410		54.4%
2025 (est.)	66,258		42.8%
U.S. Decennial Census

=== 2025 Special Census ===
In 2025, the City of Westfield completed a special census conducted by the U.S. Census Bureau. As of September 15, 2025, Westfield had a population of 64,407 and 26,020 housing units. The results represented an increase from the city's 2020 census population of 46,410 and 17,548 housing units.

=== 2020 census ===
As of the 2020 census, Westfield had a population of 46,410. The median age was 36.4 years. 29.1% of residents were under the age of 18 and 11.7% of residents were 65 years of age or older. For every 100 females there were 96.0 males, and for every 100 females age 18 and over there were 92.0 males age 18 and over.

97.2% of residents lived in urban areas, while 2.8% lived in rural areas.

There were 16,638 households in Westfield, of which 41.7% had children under the age of 18 living in them. Of all households, 63.9% were married-couple households, 11.4% were households with a male householder and no spouse or partner present, and 19.8% were households with a female householder and no spouse or partner present. About 19.3% of all households were made up of individuals and 7.2% had someone living alone who was 65 years of age or older.

There were 17,548 housing units, of which 5.2% were vacant. The homeowner vacancy rate was 1.9% and the rental vacancy rate was 8.0%.

Racial composition as of the 2020 census
Race	Number	Percent
White	39,002	84.0%
Black or African American	1,515	3.3%
American Indian and Alaska Native	97	0.2%
Asian	1,537	3.3%
Native Hawaiian and Other Pacific Islander	29	0.1%
Some other race	1,307	2.8%
Two or more races	2,923	6.3%
Hispanic or Latino (of any race)	2,995	6.5%

=== 2010 census ===
As of the census of 2010, there were 30,068 people, 10,490 households, and 8,146 families residing in the town. The population density was 1,120.3 inhabitants per square mile (432.6/km^{2}). There were 11,209 housing units at an average density of 417.6 per square mile (161.2/km^{2}). The racial makeup of the town was 90.9% White, 2.2% African American, 0.2% Native American, 2.5% Asian, 2.6% from other races, and 1.6% from two or more races. Hispanic or Latino of any race were 5.8% of the population.

There were 10,490 households, of which 47.0% had children under the age of 18 living with them, 64.9% were married couples living together, 9.3% had a female householder with no husband present, 3.4% had a male householder with no wife present, and 22.3% were non-families. 18.0% of all households were made up of individuals, and 4.6% had someone living alone who was 65 years of age or older. The average household size was 2.85 and the average family size was 3.27.

The median age in the town was 33.7 years. 31.9% of residents were under the age of 18; 5.9% were between the ages of 18 and 24; 31.6% were from 25 to 44; 23.7% were from 45 to 64; and 6.8% were 65 years of age or older. The gender makeup of the town was 48.9% male and 51.1% female.

=== 2000 census ===
As of 2000 the median income for a household was $52,963; and for a family, $65,208. Males had a median income of $45,388; females, $26,864. The per capita income was $22,160. About 2.3% of families and 4.0% of the population were below the poverty line, including 2.5% of those under 18 years and 3.7% 65 years or over. The American Community Survey estimated the median household income in Westfield from 2007 to 2011 at $86,054 and the median family income at $96,374.

== Local media ==
Westfield is served by a local weekly newspaper, the Current in Westfield. The area is also served by the Times of Noblesville and the daily Hamilton County Reporter from the neighboring county seat of Noblesville.

== Grand Park ==
Grand Park is the largest youth sports campus in the United States, featuring 26 baseball and softball diamonds, 31 multipurpose fields for soccer, football, field hockey and lacrosse. An indoor events center opened in July 2016 that features three full-size multipurpose fields. Grand Park features an abundance of green space and more than 10 miles (16 km) of pedestrian/bicycle trails, including the largest trailhead on the Monon Corridor.

Since opening, the campus has hosted several major events including: Little League Softball and Baseball Region Tournaments, USA Archery Finals, Big Ten Women's and Men's Soccer Tournaments, US Club Soccer NPL Finals and Nationals, and NFL Flag Championships.

In 2017 Westfield signed a 10-year contract with the NFL's Indianapolis Colts for their annual training camp. 2026 will be the last year that the Indianapolis Colts practice at Grand Park.

The park averages over 5.5 million visits annually.

== Geography ==
Westfield is located in western Hamilton County. It is bordered to the east by Noblesville and to the south by Carmel. To the west it is bordered by Zionsville in Boone County.

U.S. Route 31 is the main highway through the city, leading north 31 miles (50 km) to Kokomo and south 9 miles (14 km) to Interstate 465, the beltway around Indianapolis. Downtown Indianapolis is 20 miles (32 km) south of the center of Westfield. Indiana State Road 32 is Westfield's Main Street and leads east 6 miles (10 km) to Noblesville, the county seat, and west 18 miles (29 km) to Lebanon.

According to the 2010 census, Westfield has a total area of 27.081 square miles (70.14 km^{2}), of which 26.84 square miles (69.52 km^{2}) (or 99.11%) is land and 0.241 square miles (0.62 km^{2}) (or 0.89%) is water.

== Notable people ==
- Herb Baumeister, suspected serial killer
- Claude Bowers, writer, Democratic politician, and ambassador to Spain and Chile
- Joey Chestnut, competitive eater
- Martha Doan, chemist and academic
- Thomas Jefferson Lindley, Civil War veteran, Indiana state representative and senator
- Ryan Pepiot, Major League Baseball pitcher (Los Angeles Dodgers, Tampa Bay Rays), Westfield High School graduate
- Kevin Plawecki, Major League Baseball catcher (Boston Red Sox), Westfield High School graduate
- Seth Cook Rees, pastor and leading figure in the evangelical Holiness movement
- Braden Smith, 2022 Indiana Mr. Basketball, Purdue Boilermakers basketball, 2024 1st Team All Big Ten, 2025 Big Ten Player of the Year
- Ambrose J. Tomlinson, first general overseer of the Church of God
- Eriq Zavaleta, professional soccer player (Toronto FC)

== Education ==
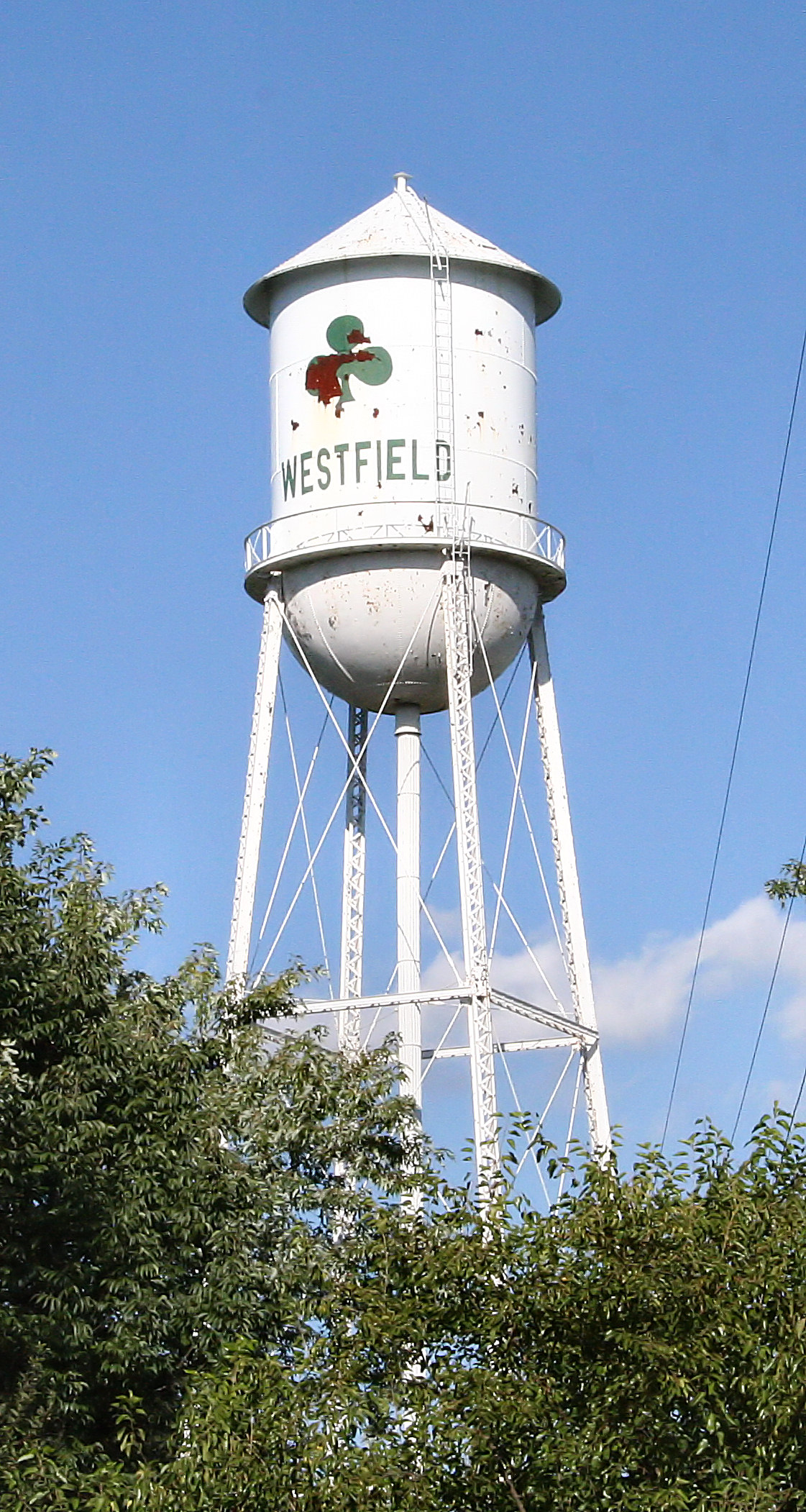
Westfield water tower. This tower was torn down and replaced with another, newer tower outside of downtown.

=== Public ===
- Westfield High School (Grades 9–12)
- Westfield Middle School (Grades 6–8)
- Cool Creek Elementary School (Grades K—5)
- Carey Ridge Elementary School (Grades K–5)
- Maple Glen Elementary School (Grades K–5)
- Monon Trail Elementary School (Grades K–5)
- Oak Trace Elementary School (Grades K–5)
- Shamrock Springs Elementary School (Grades K–5)
- Washington Woods Elementary School (Grades K–5)
- Virginia F. Wood Early Learning Center (Grades PreK-PreK)

=== Private ===
- Montessori School of Westfield
- St Maria Goretti School (Grades PreK–8)
- Union Bible College and Academy
- Options Charter School(Grades 7–12)

=== Colleges and universities ===
- Union Bible College and Seminary

=== Public library ===
The city has a lending library, the Westfield-Washington Public Library.

== Sports ==
Westfield has a contract with the NFL's Indianapolis Colts to host their yearly training Camp at the Grand Park Sports Campus. This began in 2018. Grand Park is also home to Indy Eleven's headquarters.

In November 2024, LIV Golf announced Westfield as the host location for the 2025 LIV Golf Individual Championship. The Club at Chatham Hills was selected as the venue, and the event took place August 15–17, 2025. The 2026 LIV Golf Individual Championship is scheduled to return to Chatham Hills on August 20–23, 2026.
