= Union Bible College and Academy =

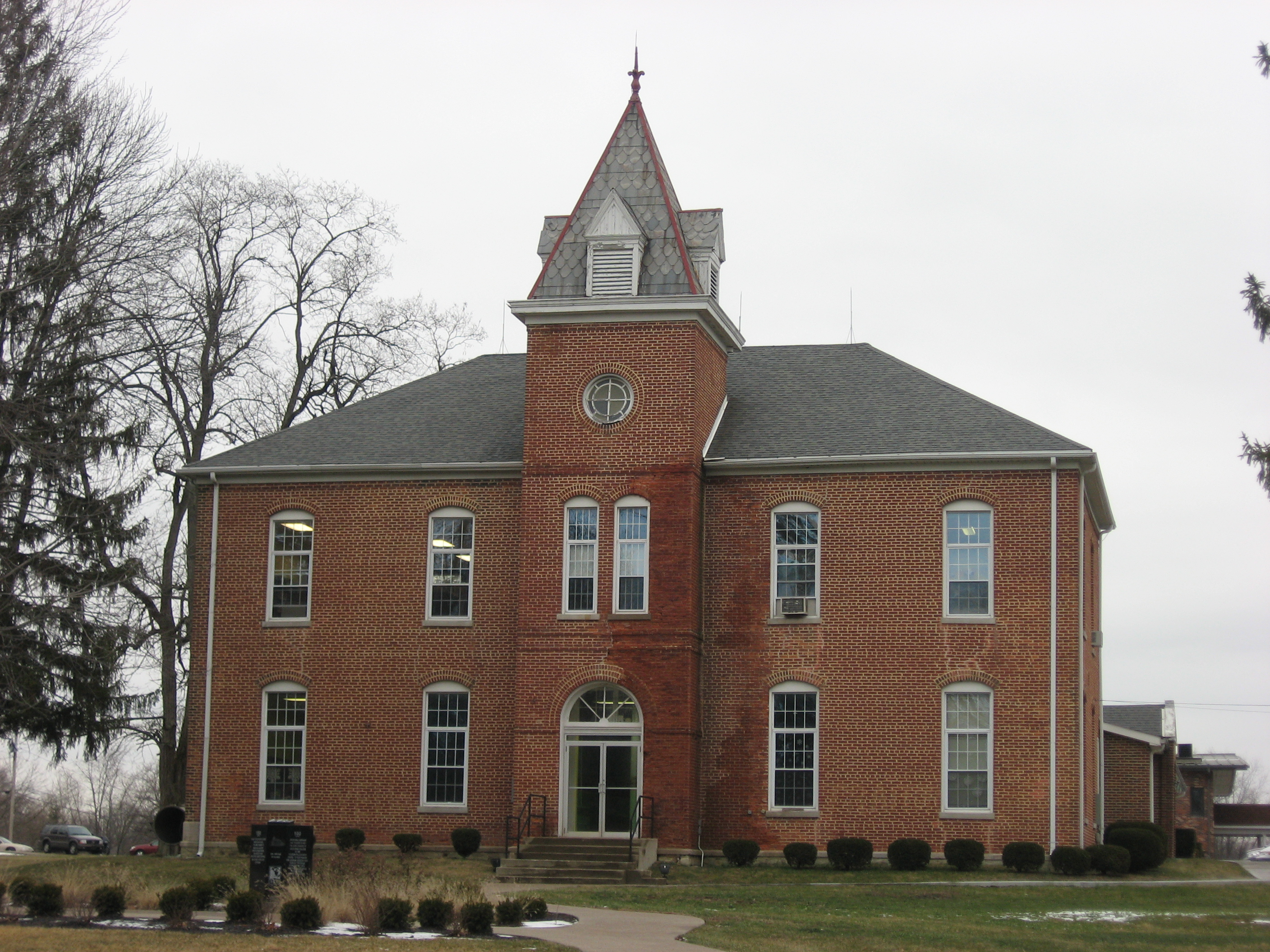
- Union Bible College and Academy
- Motto: Changing the World with the Unchanging Word!
- Type: Private high school and college
- Established: 1861
- Religious affiliation: Interdenominational, with historic ties to the Central Yearly Meeting of Friends
- President: Dr. C. Adam Buckler
- Location: Westfield, Indiana, United States
- Campus: 12.5 acres in the heart of downtown Westfield, Indiana
- Colors: blue, gold, and white
- Website: ubca.org

Union Bible College and Academy is a private, Christian educational institution combining a KG-12 academy and college in Westfield, Indiana. It was founded in 1861 by the Religious Society of Friends (Quakers), receiving patronage from the Central Yearly Meeting and being aligned with the conservative holiness movement. It was listed on the National Register of Historic Places in 1995.

== History ==
In 1860, members of the Religious Society of Friends (Quakers), concerned about the spiritual and academic upbringing of their children in light of the American Civil War, constructed a two-story brick building that came to be known as Union High School. It went into operation on January 7, 1861.

At the turn of the twentieth century, amid waning enrollment due to the advent of public schools in the area, a Quaker minister named William M. Smith was approached by the school committee to expand the operations of the campus. They wanted to incorporate training programs for aspiring ministers and missionaries. Smith accepted the offer and founded Union Bible Seminary in May 1911.

In 1980, both the seminary and academy assumed an interdenominational status. In June 1989, the seminary was renamed as Union Bible College & Academy.

== Accreditation ==
Union Bible College is accredited by the Association for Biblical Higher Education. Union Bible Academy is accredited by the American Association of Christian Schools.

== Campus ==
- Union Bible College & Academy
- U.S. National Register of Historic Places
- U.S. Historic district
- Location within Indiana Location within the United States
- Location: 434 S. Union St., Westfield, Indiana
- Coordinates: 40°2′19″N 86°7′34″W
- Area: 12.5 acres (5.1 ha)
- Built: 1861-1929
- Architectural style: Greek Revival, Tudor Revival, Bungalow/craftsman
- NRHP reference No.: 95000209
- Added to NRHP: March 3, 1995

Union Bible College & Academy is a private, Christian academic institution including an academy and college, as well as a national historic district located at Westfield, Hamilton County, Indiana. It encompasses five contributing buildings built between 1861 and 1929. They are the Greek Revival / Italianate style main classroom building (1861, 1883, 1946, 1953); Greek Revival style President's House (Estes House, 1861), a frame dormitory (1929), and two brick dormitories (c. 1861) that are now private homes.
