= Martha Doan =

American chemist and academic (1872–1960)

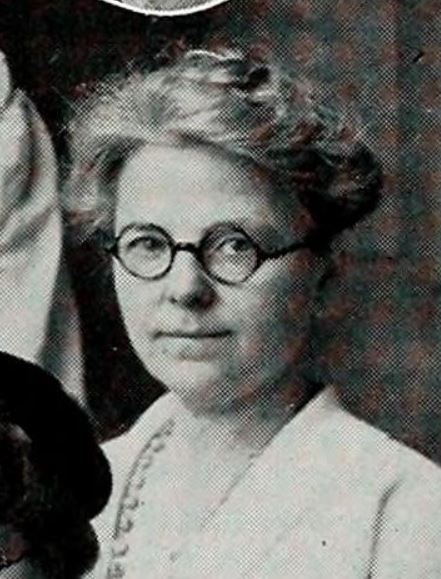
- Born: June 6, 1872
- Died: April 18, 1960 (aged 87)
- Education: Purdue University Earlham College in English Literature Cornell University
- Parents: Abel Doan (father); Pheobe MacPherson (mother)

Martha Doan (June 6, 1872 – April 18, 1960) was an American chemist whose contributions include research in compounds of thallium, three published work, and tenure as a professor and dean at various institutions in the US. Throughout her lifetime, she received four degrees, a B.S. and master's from Purdue, a B.L. from Earlham College, and a Sc.D. from Cornell. She was a dean of women for two colleges, Earlham College and Iowa Wesleyan College. In addition to her involvement in higher education, she was involved with several national organizations that involved chemistry and science. She was awarded a certificate for Outstanding Service to Science in 1951. There is now a garden dedicated to her in her hometown of Westfield, Indiana, in honor of her interests in science, nature, and horticulture.

== Early life ==
Born to Pheobe MacPherson and Abel Doan, Martha grew up in Westfield, Indiana. She was the oldest of seven children. Martha graduated from Union High School, a Quaker school. After high school, Martha decided to pursue a college education.

== Education and career ==
Martha Doan would eventually hold 4 collegiate level degrees. She earned her B.S. at age 19, from Purdue University. Her next year of study would be directed at the pursuit of a B.L. from Earlham College in English Literature. Afterwards, she received an M.S. from Purdue.

Her final degree came from Cornell University. During her time at Cornell, she pursued a Doctorate of Science (Sc.D.) in chemistry. Her studies were funded by the Henry W. Sage Fellowship offered to select graduate students at Cornell. Her work towards this advanced chemistry degree revolved around the research of thallium and related compounds. In 1896, the year that she received her Sc.D., she was listed as a co-author for a paper regarding the thallium related compounds, that would be published by the American Chemical Society. She was the first woman to receive a doctoral degree in chemistry from Cornell.

Another publication of Martha Doan's is the Index to Literature of Thallium 1861-1896. This index was unanimously recommended to the Smithsonian Institution by a committee from the American Association for the Advancement of Science. It would go on to appear in Miscellaneous Collections at the Smithsonian Institution in 1899. Her last publication was a translation of Radio Indicators and other selected topics in Inorganic Chemistry.

In addition to being a published chemist, Martha Doan taught for a majority of her life. Her first job in teaching was at Manual Training High School, in Indianapolis. She was then offered a position at Vassar College, where she taught as an instructor for 14 years. After teaching at Vassar College, she went on to be both a professor and dean of women at Earlham College. She stayed at Earlham until 1926. Three years later, she became a professor and dean of women for Iowa Wesleyan College and held this position until 1937. Her pursuits as an administrator included further developing strong teaching, research, and university extension work.

== Recognition, honors and awards ==
Her dedication to science and academia earned her several honors and awards from various institutions:

Recognition, Honors and Awards
| Title | Institution |
|---|---|
| Sage Fellow | Cornell University |
| Honorary Doctorate | Purdue University |
| Alumnae Citation Award | Earlham College |
| Certificate for Outstanding Service to Science | Graduate Women in Science |
| Fellow | Indiana Academy of Science |
| Member | National Association of Dean's of Women |
| Member | American Association of University Women |
