= Thomas Jefferson Lindley =

American politician

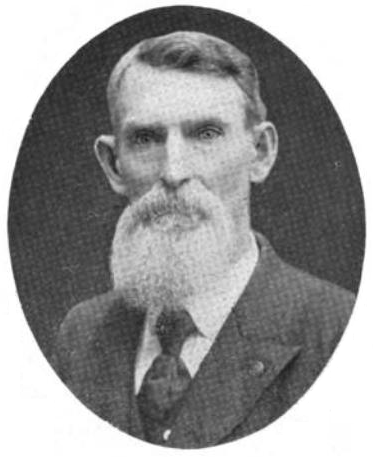

Member of the Indiana Senate
- In office 1900–1904

Member of the Indiana House of Representatives
- In office 1878–1882

Personal details
- Born: October 7, 1843 Westfield, Indiana, US
- Died: September 20, 1915 (aged 71) Noblesville, Indiana, US
- Party: Republican
- Spouse: Harriet J. Blair (m. 1867)
- Children: 4
- Occupation: Farmer, politician

Thomas Jefferson Lindley (October 7, 1843 – September 20, 1915) was a 19th-century Hoosier.

== Biography ==
Thomas Jefferson Lindley was born on a farm near Westfield, Indiana on October 7, 1843. His family were early settlers in a part of America newly opened up for settlement, because of the creation of the North West Territory. A large portion of the early citizens of Westfield, arrived to the frontier, having left South Carolina with hopes of avoiding the practice of slavery. His family were Quakers and strongly opposed to slavery, which led his father Aaron Lindley to become a leader in the anti-slavery movement. The Underground Railroad had supporters in the Westfield community, the Lindley family helped slaves escape to freedom in Canada. The younger Lindley laid aside his Quaker tradition in order to join the Civil War. He signed up for three campaigns and served with honor. He enrolled in Boxley, Indiana on October 25, 1861, aged 18 years old. He served in Regiment 57 Company H. He was discharged ranked as Sergeant on August 3, 1863.

After the war Lindley returned to the country life of farming. His first experience with public service began when he became the sheriff of Hamilton County, Indiana, at the age of 26. He married Harriet J. Blair on November 28, 1867, and they had two sons and two daughters. He was a member of the Grand Army of the Republic, the Masons, and the Knights of Pythias.

A Republican, he was elected to the Indiana House of Representatives for two terms, serving from 1878 to 1892, and to the State Senate in 1900. He nominated Charles Warren Fairbanks for re-election to the US Senate. Fairbanks went on to become the Vice President during Theodore Roosevelt's presidency. After public service Lindley always returned to his beloved country life on the farm and homestead.

While serving in state government he became friends with the famous Hoosier poet James Whitcomb Riley. The two men discovered they shared the same birth day. Also, both men were named after famous Americans, Riley after an Indiana governor, Lindley after a founding father and president. Riley shared some birthday celebrations with the Lindley family, at their Westfield residence.

His father built the first brick home in Washington Township, at the Lindley homestead on Lindley Hill. The bricks were made and fired on the property in a "one-time-use" kiln used in the brick making process of the era. The homestead remains today in the family, it can be seen along U.S. 31.

Thomas Jefferson Lindley died in Noblesville, Indiana on September 20, 1915.
