= Zohar Sharon =

Israeli golfer and former Paralympic goalball player

Zohar Sharon (Hebrew: זוהר שרון, born 1952) is a blind Israeli golfer who won titles in Israel as well as Europe. He is also a former Paralympic goalball player who competed for Israel at three Summer Paralympic Games.

== Biography ==
Zohar Sharon lost his sight in a chemical accident while serving in the Israel Defense Forces. Following the accident, Sharon began art therapy. He went on to study painting at the prestigious Avni Institute of Art in Tel Aviv and produced work of impressive quality. He was also a member of the national goalball team and participated in the 1980, 1988 and 1992 Summer Paralympics.

In 2003, he won the World Invitational blind golf tournament in Scotland. His first real domestic success came in a doubles tournament in which he won with a top Ethiopian golfer, Israel's only Ethiopian golfer, Asher Iyasu.
