= Lost Canyons Golf Club =

Golf facility in Simi Valley, California

- Interactive map of Lost Canyons Golf Club
- 34.313713°N 118.733695°W

Club information
- Location: Simi Valley, California
- Established: 2001
- Type: Public
- Tota holes: 36

Shadow Course
- Designed by: Fred Couples/Pete Dye
- Par: 72
- Length: 7005
- Course rating: 75.0

Sky Course
- Designed by: Fred Couples/Pete Dye
- Par: 72
- Length: 7285
- Course rating: 75.6

Lost Canyons Golf Club was a public golf facility located in Simi Valley, California. It had two 18-hole golf courses named Sky and Shadow.

Both courses were designed by Pete Dye with consulting help from Fred Couples, and were named "Top 10 Best New Courses" by Golf Magazine (2001 Sky and 2002 Shadow). The golf club was developed by Landmark Land Co. Inc, a leading developer of golf resort and residential communities.

Course designer and architect Dye reportedly remarked about the site, "Lost Canyons is the most majestic property I’ve ever had to work with. Nothing comes close."

Lost Canyons Golf Club suffered from several natural disasters over the years because of its topography and proximity to natural dry-brush. It was the victim of a wild fire that caused the destruction of many wood bridges and floods from heavy-rains that also took out the very same bridges that had been replaced.

The course closed in June 2016. In 2020, approval was granted for the development of 364 homes on the former course.
