= Caesarea Golf Club =

Golf club in Israel

Coordinates: 32.501655°N 34.906998°E

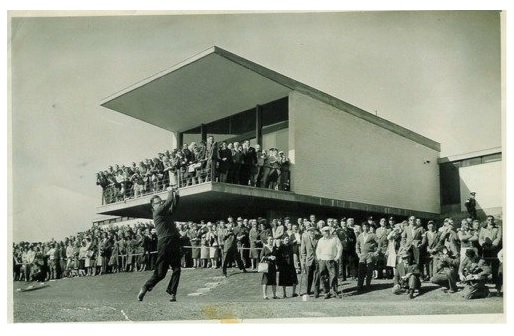
Minister Abba Eban in the opening of Caesarea's golf course

The Caesarea Golf Club was established in January 1961 by the Rothschild family.

== Past and present ==
When James Armand de Rothschild visited the Roman ruins in Caesarea, they reminded him of the golf courses back in Scotland, and as a veteran golfer he decided to build a golf course in Caesarea.

De Rothschild died before he could realize his vision, and after his death the James de Rothschild Foundation was established to fulfill his dream. The Foundation appointed the British representative of the family, Max Rowe, to turn the dream into reality. He organized a special committee whose members included, among others, the mayor of Jerusalem Teddy Kollek, the Director General of the Ministry of Tourism, Meir de Shalit, and the Foreign Minister at the time, Abba Eban, who headed the committee. The committee commissioned the architect Fred Smith. After design difficulties and efforts to find suitable grass that could withstand the Middle-Eastern climate, the course was built and an irrigation system that included an underground network of pipes was installed.

The committee set out to draft golfers and to promote the sport in Israel and the golf course abroad. The opening ceremony, in January 1961, was attended by prominent politicians.

The “Israel Golf Federation” was established in 1965, four years after the opening of the golf club.

The Club was renovated and upgraded several times over the years, as systems were replaced and modernized, requiring huge financial resources. In 1980, after a new irrigation system was installed at a cost of millions of Israeli shekels, the members convened a general meeting to petition Edmond de Rothschild to increase the annual subsidy for the club. He rejected the demand and transferred management of the club to the Caesarea Development Corporation.

Among the visitors to the club have been Sean Connery, Kirk Douglas, Frank Sinatra, and Danny Kaye. Notable Israeli figures included Chaim Herzog, who were members. Laetitia Beck took her first steps as a golfer at the Caesarea Golf Course, and it was in Caesarea that her parents, avid golfers, made their home. In 2008 Laetitia was chosen as one of Israel’s “sportswomen of the decade” as part of the State of Israel’s 60th anniversary celebrations.

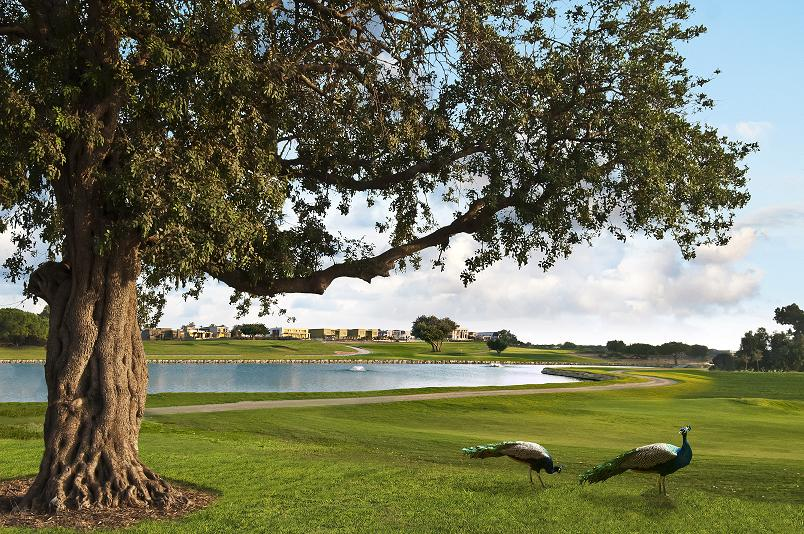
hole no. 7

The golf course was reopened in 2009, after it was completely redesigned and renovated by architect Pete Dye. As a passionate supporter of environmentally-friendly golf courses, Dye planned the course based on environmental and landscape preservation values. In 2010 the Caesarea golf course joined the list of the Rolex World's Top 1000 Golf Courses.

The club now spans 6750 sq/m and has two golf courses: a professional 18-hole course, the only one in Israel that meets international standards, and another 9-hole course used mainly for practice and for learning the game. Since 1961 the Club hosts the Maccabiah Games once every four years.

== See also ==
- Sports in Israel
- Tourism in Israel
