= List of Slovenian sportspeople =

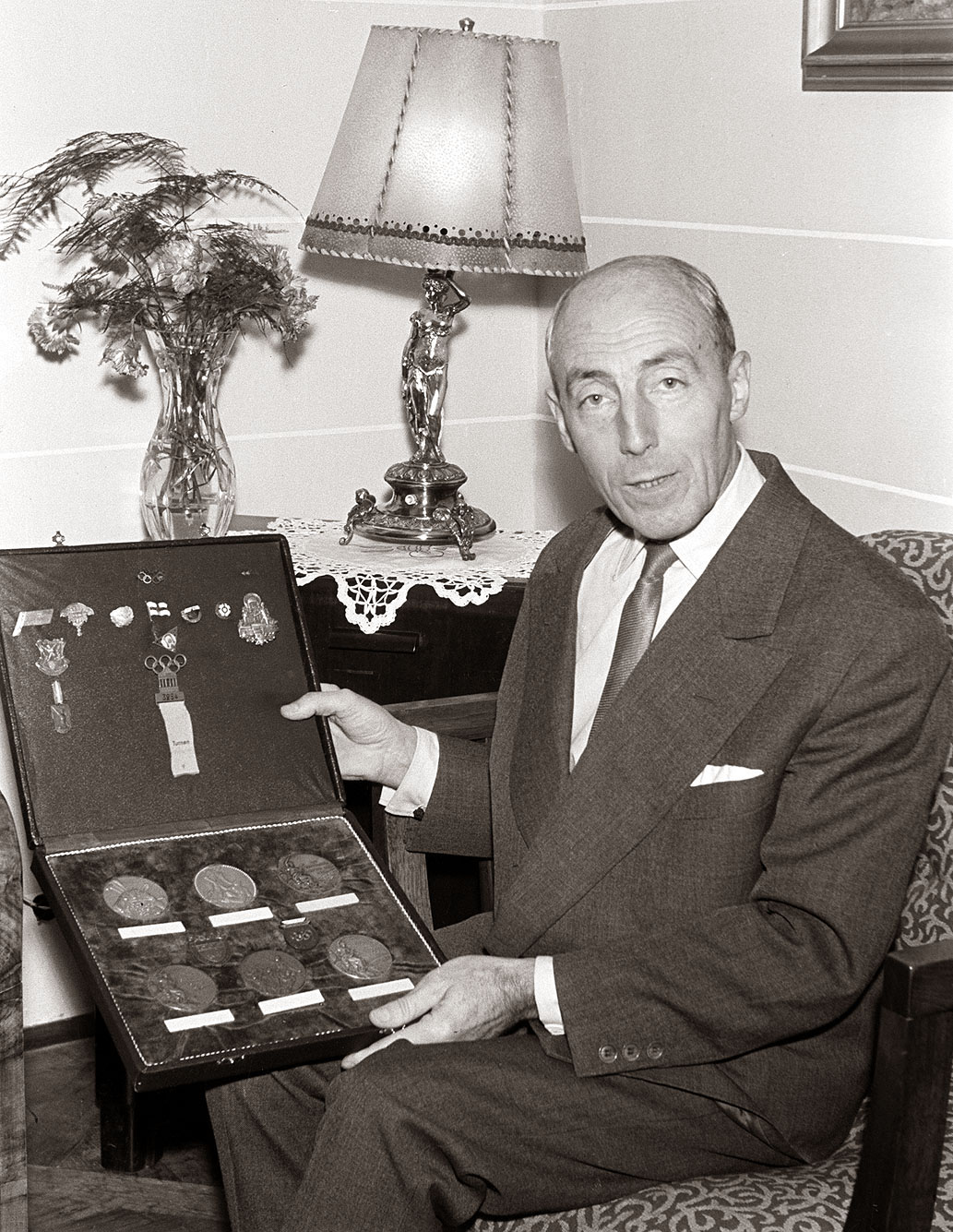
Leon Štukelj, the most successful Slovenian sportsman

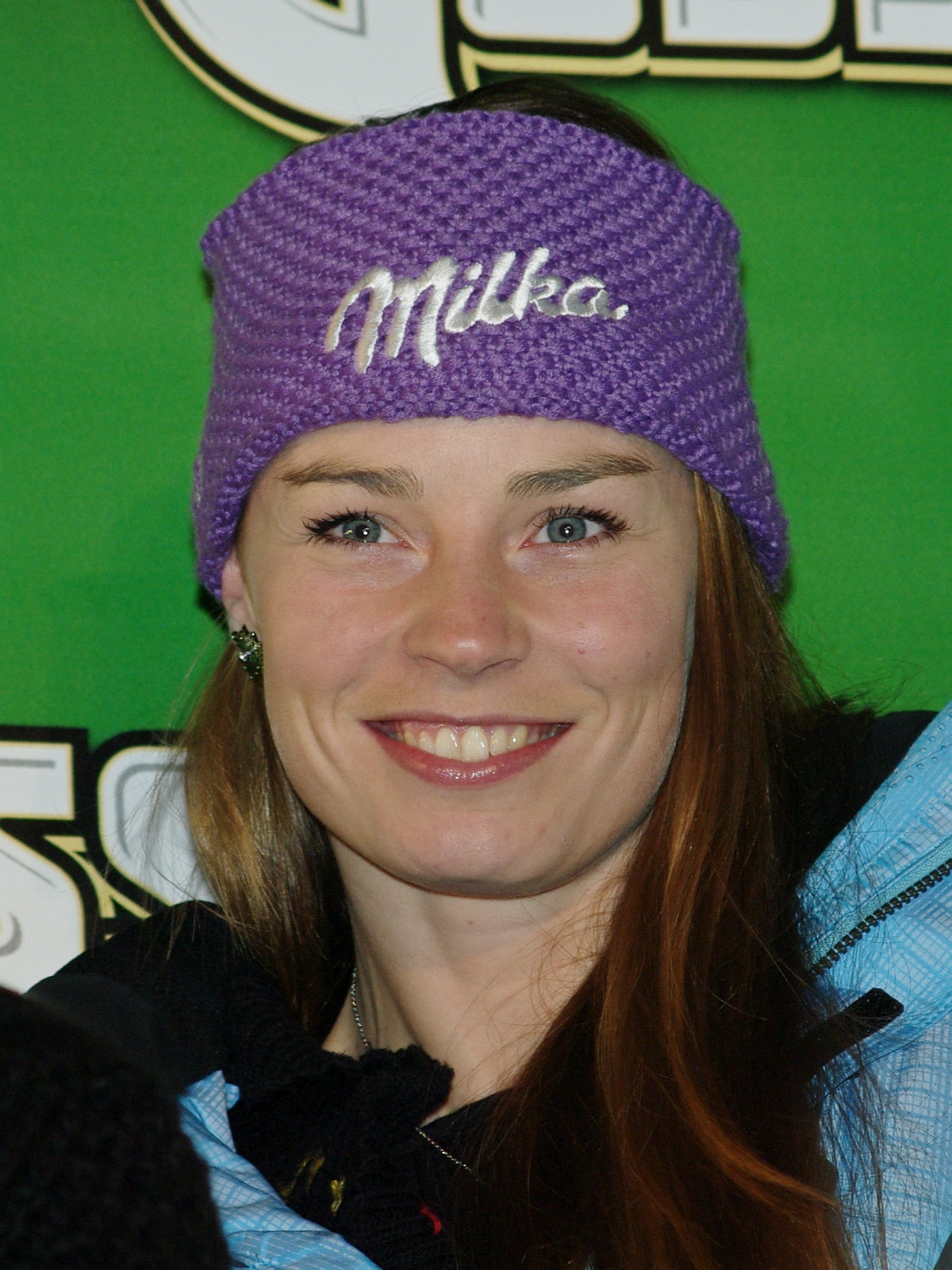
Tina Maze, the most successful Slovenian sportswoman

This is a partial list of Slovenian sportspeople. For the full plain list of Slovenian sportspeople on Wikipedia, see Category:Slovenian sportspeople.

== Alpine skiing ==
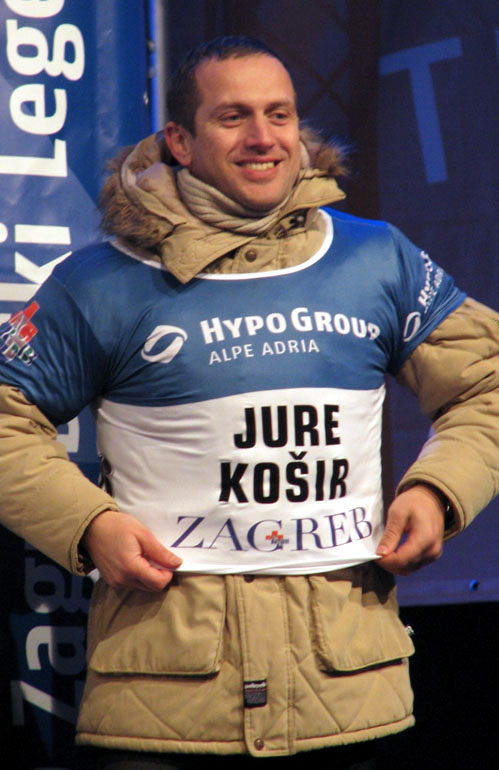
Jure Košir

- Nataša Bokal
- Tomaž Čižman
- Alenka Dovžan
- Jure Franko
- Meta Hrovat
- Urška Hrovat
- Andrej Jerman
- Katja Koren
- Jure Košir
- Mitja Kunc
- Bojan Križaj
- Tina Maze
- Rok Petrovič
- Špela Pretnar
- Boris Strel
- Mateja Svet

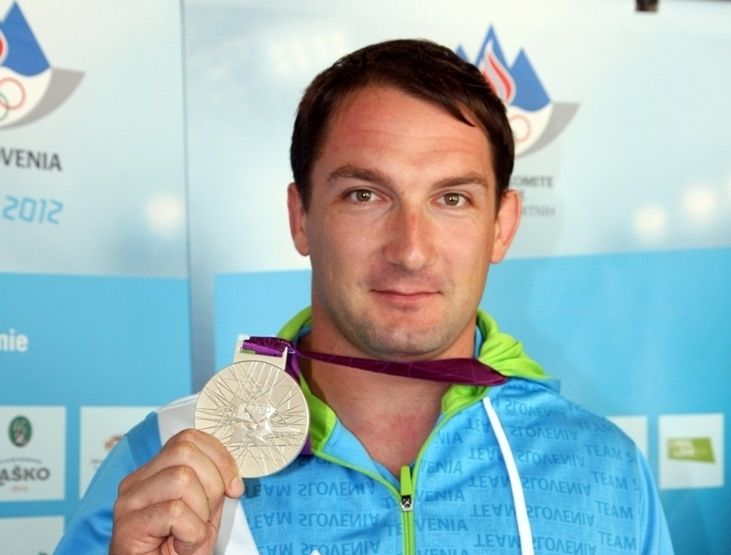
Primož Kozmus

== Archery ==
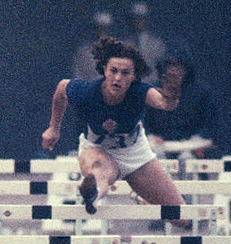
Draga Stamejčič

- Gregor Rajh
- Dejan Sitar
- Klemen Štrajhar

== Athletics ==
- Britta Bilač
- Borut Bilač
- Alenka Bikar
- Brigita Bukovec
- Gregor Cankar
- Jolanda Čeplak
- Primož Kozmus
- Brigita Langerholc
- Stanko Lorger
- Matic Osovnikar
- Merlene Ottey
- Martina Ratej
- Sonja Roman
- Marija Šestak
- Draga Stamejčič
- Nataša Urbančič

== Badminton ==
- Jasmina Keber
- Maja Tvrdy

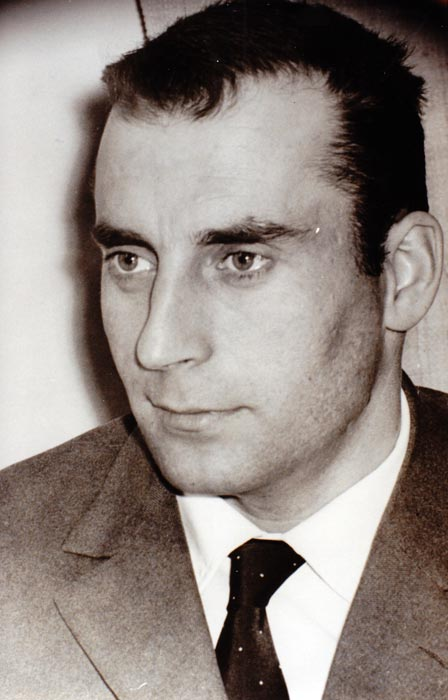
Ivo Daneu

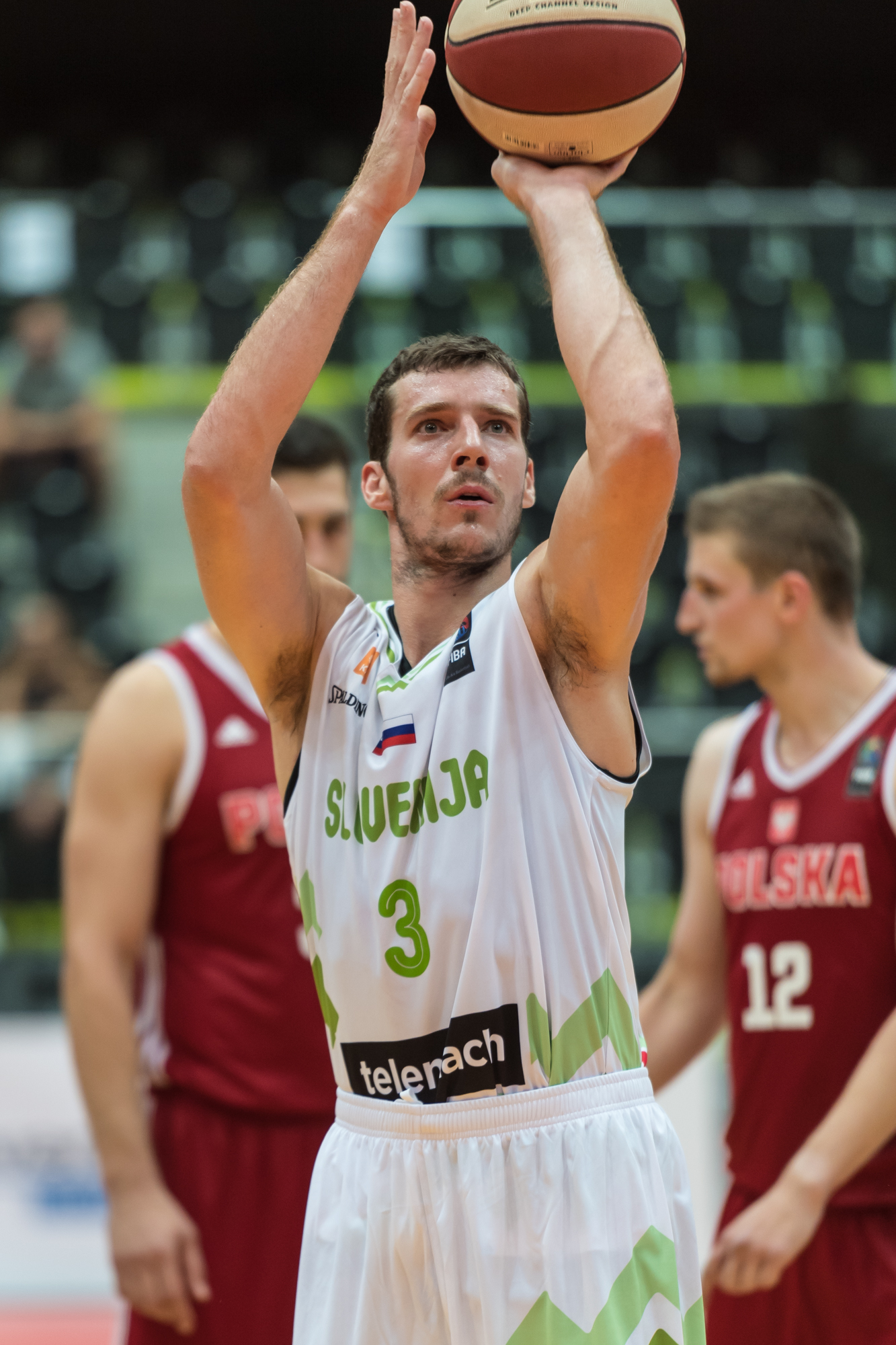
Goran Dragić

== Basketball ==
- Nika Barič
- Sani Bečirović
- Ivo Daneu
- Luka Dončić
- Goran Dragić
- Vinko Jelovac
- Jaka Lakovič
- Erazem Lorbek
- Marko Milič
- Boštjan Nachbar
- Radoslav Nesterović
- Matjaž Smodiš
- Beno Udrih
- Peter Vilfan
- Sasha Vujačić
- Jure Zdovc
- Aljoša Žorga
- Miha Zupan

== Biathlon ==
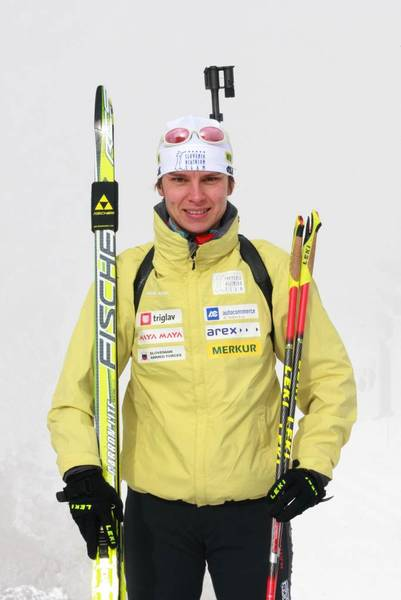
Teja Gregorin

- Klemen Bauer
- Jakov Fak
- Teja Gregorin
- Andreja Grašič
- Tomas Globočnik
- Andreja Mali
- Janez Marič

== Boxing ==
- Dejan Zavec

== Canoeing ==
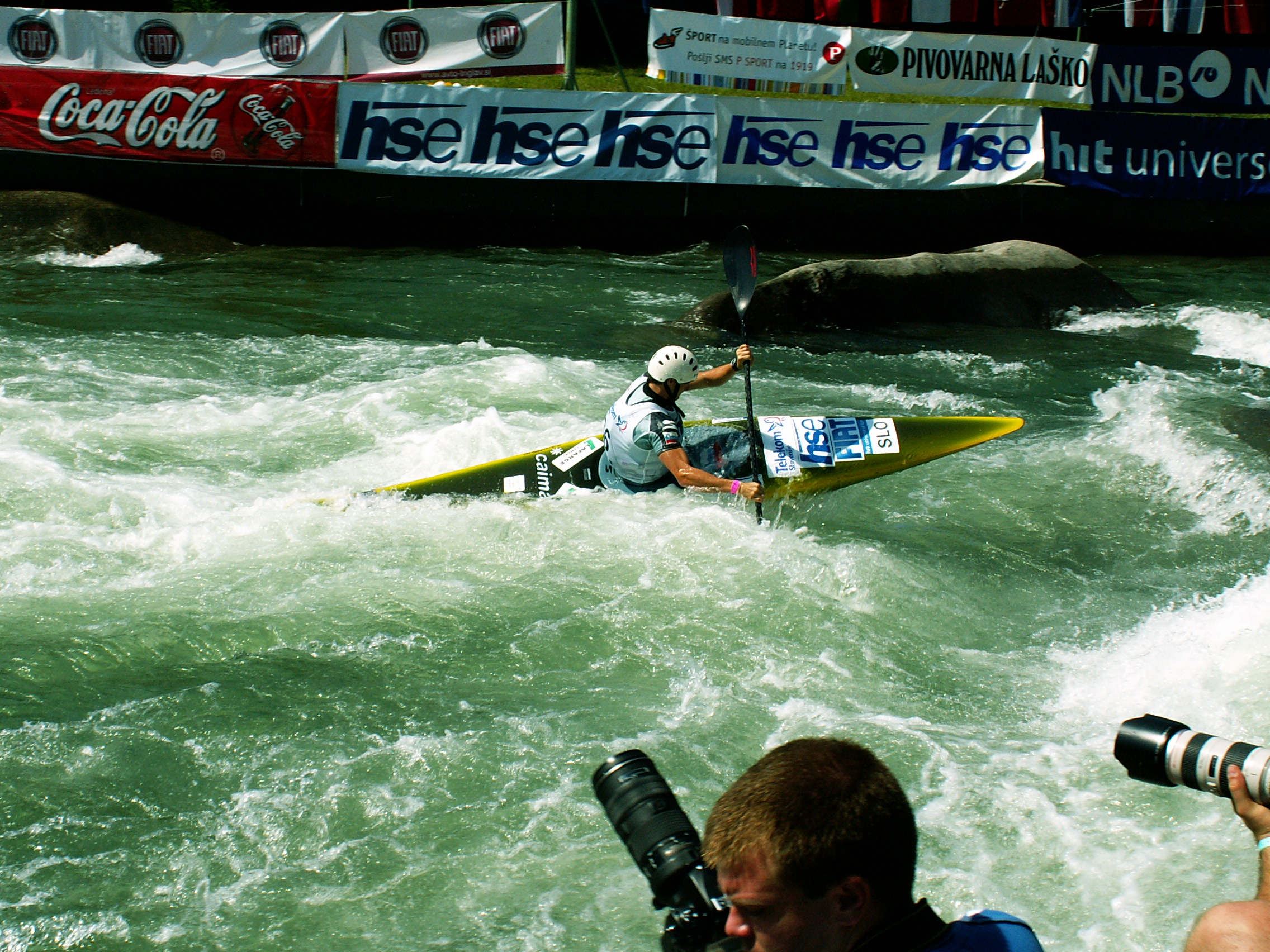
Peter Kauzer

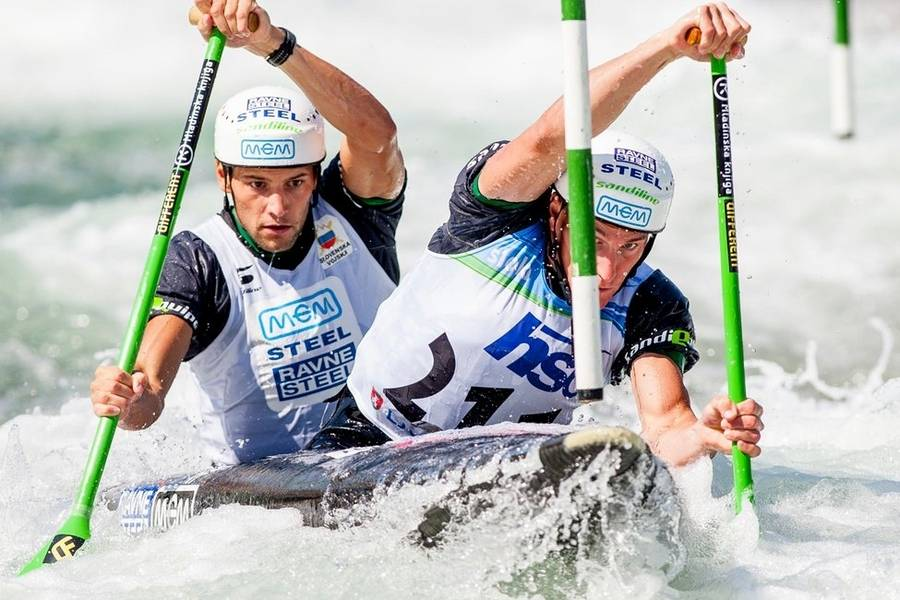
Luka Božič and Sašo Taljat

- Jernej Abramič
- Dare Bernot
- Natan Bernot
- Luka Božič
- Simon Hočevar
- Jože Ilija
- Andrej Jelenc
- Peter Kauzer
- Urša Kragelj
- Jure Meglič
- Ajda Novak
- Špela Ponomarenko Janić
- Benjamin Savšek
- Marjan Štrukelj
- Sašo Taljat
- Eva Terčelj
- Miha Terdič
- Andraž Vehovar
- Jože Vidmar
- Milan Zadel

== Climbing ==
- Janja Garnbret
- Jernej Kruder
- Mina Markovič
- Mia Krampl
- Domen Škofic

== Cross-country skiing ==
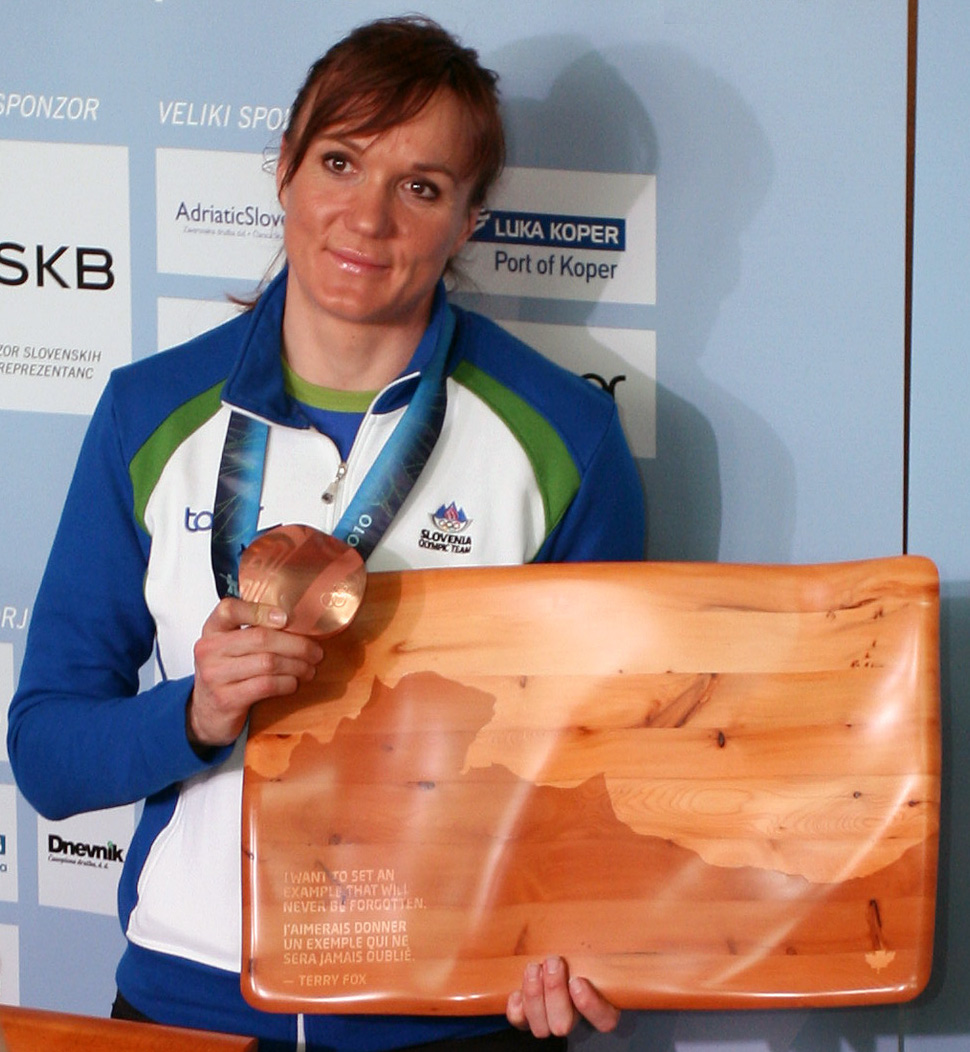
Petra Majdič

- Vesna Fabjan
- Petra Majdič
- Katja Višnar

== Cycling ==
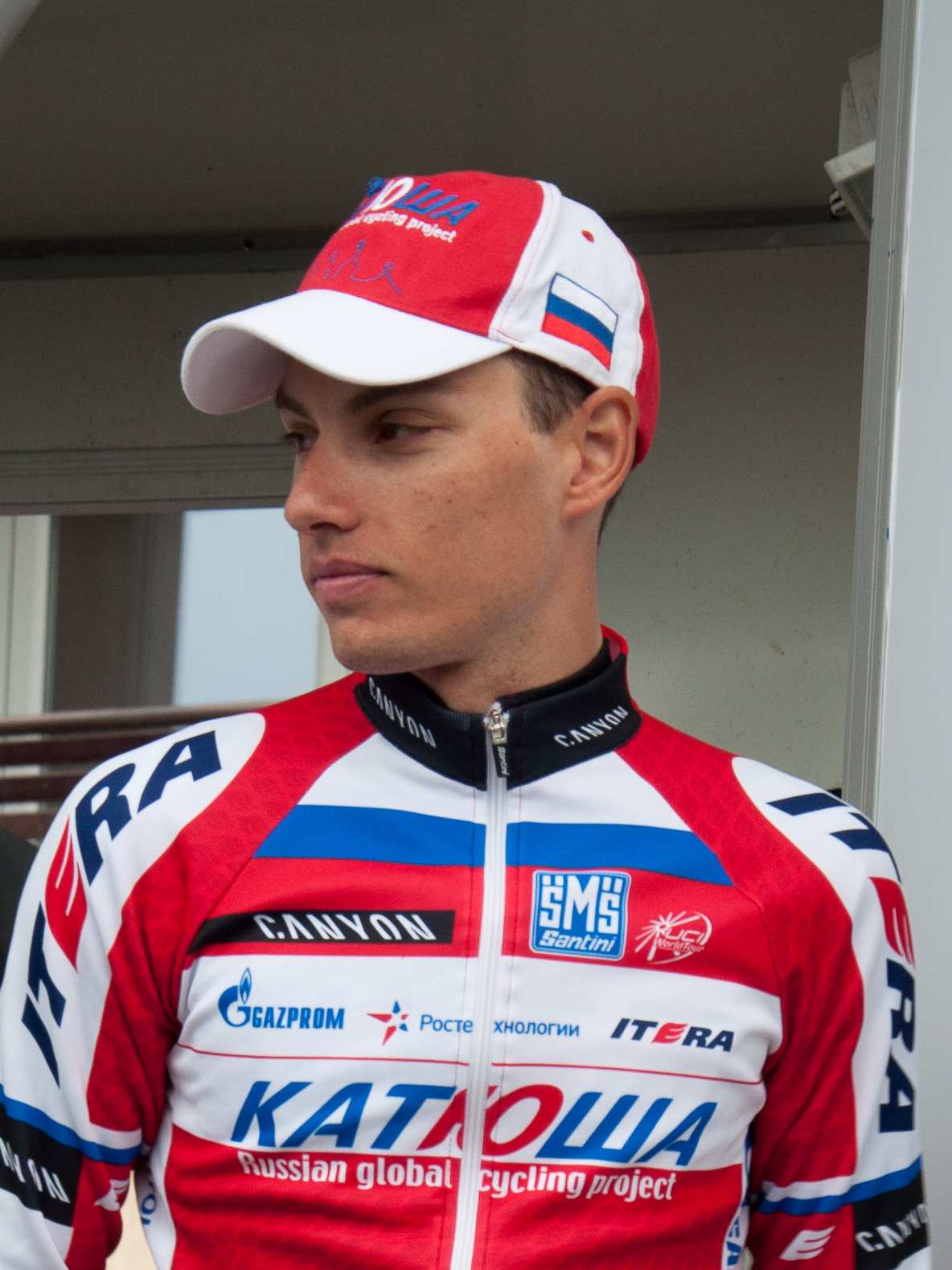
Simon Špilak

- Grega Bole
- Valter Bonča
- Borut Božič
- Janez Brajkovič
- Primož Čerin
- Jure Golčer
- Andrej Hauptman
- Blaža Klemenčič
- Jure Kocjan
- Kristijan Koren
- Marko Kump
- Luka Mezgec
- Matej Mohorič
- Tadej Pogačar
- Jan Polanc
- Jure Robič
- Primož Roglič
- Simon Špilak
- Gorazd Štangelj
- Tadej Valjavec
- Tanja Žakelj

== Fencing ==
- Rudolf Cvetko

== Figure skating ==
- Mojca Kopač
- Teodora Poštič
- Gregor Urbas

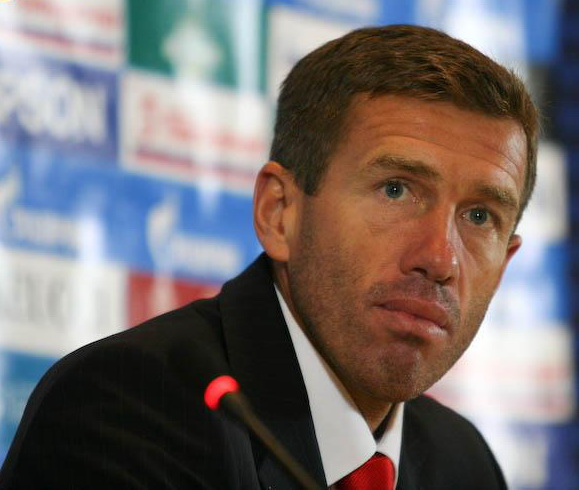
Srečko Katanec

== Football ==
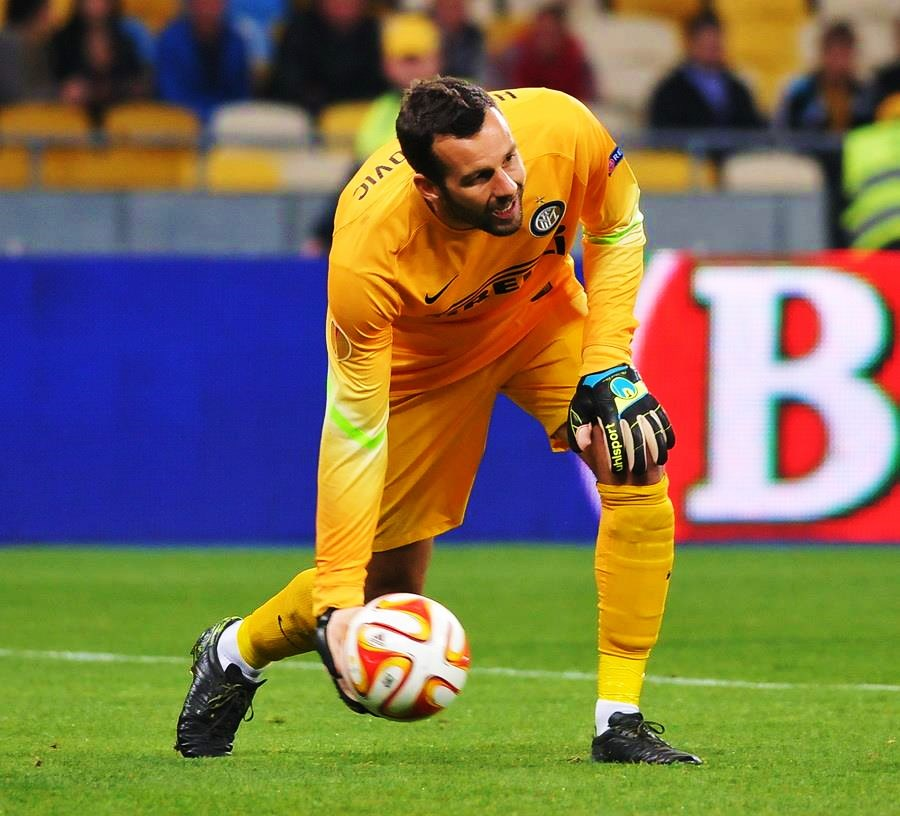
Samir Handanović

- Milenko Ačimovič
- Marko Elsner
- Samir Handanović
- Josip Iličić
- Srečko Katanec
- Robert Koren
- Tim Matavž
- Džoni Novak
- Milivoje Novaković
- Branko Oblak
- Jan Oblak
- Danilo Popivoda
- Benjamin Šeško
- Zlatko Zahovič

== Freestyle skiing ==
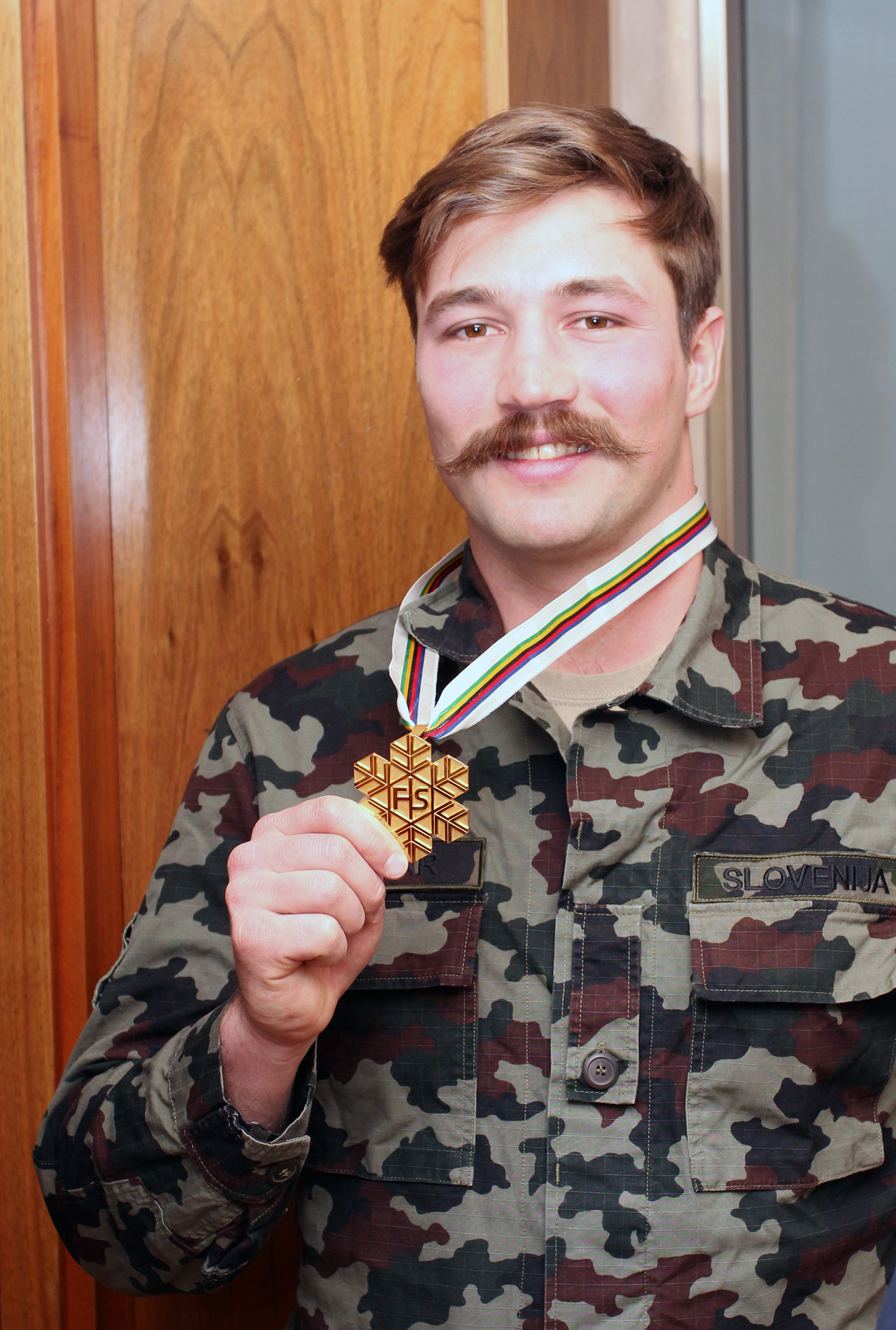
Filip Flisar

- Filip Flisar

== Gymnastics ==
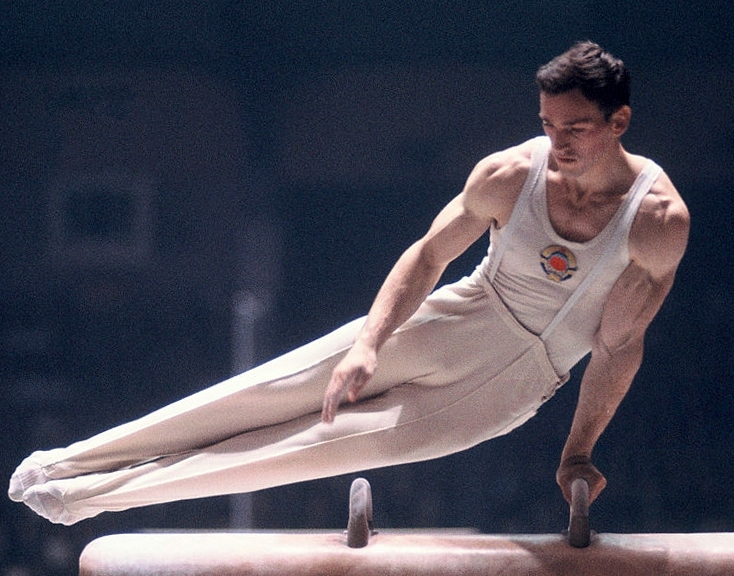
Miroslav Cerar

- Miroslav Cerar
- Stane Derganc
- Aljaž Pegan
- Mitja Petkovšek
- Josip Primožič
- Leon Štukelj
- Peter Šumi

== Handball ==
- Alenka Cuderman
- Dragan Gajić
- Ana Gros
- Iztok Puc
- Rolando Pušnik
- Renato Vugrinec
- Uroš Zorman
- Luka Žvižej

== Ice hockey ==
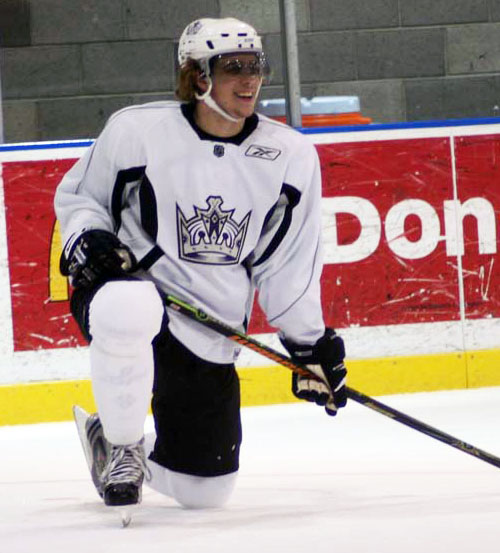
Anže Kopitar

- David Rodman
- Marcel Rodman
- Edo Hafner
- Rudi Hiti
- Žiga Jeglič
- Robert Kristan
- Anže Kopitar
- Jan Muršak
- Žiga Pance
- Tomaž Razingar
- Zvone Šuvak
- Rok Tičar

== Judo ==
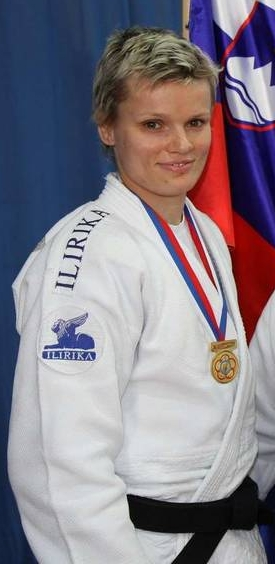
Urška Žolnir

- Vlora Bedeti
- Rok Drakšič
- Petra Nareks
- Lucija Polavder
- Aljaž Sedej
- Raša Sraka
- Tina Trstenjak
- Anamari Velenšek
- Urška Žolnir

== Nordic combined ==
- Gašper Berlot
- Marjan Jelenko
- Mitja Oranič

== Rowing ==
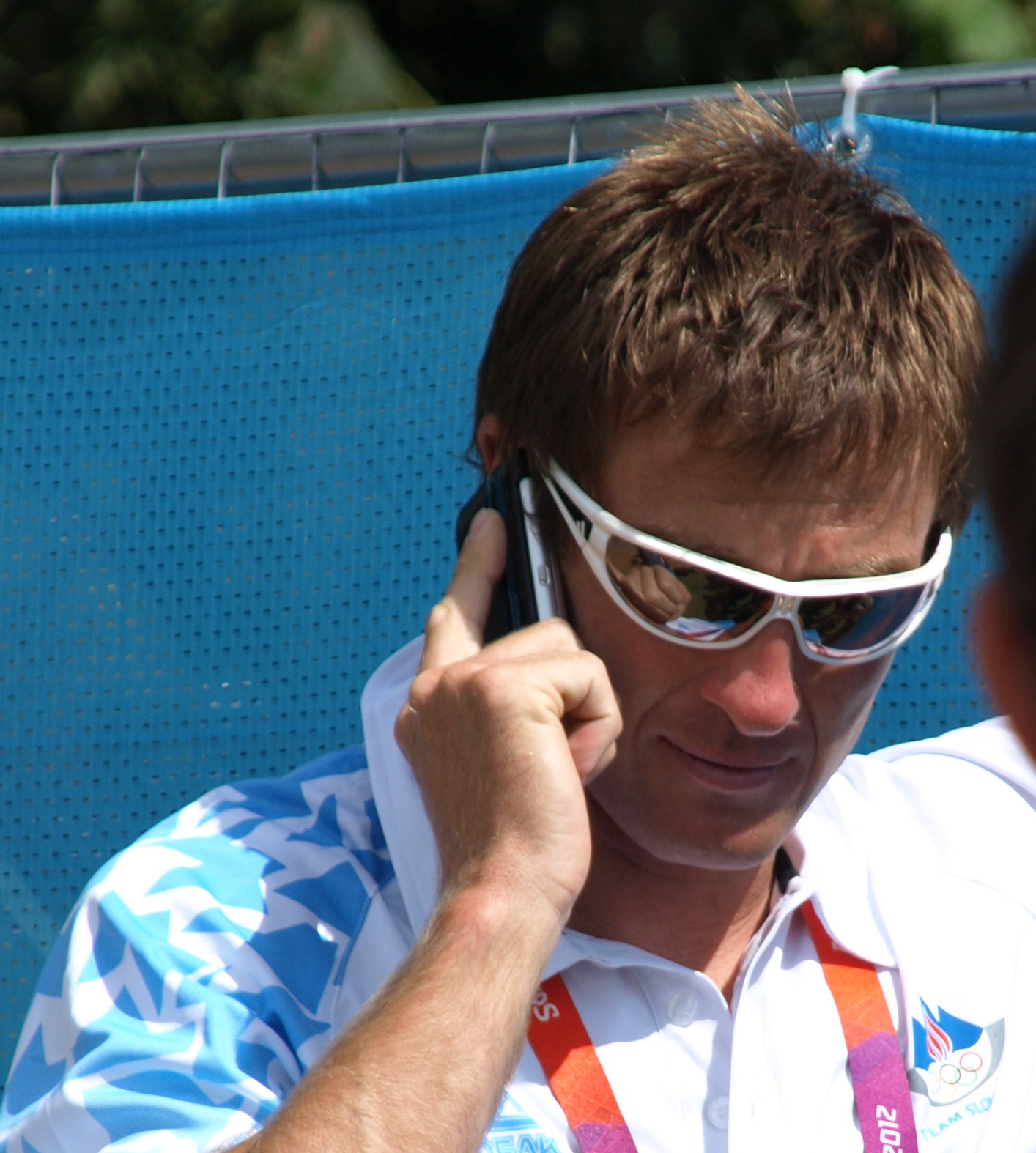
Iztok Čop

- Iztok Čop
- Milan Janša
- Janez Klemenčič
- Sašo Mirjanič
- Sadik Mujkič
- Bojan Prešern
- Luka Špik
- Denis Žvegelj

== Sailing ==
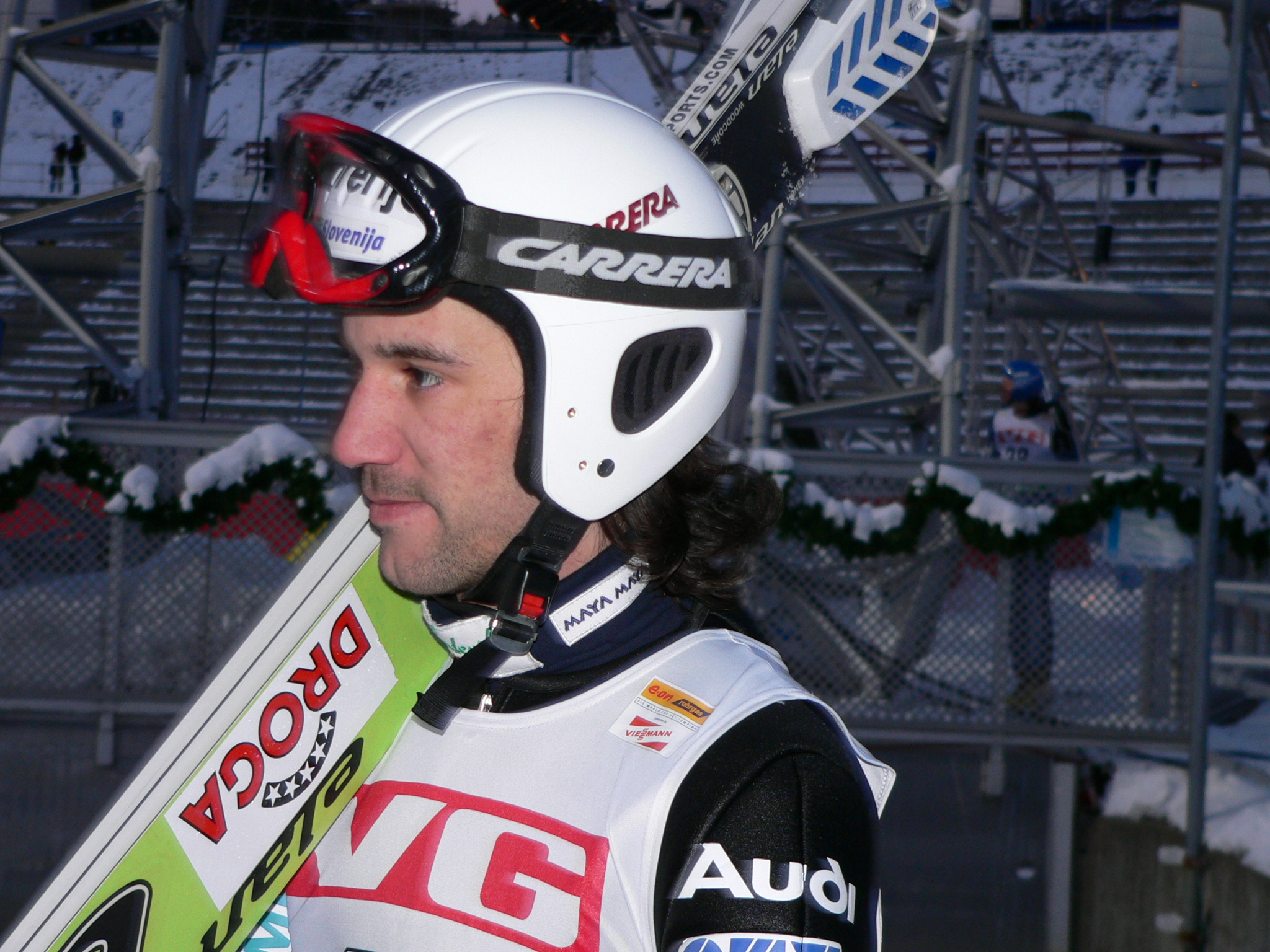
Primož Peterka

- Vesna Dekleva
- Klara Maučec
- Vasilij Žbogar

== Ski jumping ==
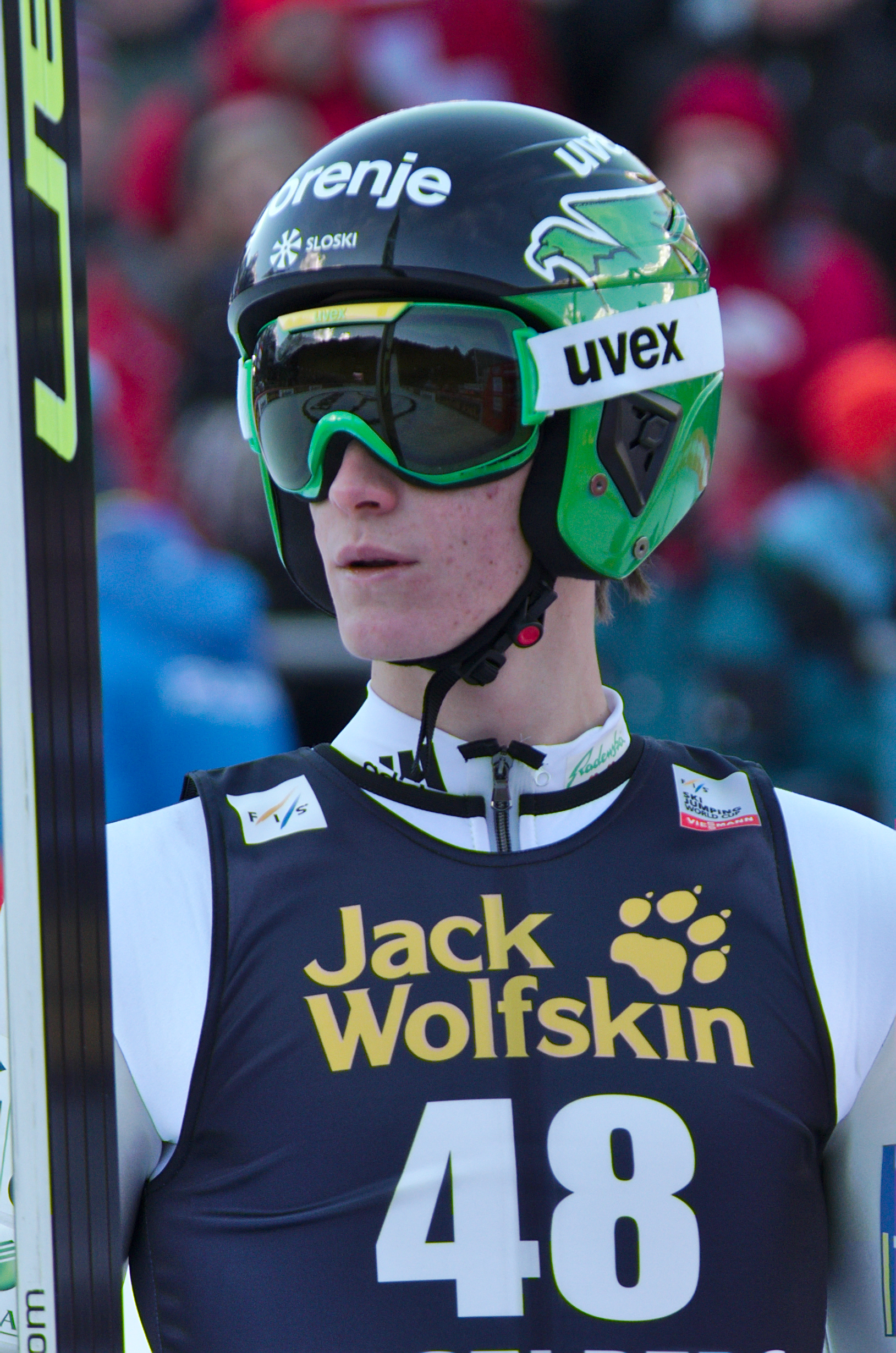
Peter Prevc

- Rok Benkovič
- Jernej Damjan
- Matjaž Debelak
- Damjan Fras
- Robert Kranjec
- Franci Petek
- Primož Peterka
- Peter Prevc
- Jurij Tepeš
- Miran Tepeš
- Primož Ulaga
- Matjaž Zupan
- Peter Žonta

== Snowboarding ==
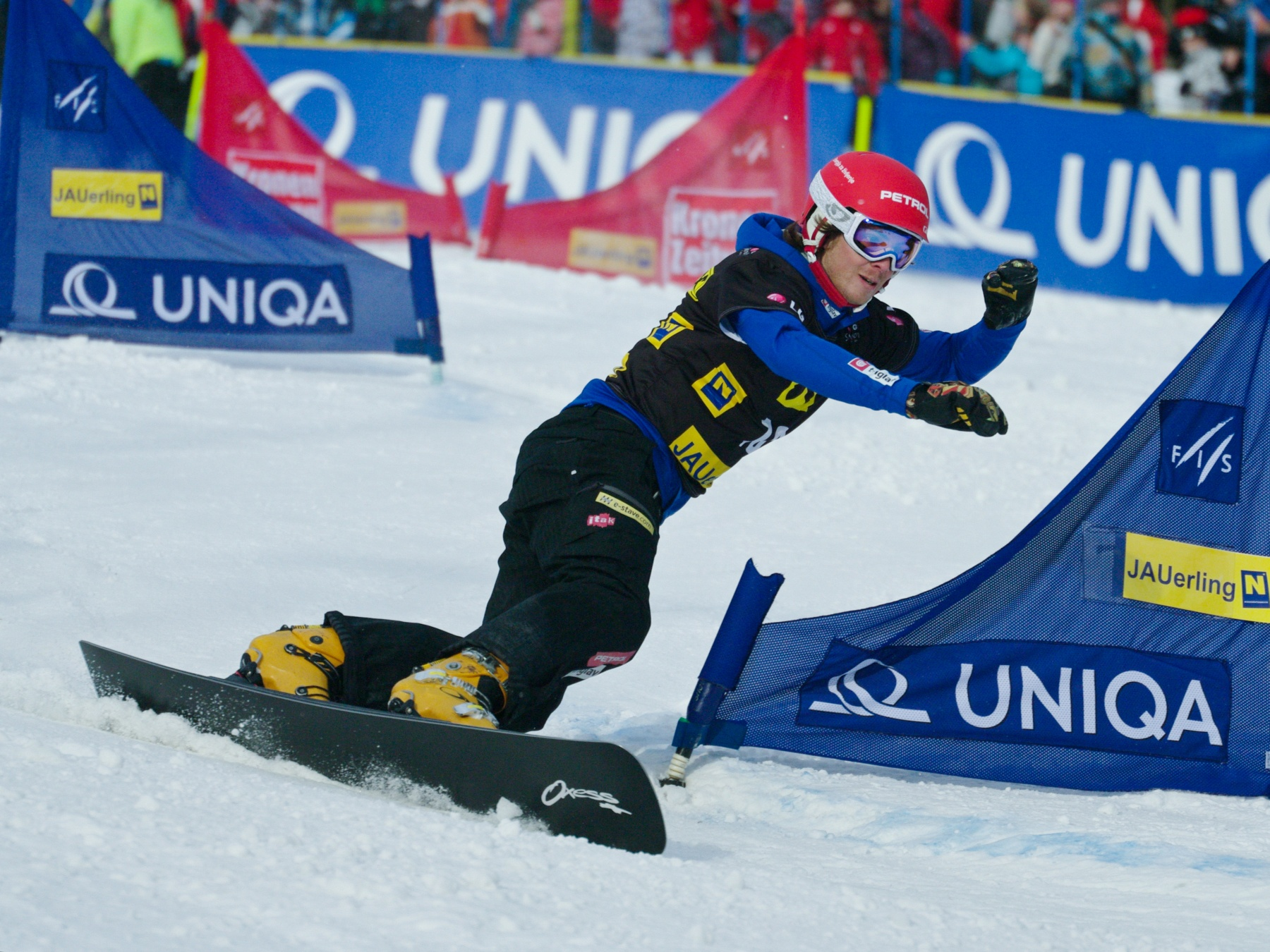
Žan Košir

- Rok Flander
- Dejan Košir
- Žan Košir
- Rok Marguč
- Tim-Kevin Ravnjak
- Cilka Sadar

== Shooting ==
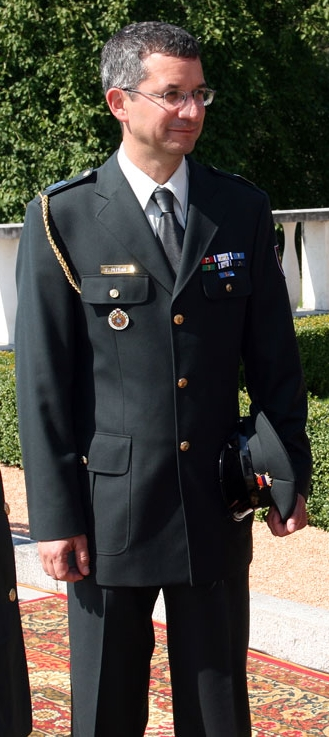
Rajmond Debevec

- Rajmond Debevec

== Swimming ==
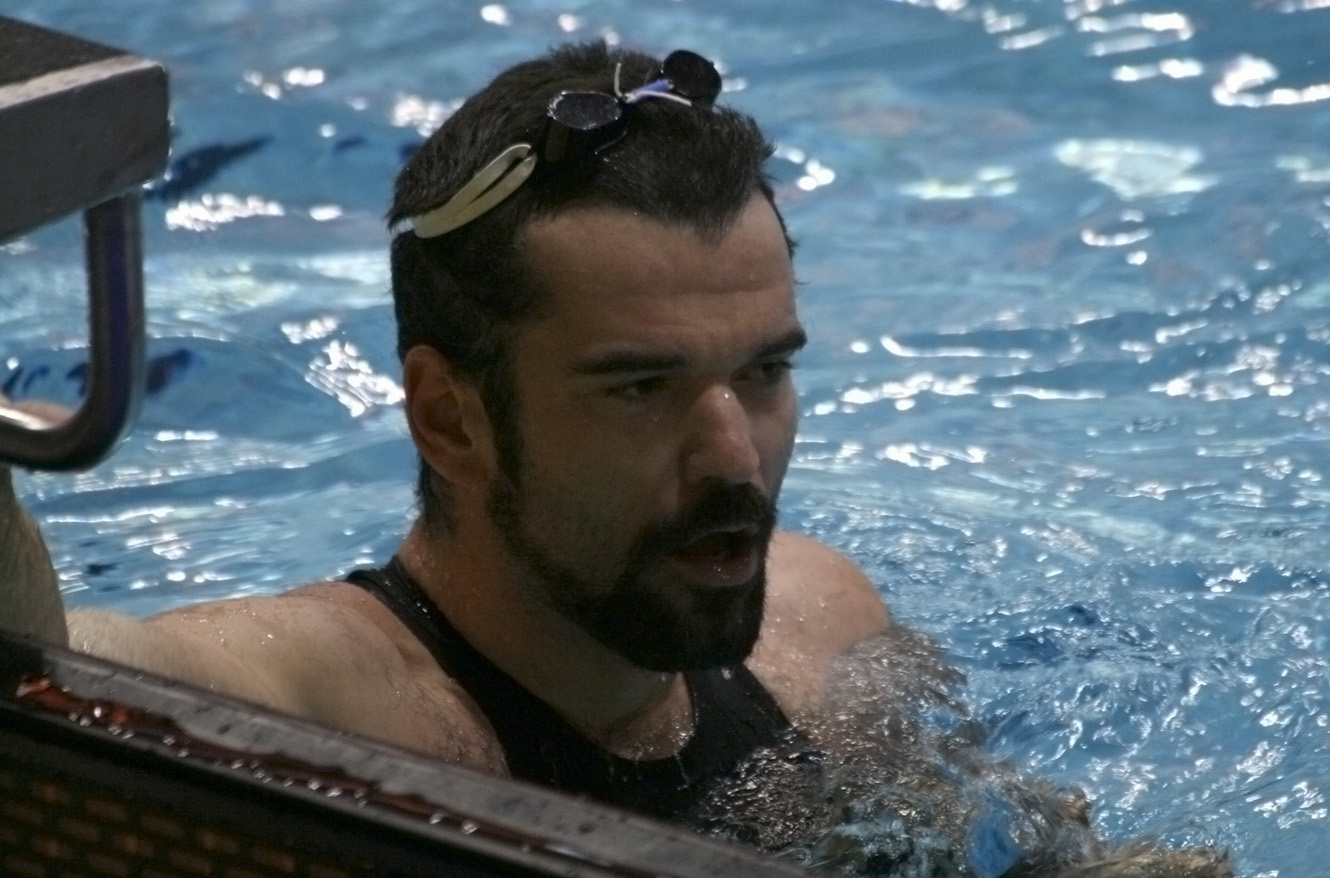
Peter Mankoč

- Anja Čarman
- Anton Cerer
- Damir Dugonjič
- Sara Isaković
- Alenka Kejžar
- Anja Klinar
- Igor Majcen
- Peter Mankoč
- Matjaž Markič
- Darjan Petrič
- Borut Petrič
- Metka Sparavec

== Table tennis ==
- Bojan Tokič

== Taekwondo ==
- Franka Anić
- Ivan Trajkovič

== Tennis ==
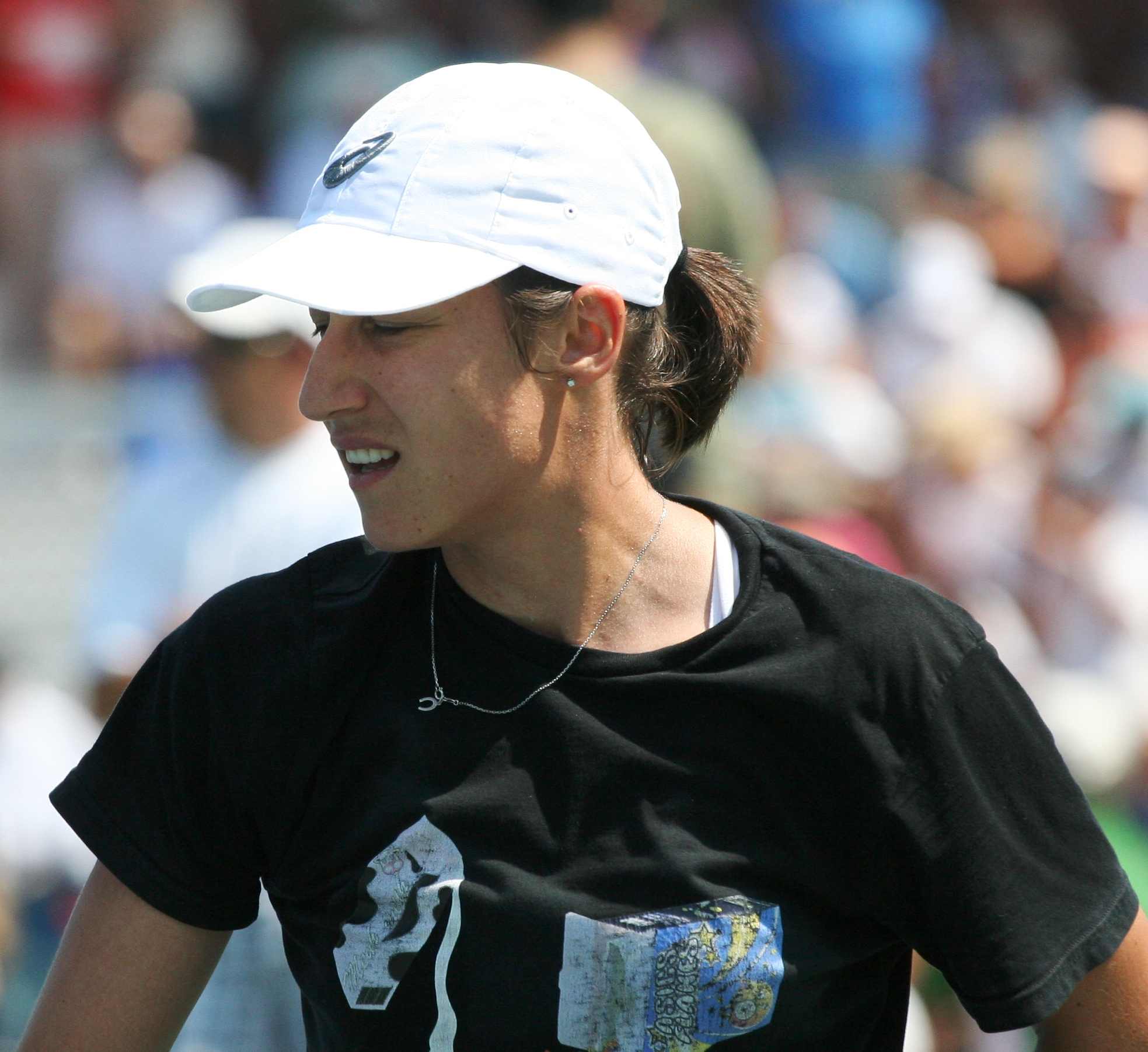
Katarina Srebotnik

- Aljaž Bedene
- Polona Hercog
- Mima Jaušovec
- Blaž Kavčič
- Tina Križan
- Katarina Srebotnik
- Grega Žemlja

== See also ==
- Sport in Slovenia
- Slovenia at the Olympics
- Slovenia at the Paralympics
