= Sport in Slovenia =

Sport in Slovenia consists of a wide range of team and individual sports. The most popular team sports are football, basketball, volleyball, ice hockey, and handball. While the most popular individual sports are skiing, ski jumping, athletics, cycling, and tennis. Slovenia has competed at fifteen Olympic Games since its inaugural appearance at the 1992 Winter Olympics and is also known for its extreme sport athletes, such as ultramarathon swimmer Martin Strel and extreme skier Davo Karničar.

== Team sports ==
=== Association football ===
The highest level of association football in Slovenia is the Slovenian PrvaLiga, which consists of ten teams. The Slovenia national football team have qualified for two FIFA World Cups (2002 and 2010) and two UEFA European Championships (2000 and 2024). Notable Slovenian international players include Samir Handanović, Milivoje Novaković, Josip Iličić, Benjamin Šeško, Boštjan Cesar, Jan Oblak, Bojan Jokić, Jaka Bijol, Valter Birsa, Brane Oblak, Danilo Popivoda, Srečko Katanec, Džoni Novak, and Zlatko Zahovič.

=== Basketball ===
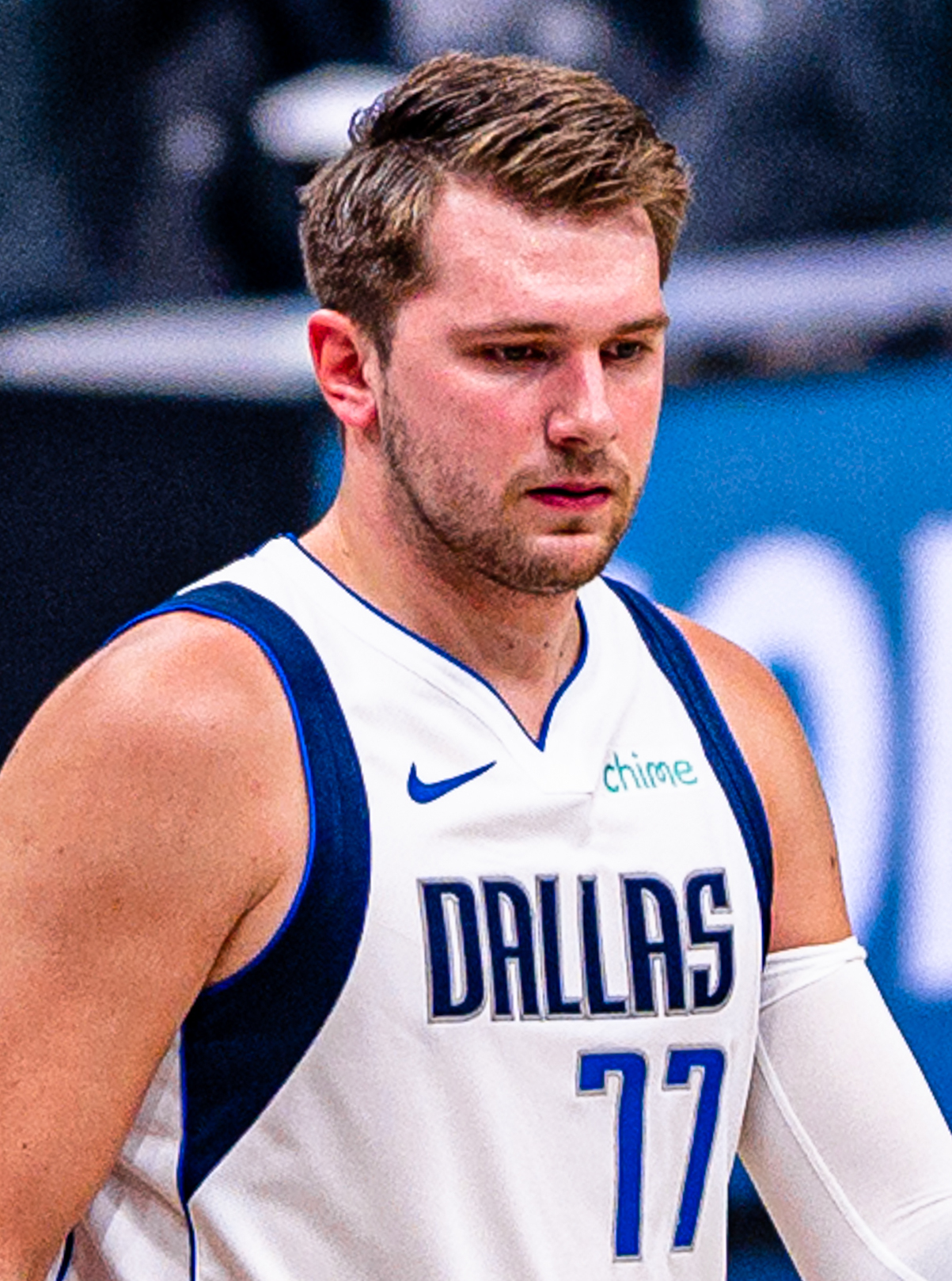
Luka Dončić

The highest level of basketball in Slovenia is the Slovenian Basketball League. The Slovenia national basketball team has appeared in four FIBA World Cups (2006, 2010, 2014 and 2023) and fifteen EuroBasket tournaments, highlighted by a fourth-place finish in 2009 and the gold medal in 2017. Notable Slovenian basketball players include Goran Dragić, Zoran Dragić, Luka Dončić, Sasha Vujačić, Radoslav Nesterović, Vlatko Čančar, Beno Udrih, Matjaž Smodiš, Marko Milič, Ivo Daneu, Peter Vilfan, Vinko Jelovac, Aljoša Žorga, Primož Brezec, Boštjan Nachbar, Sani Bečirović and Jaka Lakovič.

=== Ice hockey ===
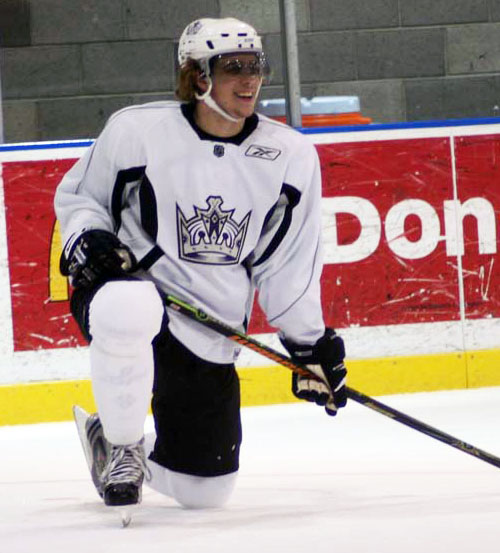
Anže Kopitar

The highest level of ice hockey is the Slovenian Ice Hockey Championship. The Slovenia men's national ice hockey team has participated in 32 Ice Hockey World Championships between 1993 and 2026, including 12 appearances in the highest division. One of Slovenia's most notable athletes is Anže Kopitar, who played for the Los Angeles Kings of the National Hockey League. In 2012, Kopitar became the first Slovenian to win the Stanley Cup and tied as the top scorer of the respective playoffs. Other notable Slovenian hockey players include Robert Kristan, Jan Muršak, David Rodman, Marcel Rodman, Rok Tičar, Žiga Pance, Žiga Jeglič, Tomaž Vnuk, and Dejan Kontrec.

=== Handball ===
Handball is a popular sport in Slovenia. The Slovenia men's national handball team has participated at eleven World Championships, and its best achievement is third place at the 2017 Championship. The national team has also made fifteen appearances at the European Championships and was the runner-up of the 2004 edition, which was held in Slovenia. At the 2024 Summer Olympics, Slovenia finished in fourth place after losing to Spain in the bronze medal game.

RK Celje won the EHF Champions League in 2004, when they beat SG Flensburg-Handewitt in the final. Other notable Slovenian teams are RD Slovan, which reached the final of the 1980–81 European Cup, RK Gorenje and RK Koper.

=== Rugby union ===
Rugby union is a growing sport in Slovenia, which is governed by the Rugby Union of Slovenia (Rugby zveza Slovenije). In January 2025, the Slovenia national rugby union team was ranked 82nd in the World Rugby rankings. There are also many active local clubs, including RAK Olimpija, RFC Bežigrad and RK Ljubljana.

=== Beach volleyball ===
Slovenia featured national teams in beach volleyball that competed in the women's and men's section at the 2018–2020 CEV Beach Volleyball Continental Cup.

== Individual sports ==
=== Ski jumping ===
Ski jumping is another popular winter sport in Slovenia. The first national championship was held in 1921 in Bohinj, when Jože Pogačar won with a nine meter jump. After that, many ski jumpers found success for Yugoslavia, with Jože Šlibar achieving a world record jump in 1961. After the introduction of the FIS Ski Jumping World Cup in 1979, SR Slovenia was a regular host of matches in Planica. The most successful ski jumper of the time was Primož Ulaga, who had nine wins for Yugoslavia. In both 1997 and 1998, Primož Peterka won the World Cup. Other notable ski jumpers are Peter Prevc, Jurij Tepeš, Robert Kranjec, Rok Benkovič, Jernej Damjan, Peter Žonta, Franci Petek and Špela Rogelj.

Since 2011, the Slovenian men's ski jumping coach is Goran Janus, who has helped revive Slovenian ski jumping results. Under his leadership, the team has many individual wins, earned Olympic and World Cup medals, and set a world record. In 2012, the men's team won their first team event in ski jumping and since then has nine team wins. Furthermore, Peter Prevc won the 2015–2016 Four Hills Tourney, the World Ski-Flying Championship in 2016 and the World Cup title for the 2015–2016 season.

=== Alpine skiing ===
Alpine skiing is a popular sport in Slovenia and dates back to the 17th century, while modern competitive skiing began in the 1920s. During the existence of Yugoslavia, its national skiing squad consisted of almost exclusively Slovenes. In addition, the Vitranc Cup races, which are sanctioned by the International Ski Federation and later incorporated into the World Cup, started at Podkoren in 1961 and is now hosted at Kranjska Gora Ski Resort each season. Slovenes Mateja Svet and Jure Franko both won Olympic medals for Yugoslavia, while Jure Košir, Katja Koren, Alenka Dovžan and Tina Maze won medals for independent Slovenia. Ilka Štuhec won back-to-back World Championship golds in 2017 and 2019. Other notable skiers include Boris Strel, Rok Petrovič, Bojan Križaj, Mitja Kunc, Urška Hrovat, Špela Pretnar and Nataša Bokal.

=== Cycling ===
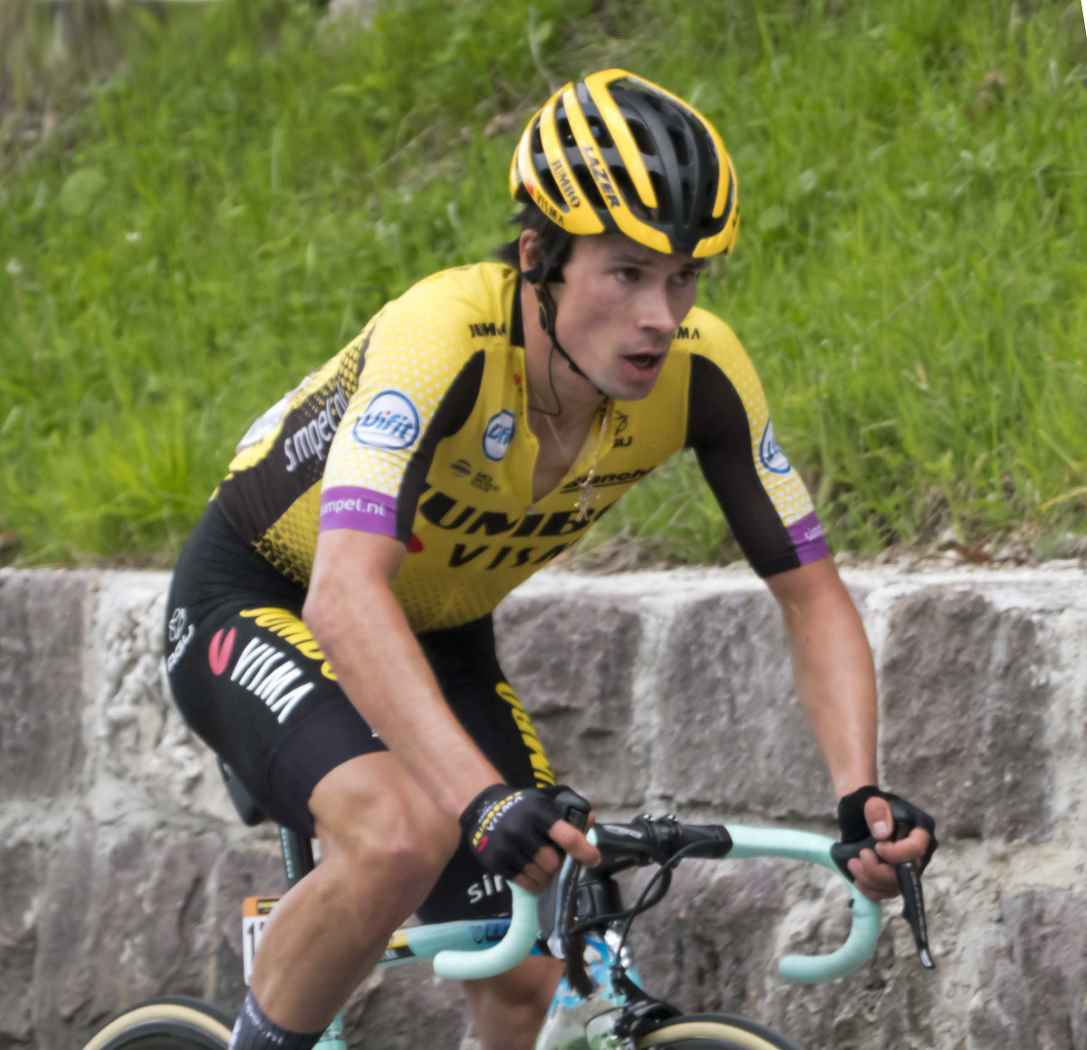
Primož Roglič at the 2019 Giro d'Italia

Cycling has a long tradition in Slovenia. The first cycling club was founded by Germans in Ljubljana in 1885 and the Slovenian Cycling Club was formed two years later. Cycling then spread to other cities, including Gorica and Maribor, and slowly developed into a major competitive sport in Yugoslavia after World War I. Slovenian cyclists were not as successful as cyclists from other parts of the country and in the period between the world wars, Josip Šolar and Bruno Faninger were the only Slovenian cycling champions of Yugoslavia, in 1925 and 1935, respectively. After World War II, Slovenian cycling grew with the formation of clubs such as Rog in Ljubljana, Sava in Kranj and Krka in Novo Mesto.

The Giro d'Italia, one of cycling's three-week-long Grand Tours, has passed through Slovenia eight times in its history: 1922, 1971, 1994, 2001, 2004, 2021, 2022, and 2025.

Notable cyclists include Borut Božič, Janez Brajkovič, Jure Golčer, Andrej Hauptman, Matej Mugerli, Uroš Murn, Jure Robič, Simon Špilak, Gorazd Štangelj, Tadej Valjavec, Tanja Žakelj, Blaža Klemenčič, Luka Mezgec, Jan Tratnik, Matej Mohorič, Primož Roglič and Tadej Pogačar. Roglič became the first Slovenian Grand Tour winner after finishing first in the 2019 Vuelta a España. In 2020, Pogačar became the first Slovenian to win the Tour de France, and he went on to win four more times in 2021, 2024, 2025, and 2026.

=== Athletics ===
Athletics started as a recreation activity in the late 19th century due to the Sokol movement. In 1913, when it was introduced as a sport by the SK Ilirija association football club in Ljubljana. It split into its own branch after World War I and was popular in the Kingdom of Yugoslavia, with the first Slovenian championship held in 1920. However, international success didn't come until Stanko Lorger earned the first Slovenian European Championship medal in 1958 and Draga Stamejčič set the first Slovenian world record in 1964. The most notable Slovenian athletic clubs are ŽAK in Ljubljana and Kladivar in Celje. Notable athletes include Primož Kozmus, Jolanda Čeplak, Matic Osovnikar, Martina Ratej, Brigita Bukovec, Britta Bilač, Borut Bilač, Gregor Cankar, Sonja Roman, Brigita Langerholc, Helena Javornik, Alenka Bikar, Rožle Prezelj and Boštjan Buč.

=== Biathlon ===
Biathlon is a growing sport in Slovenia. However, before Slovenia's independence in 1991, it was a mostly unknown sport and Slovenes achieved no major results until the 1990s. In 1992, Pokljuka began hosting World Cup races and Andreja Koblar won the first race for the Slovenian women's team in 1996, while Janez Marič achieved the same for the men's team in 2003. The most successful biathlete representing Slovenia is the Croatian-born Jakov Fak, who has won several World Championships medals. Other notable biathletes include Teja Gregorin, Andreja Mali, Tomas Globočnik and Klemen Bauer.

=== Cross-country skiing ===
Cross-country skiing has, alongside alpine skiing and ski jumping, a long tradition in Slovenia, but competitive success has only come in recent years. The first cross-country competition in Slovenia was organized in Bohinjska Bistrica in 1914. During the existence of Yugoslavia, the best result achieved by a Slovene was Franc Smolej's 10th place finish at the 1936 Winter Olympics. Petra Majdič is the most successful Slovenian cross-country skier, as she has won 24 World Cup races and one Olympic medal. Other notable cross-country skiers include Vesna Fabjan and Katja Višnar.

=== Motorsport ===
Motorsport in Slovenia began with the formation of the Ilirija Motorsport Club in 1913 and became popular during the two world wars. ŽSK Hermes built the first motorsport track at ŽŠD Ljubljana and Ludvik Starič became a serial Yugoslav champion in the 1930s. The Speedway Grand Prix of Slovenia was held at Matija Gubec Stadium in Krško from 2002 to 2019. There is also a speedway track at Ilirija Sports Park in Ljubljana. Notable motorsport competitors include Matej Ferjan, Matej Žagar, Sašo Kragelj, Tim Gajser, Miran Stanovnik and Mark Kastelic.

The only woman to have circumnavigated the world on a motorbike is Slovenian Benka Pulko. On June 19, 1997, Pulko departed from her hometown of Ptuj on a BMW F650 motorcycle. She returned to Ptuj on December 10, 2002, having established the Guinness World Record for the longest solo motorcycle ride ever undertaken by a woman in both distance (180,015 km) and duration (2,000 days). In the process she also became the first motorcyclist to reach Antarctica, and the first woman to ride solo across Saudi Arabia.

=== Fencing ===
The most notable Slovenian fencer is Rudolf Cvetko, who was a member of the Olympic silver medal-winning team in 1912 for Austria. He was the first Slovenian to win an Olympic medal and a promoter of fencing in Yugoslav Slovenia.

=== Gymnastics ===
Gymnastics played an important part in the beginnings of sport in Slovenia through a national revival of the Falcon and Hawk societies which helped young Slovenes socialize and keep their language alive. Slovenians would win eight Olympic medals for the Kingdom of Yugoslavia, all in the gymnastics field, which were the only medals Yugoslavia earned prior to World War II. Notable Slovene gymnasts include Leon Štukelj, Mitja Petkovšek, Aljaž Pegan, Stane Derganc, Josip Primožič, Miroslav Cerar, Adela Šajn, Rok Klavora and Sašo Bertoncelj.

=== Judo ===
Notable Slovene judo athletes include Urška Žolnir, Lucija Polavder, Raša Sraka, Petra Nareks, Matjaž Ceraj, Anamari Velenšek, Tina Trstenjak, Rok Drakšič and Sašo Jereb.

=== Sailing ===
Slovenia has had multiple successful sailors, including Gašper Vinčec and Olympic medalist Vasilij Žbogar.

=== Standup paddleboarding ===
Slovenia is a destination for standup paddleboarding due to its coastline, lakes and rivers.

=== Shooting ===
The most successful Slovenian sport shooter is Rajmond Debevec, who has competed at eight Olympics and won gold and two bronze medals. He also hold the world record for the 50 metre rifle three positions event.

=== Snowboarding ===
Notable Slovenian snowboarders include Žan Košir, Rok Marguč, Rok Flander, Dejan Košir and Tim-Kevin Ravnjak.

=== Swimming ===
Notable Slovenian swimmers include Sara Isakovič, Peter Mankoč, Borut Petrič, Darjan Petrič, Anja Klinar, Alenka Kejžar, Nataša Kejžar, Emil Tahirovič, Damir Dugonjič and Anja Čarman.

=== Tennis ===
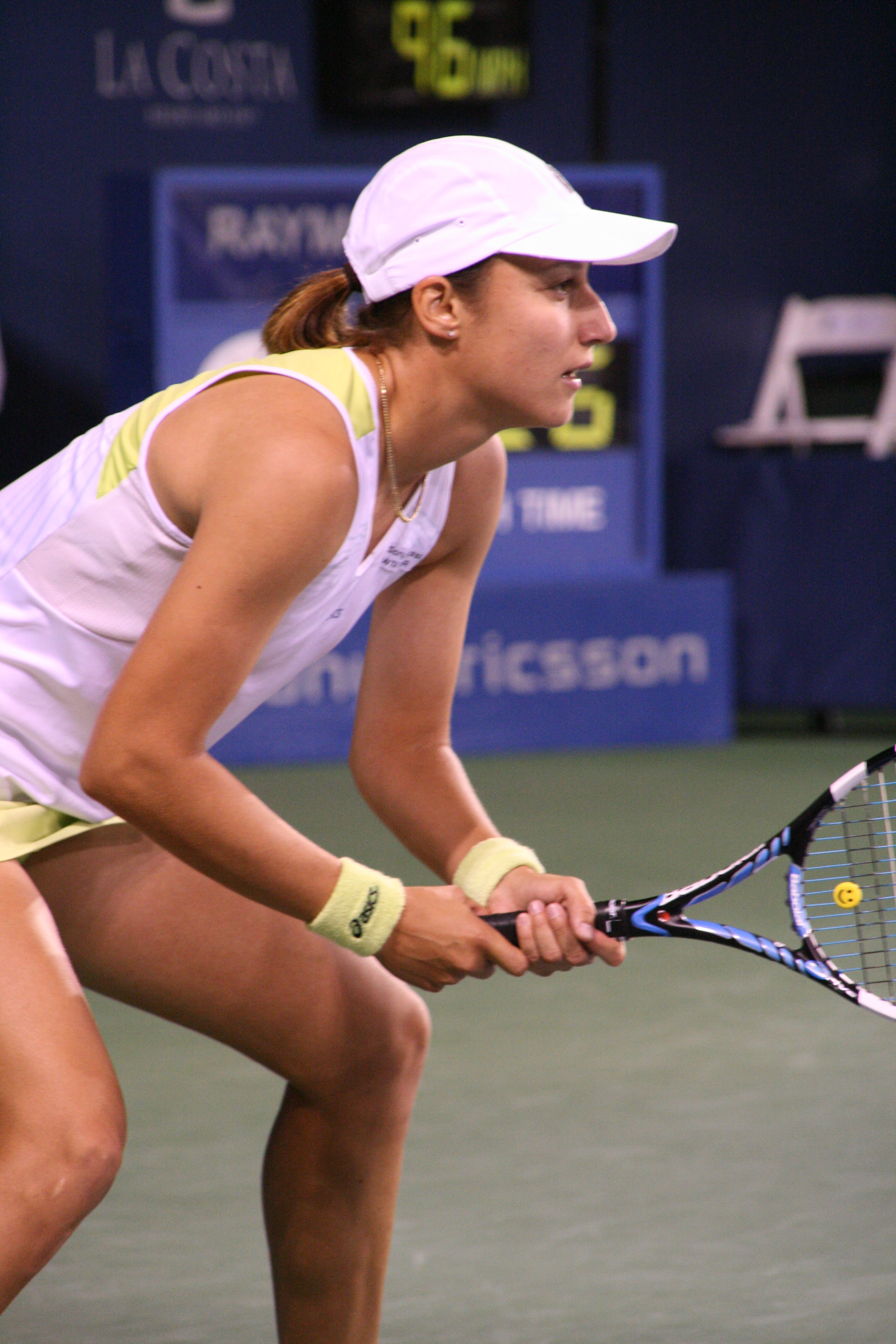
Katarina Srebotnik

Notable Slovenian tennis players include Grega Žemlja, Tamara Zidanšek, Katarina Srebotnik, Blaž Kavčič, Polona Hercog, Maša Zec Peškirič and Nastja Kolar.

=== Canoeing and kayaking ===
Slovenia has won numerous titles in canoeing and kayaking and hosts competitions at Tacen Whitewater Course. The most successful canoeists and kayakers are Peter Kauzer and Benjamin Savšek.

=== Mountain climbing ===
Slovenia has a major presence in alpinism, with notable Slovene alpinists including Tomaž Humar, Tomo Česen, Julius Kugy, Jakob Aljaž, Klement Jug, Davo Karničar, Nejc Zaplotnik, Miha Valič, Aljaž Anderle, Viki Grošelj, Pavle Kozje, and Igor Škamperle.

=== Rowing ===
Since Slovenia's independence in 1991, rowers have found excellent results in international competition. Notable rower in Slovenia include Iztok Čop, Milan Janša, Jani Klemenčič, Rok Kolander, Sašo Mirjanič, Sadik Mujkić, Miha Pirih, Matjaž Pirih, Denis Žvegelj, Matej Prelog and Luka Špik.

=== Climbing ===
Since the mid-2000s, Slovenia has had some of the most successful sports climbers in the world, including Mina Markovič and Janja Garnbret who won the overall lead and overall combined titles in multiple consecutive years each. Garnbret also won gold at the first ever Olympic sport climbing competition at the 2020 Summer Olympics, and successfully defended her title at the 2024 Summer Olympics. Other notable athletes are Jernej Kruder, Domen Škofic, Luka Potočar, Natalija Gros, Martina Čufar, Mia Krampl, Katja Debevec, Lučka Rakovec and Vita Lukan.

== Olympics ==
Slovenia has achieved impressive Olympic success relative to its size, having earned 31 medals (ten gold, ten silver and eleven bronze) at nine Summer Olympics, and 28 medals (six gold, nine silver and thirteen bronze) at ten Winter Olympics. At the 2010 Winter Olympics in Vancouver, Slovenia's three medals, at roughly one medal for every 681,000 Slovenes, was the third best per capita medal ratio behind only Norway and Austria.

Prior to 1991, Slovenian athletes competed for other countries. The first medal won by an ethnic Slovenian was Rudolf Cvetko, who won silver in fencing in 1912 representing Austria. After World War I, when the Habsburg monarchy collapsed and the Kingdom of Yugoslavia was formed, Slovenian athletes won all of their medals for the Kingdom of Yugoslavia. At the 1924 Summer Olympics, Leon Štukelj won two gold medals in gymnastics. At the 1928 Summer Olympics, Štukelj won a gold medal, Josip Primožič won a silver medal and Stane Derganc won a bronze medal. In addition, their team won bronze in the team event. At the 1936 Summer Olympics in Berlin, Štukelj, at the age of 38, won the silver at men's rings. After World War II, Slovenians would continue to win Olympic medals under the Yugoslav flag.

== Mediterranean Games ==
Slovenia has competed in the Mediterranean Games since 1993. It is ranked twelfth in the all-time rankings and as of 2016, Slovenia has won 136 medals (40 gold, 39 silver and 57 bronze).

== See also ==
- List of Slovenian sportspeople
