= Dare Bernot =

Yugoslav slalom canoeist

Medal record

Men's canoe slalom

Representing Yugoslavia

World Championships
Silver medal – second place	1963 Spittal	C-2

Dare Bernot was a Yugoslav slalom canoeist who competed from the mid-1950s to the mid-1960s. He won a silver medal in the C-2 event at the 1963 ICF Canoe Slalom World Championships in Spittal, racing with his brother Natan Bernot.

He died in December 1981 in a plane crash in Corsica, along with his ten-year-old daughter Ana, son Matic, and wife Meta.
