= Natan Bernot =

Slovenian mechanical engineer (1931–2018)

Medal record

Men's canoe slalom

Representing Yugoslavia

World Championships
| Silver medal – second place | 1963 Spittal | C-2 |

Natan Bernot (11 April 1931 – 22 August 2018) was a Slovenian mechanical engineer, energy engineering and energy development specialist and a former Yugoslav slalom canoeist from Slovenia who competed from the mid-1950s to the late 1960s. With his brother Dare, he won a silver medal in the C-2 event at the 1963 ICF Canoe Slalom World Championships in Spittal.

In his professional work Natan Bernot favoured a complex approach to the world's energy issues. A new area of study, the energiology should address the complex links between energy development, technology and social issues, especially labour and education. Energiology is expected to provide new insight and guidance for policies in the relevant areas.
