= Hinje, Sevnica =

Hinje
- Location in Slovenia
- Coordinates: 46°0′27.11″N 15°9′35.93″E
- Country: Slovenia
- Traditional region: Lower Carniola
- Statistical region: Lower Sava
- Municipality: Sevnica

Area
  - Total: 0.54 km^{2} (0.21 sq mi)
- Elevation: 316.6 m (1,039 ft)

Population (2012)
  - Total: ▼47
  - Density: 88/km^{2} (230/sq mi)

Hinje (pronounced [ˈxiːnjɛ]) is a small settlement southwest of Šentjanž in the Municipality of Sevnica in central Slovenia. The municipality is now included in the Lower Sava Statistical Region. The area is part of the traditional region of Lower Carniola. The settlement, which was originally part of Koludrje, was established in January 1998 with a decree of the Municipality of Sevnica from 23 December 1997.

== Name ==
Hinje was attested in written sources in 1252 and 1425 as Vichnach (and as Vichna in 1467). The name is derived from *Bhinje or *Bihinje, likely derived from the plural demonym *Byxyn′ane based on the hydronym *Byxyn′a (which yielded the name of Hinja Creek). The first unaccented syllable was lost through modern vowel reduction. The name therefore means 'people living along Hinja Creek'. See also Hinje in the Municipality of Žužemberk.
