= Marendol =

- Location in Slovenia
- Coordinates: 45°57′32″N 15°13′45″E
- Country: Slovenia
- Traditional region: Lower Carniola
- Statistical region: Lower Sava
- Municipality: Sevnica

Area
  - Total: 0.44 km^{2} (0.17 sq mi)
- Elevation: 482.0 m (1,581.4 ft)

Population (2019)
  - Total: 22
  - Density: 50/km^{2} (130/sq mi)

Marendol (pronounced [ˈmaːɾɛndɔu̯]) is a small settlement in the hills east of Tržišče in the Municipality of Sevnica in central Slovenia. The area is part of the traditional region of Lower Carniola and is included in the Lower Sava Statistical Region.

== History ==
Marendol was part of the village of Zgornje Vodale until 2015, when it was separated and made an independent settlement in its own right.
