= Arto, Sevnica =

Arto
- Location in Slovenia
- Coordinates: 45°59′3.11″N 15°23′35.78″E
- Country: Slovenia
- Traditional region: Lower Carniola
- Statistical region: Lower Sava
- Municipality: Sevnica

Area
  - Total: 4.6 km^{2} (1.8 sq mi)
- Elevation: 214.2 m (703 ft)

Population (2002)
  - Total: 393

Arto (pronounced [ˈaːɾtɔ]) is a settlement on the right bank of the Sava River in the Municipality of Sevnica in central Slovenia. The area is part of the historical region of Lower Carniola. The municipality is now included in the Lower Sava Statistical Region.

== Name ==
Arto was attested in historical sources as Ortt in 1433.

== Cultural heritage ==
A 17th-century mansion known as Impoljca Mansion (Slovene: Dvorec Impoljca, sometimes Grad Impoljca, in older sources also Impolca, German: Neustein) stands on the banks of the Sava 3 kilometers (1.9 mi) west of the settlement core. It now houses a retirement home.
