= Lončarjev Dol =

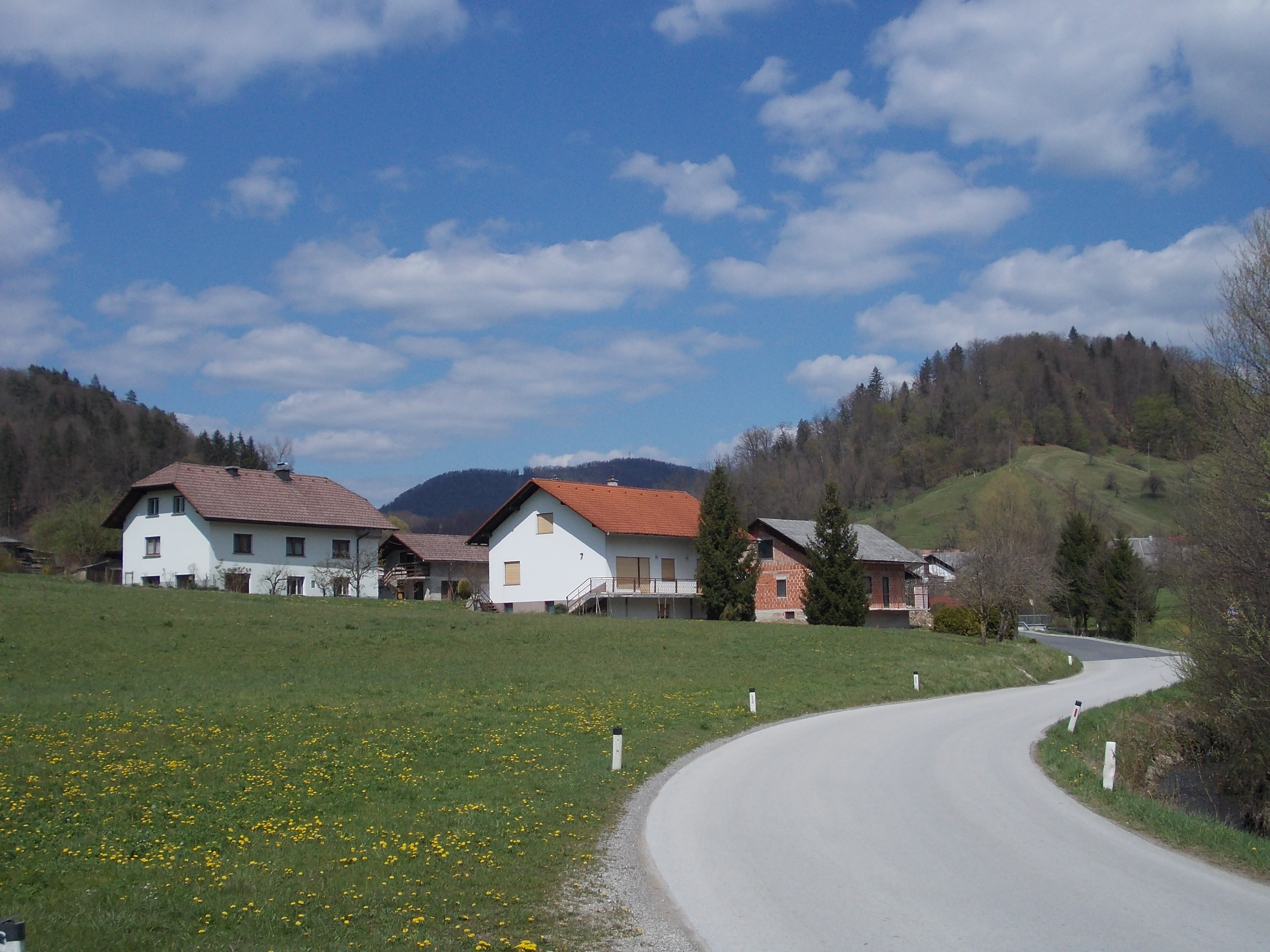

- Location in Slovenia
- Coordinates: 46°0′44.76″N 15°20′35.66″E
- Country: Slovenia
- Traditional region: Styria
- Statistical region: Lower Sava
- Municipality: Sevnica

Area
  - Total: 1.6 km^{2} (0.62 sq mi)
- Elevation: 194 m (636 ft)

Population (2002)
  - Total: 209

Lončarjev Dol (pronounced [lɔnˈtʃaːɾjeu̯ ˈdoːl]) is a settlement in the hills east of Sevnica in east-central Slovenia. The area is part of the historical region of Styria. The entire Municipality of Sevnica is now included in the Lower Sava Statistical Region.
