= Podboršt, Sevnica =

Podboršt
- Location in Slovenia
- Coordinates: 46°0′10.62″N 15°9′10.78″E
- Country: Slovenia
- Traditional region: Lower Carniola
- Statistical region: Lower Sava
- Municipality: Sevnica

Area
  - Total: 2.86 km^{2} (1.10 sq mi)
- Elevation: 332.7 m (1,092 ft)

Population (2002)
  - Total: 94

Podboršt (pronounced [pɔdˈbɔɾʃt]; German: Podborscht) is a settlement southwest of Šentjanž in the Municipality of Sevnica in east-central Slovenia. The area is part of the historical region of Lower Carniola and is now included in the Lower Sava Statistical Region.
