= Račica, Sevnica =

Račica
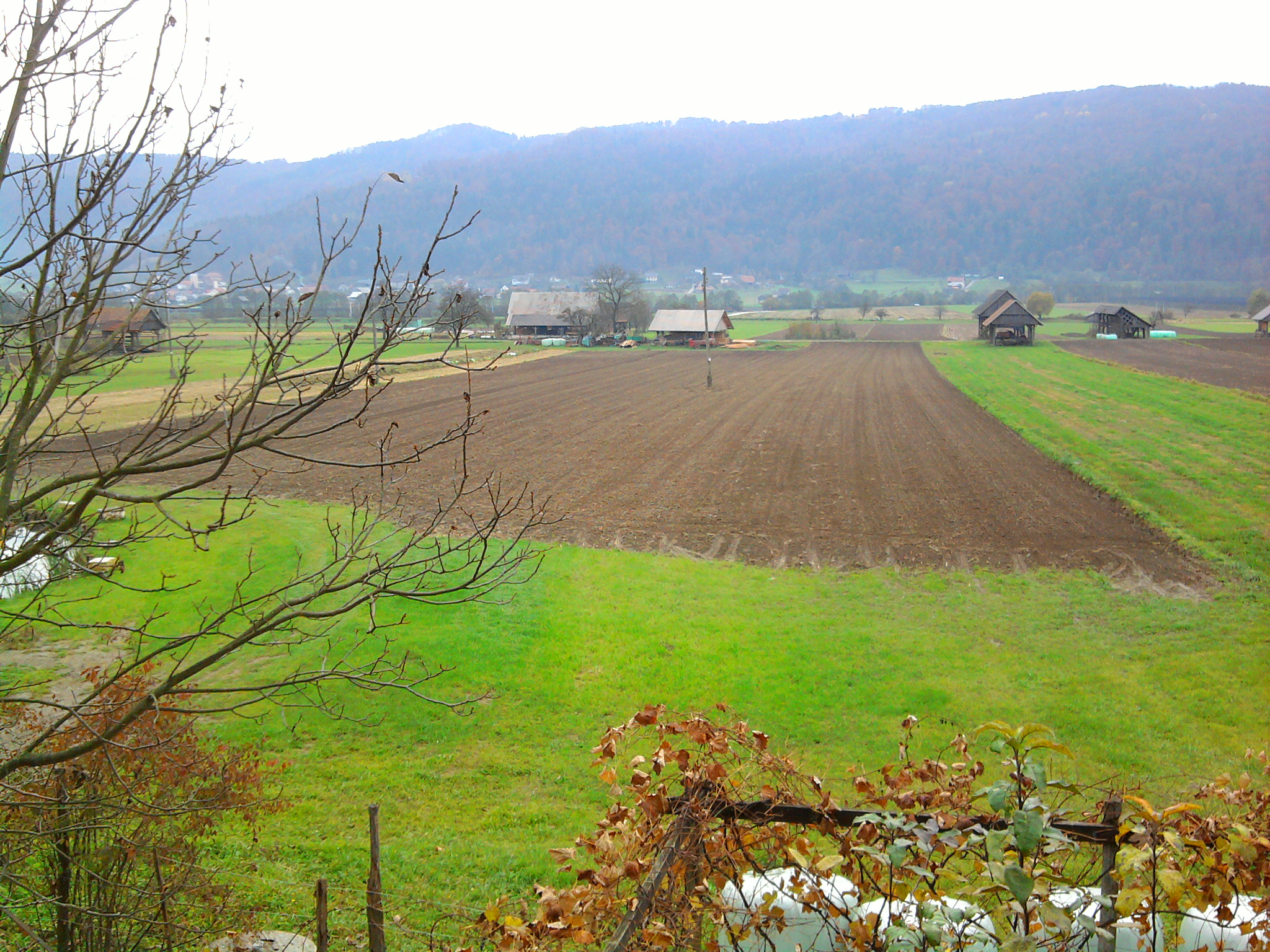
- A view from a house in Račica

- Location in Slovenia
- Coordinates: 46°3′9.71″N 15°12′55.52″E
- Country: Slovenia
- Traditional region: Styria
- Statistical region: Lower Sava
- Municipality: Sevnica

Area
  - Total: 2.07 km^{2} (0.80 sq mi)
- Elevation: 204 m (669 ft)

Population (2002)
  - Total: 207

Račica (pronounced [ˈɾaːtʃitsa]) is a settlement east of Loka pri Zidanem Mostu on the left bank of the Sava River in the Municipality of Sevnica in east-central Slovenia. The area is part of the historical region of Styria. The municipality is now included in the Lower Sava Statistical Region.
