= Kladje pri Krmelju =

- Location in Slovenia
- Coordinates: 46°2′22.94″N 15°6′53.48″E
- Country: Slovenia
- Traditional region: Lower Carniola
- Statistical region: Lower Sava
- Municipality: Sevnica

Area
  - Total: 3.65 km^{2} (1.41 sq mi)
- Elevation: 621.8 m (2,040 ft)

Population (2002)
  - Total: 51

Kladje pri Krmelju (pronounced [ˈklaːdjɛ pɾi kəɾˈmeːlju]) is a settlement in the hills northwest of Krmelj in the historical region of Lower Carniola in central Slovenia. It belongs to the Municipality of Sevnica. The municipality is included in the Lower Sava Statistical Region.

== Name ==
The name of the settlement was changed from Kladje to Kladje pri Krmelju in 1953.
