= Metni Vrh =

- Location in Slovenia
- Coordinates: 46°2′37.51″N 15°18′42.91″E
- Country: Slovenia
- Traditional region: Styria
- Statistical region: Lower Sava
- Municipality: Sevnica

Area
  - Total: 5.22 km^{2} (2.02 sq mi)
- Elevation: 571.5 m (1,875 ft)

Population (2002)
  - Total: 165

Metni Vrh (pronounced [ˈmeːtni ˈʋəɾx]) is a dispersed settlement in the hills north of Sevnica in east-central Slovenia. The area is part of the historical region of Lower Styria. The Municipality of Sevnica is now included in the Lower Sava Statistical Region.

The local church, built on a small hill just south of the hamlet of Žabjak, is dedicated to Saint Lawrence and belongs to the Parish of Sevnica. It dates to the 17th century with some late 18th-century modifications.
