= Podgorica, Sevnica =

Podgorica
- Location in Slovenia
- Coordinates: 46°3′20.76″N 15°17′27.28″E
- Country: Slovenia
- Traditional region: Styria
- Statistical region: Lower Sava
- Municipality: Sevnica

Area
  - Total: 4.52 km^{2} (1.75 sq mi)
- Elevation: 446 m (1,463 ft)

Population (2002)
  - Total: 108

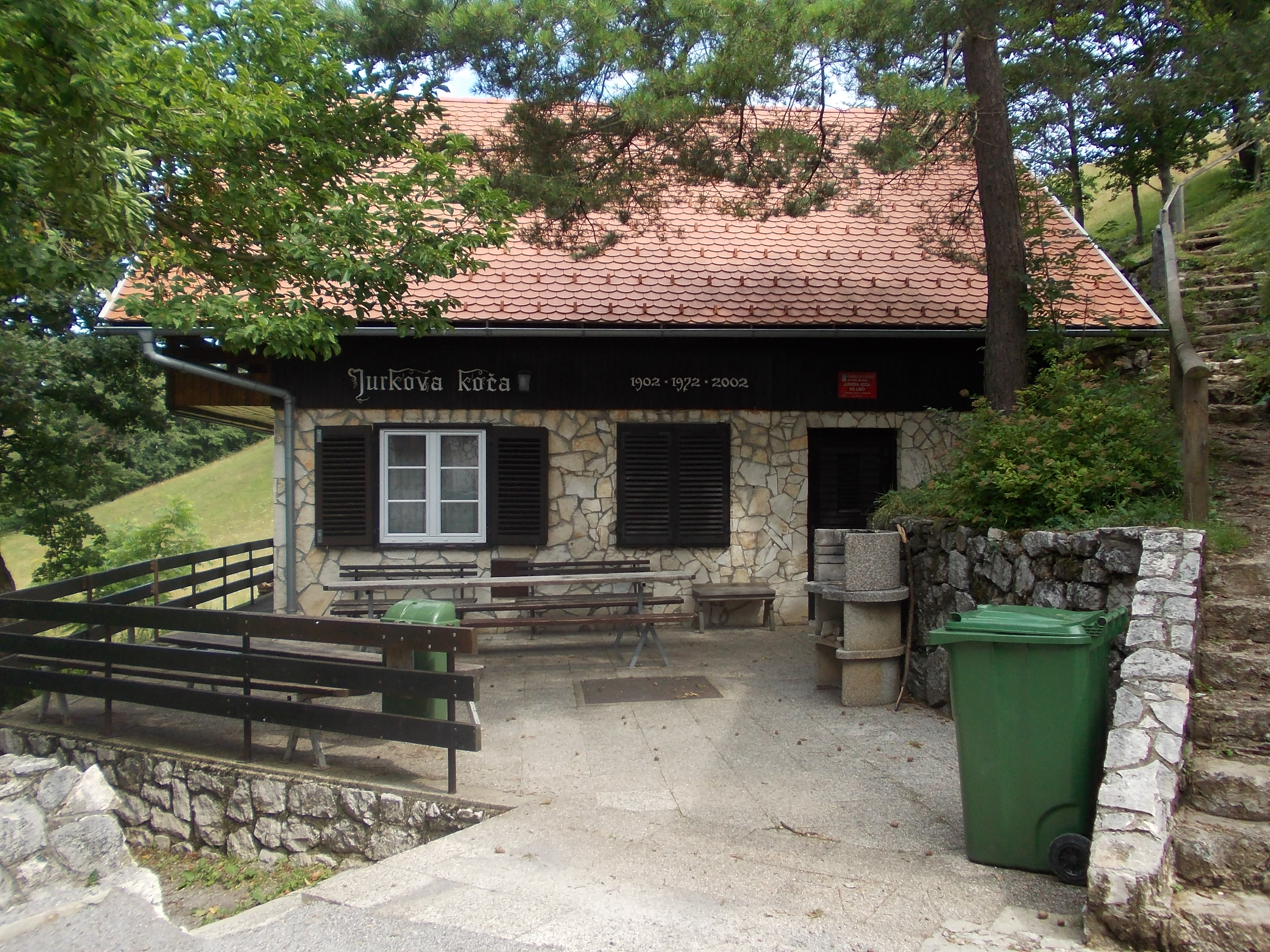
Tonček's Lodge on Lisca

Podgorica (pronounced [ˈpoːdɡɔɾitsa]) is a dispersed settlement in the Municipality of Sevnica in east-central Slovenia. It lies on the slope of Mount Lisca (948 metres (3,110 ft)) north of Sevnica in the historical region of Styria. The municipality is now included in the Lower Sava Statistical Region.
