= Velika Hubajnica =

- Location in Slovenia
- Coordinates: 45°57′48.61″N 15°18′20.33″E
- Country: Slovenia
- Traditional region: Lower Carniola
- Statistical region: Lower Sava
- Municipality: Sevnica

Area
  - Total: 1.37 km^{2} (0.53 sq mi)
- Elevation: 487.7 m (1,600 ft)

Population (2002)
  - Total: 30

Velika Hubajnica (pronounced [ˈʋeːlika xuˈbaːi̯nitsa]; in older sources also Velika Hubanjica, German: Großhubainza) is a settlement west of Studenec in the Municipality of Sevnica in central Slovenia. The area is part of the historical region of Lower Carniola. The municipality is now included in the Lower Sava Statistical Region.
