= Preska, Sevnica =

Preska
- Location in Slovenia
- Coordinates: 45°59′3.58″N 15°17′25.45″E
- Country: Slovenia
- Traditional region: Lower Carniola
- Statistical region: Lower Sava
- Municipality: Sevnica

Area
  - Total: 1.78 km^{2} (0.69 sq mi)
- Elevation: 513.5 m (1,685 ft)

Population (2002)
  - Total: 20

Preska (pronounced [ˈpɾeːska]) is a small settlement in the hills south of Boštanj in the Municipality of Sevnica in east-central Slovenia. The area is part of the historical region of Lower Carniola and is now included in the Lower Sava Statistical Region.
