= Srednik, Sevnica =

Place in Lower Carniola, Slovenia

Srednik
- Location in Slovenia
- Coordinates: 46°1′25.69″N 15°10′7.72″E
- Country: Slovenia
- Traditional region: Lower Carniola
- Statistical region: Lower Sava
- Municipality: Sevnica

Area
  - Total: 2.5 km^{2} (0.97 sq mi)
- Elevation: 470.6 m (1,544 ft)

Population (2002)
  - Total: 65

Srednik (pronounced [ˈsɾeːdnik]) is a dispersed settlement in the hills north of Šentjanž in the Municipality of Sevnica in east-central Slovenia. The area is part of the historical region of Lower Carniola and is now included in the Lower Sava Statistical Region.
