= Ledina, Slovenia =

Ledina
- Location in Slovenia
- Coordinates: 46°2′7.58″N 15°17′17.12″E
- Country: Slovenia
- Traditional region: Styria
- Statistical region: Lower Sava
- Municipality: Sevnica

Area
  - Total: 5.05 km^{2} (1.95 sq mi)
- Elevation: 421.2 m (1,382 ft)

Population (2002)
  - Total: 248

Ledina (pronounced [lɛˈdiːna]) is a dispersed settlement in the hills northwest of Sevnica in east-central Slovenia. The area is part of the historical region of Styria. The entire Municipality of Sevnica is now included in the Lower Sava Statistical Region.

== Mass grave ==
Ledina is the site of a mass grave from the end of the Second World War. The Ledina Mass Grave (Slovene: Grobišče Ledina) is located along the road south of the settlement. It contains the remains of five German soldiers that were shot at the end of the war.
