= Češnjice, Sevnica =

Češnjice
- Location in Slovenia
- Coordinates: 45°57′50.38″N 15°17′19.5″E
- Country: Slovenia
- Traditional region: Lower Carniola
- Statistical region: Lower Sava
- Municipality: Sevnica

Area
  - Total: 0.78 km^{2} (0.30 sq mi)
- Elevation: 420.7 m (1,380 ft)

Population (2002)
  - Total: 16

Češnjice (pronounced [ˈtʃeːʃnjitsɛ]; German: Kerschdorf) is a small settlement in the hills south of Boštanj in the Municipality of Sevnica in central Slovenia. The area is part of the historical region of Lower Carniola and is now included in the Lower Sava Statistical Region.
