= Slap, Sevnica =

Slap
- Location in Slovenia
- Coordinates: 46°3′48.66″N 15°12′8.68″E
- Country: Slovenia
- Traditional region: Styria
- Statistical region: Lower Sava
- Municipality: Sevnica

Area
  - Total: 0.34 km^{2} (0.13 sq mi)
- Elevation: 274.5 m (901 ft)

Population (2002)
  - Total: 20

Slap (pronounced [ˈslaːp]) is a small settlement above the left bank of the Sava River north of Loka pri Zidanem Mostu in the Municipality of Sevnica in east-central Slovenia. The area is part of the historical region of Styria. The municipality is now included in the Lower Sava Statistical Region.
