= Krsinji Vrh =

- Location in Slovenia
- Coordinates: 45°56′24.09″N 15°13′32.01″E
- Country: Slovenia
- Traditional region: Lower Carniola
- Statistical region: Lower Sava
- Municipality: Sevnica

Area
  - Total: 1.31 km^{2} (0.51 sq mi)
- Elevation: 358.7 m (1,177 ft)

Population (2002)
  - Total: 35

Krsinji Vrh (pronounced [kəɾˈsiːnji ˈʋəɾx]; German: Kersin Werch) is a small settlement in the Municipality of Sevnica in central Slovenia. It lies in the hills east of Mokronog in the historical region of Lower Carniola. The Municipality of Sevnica is now included in the Lower Sava Statistical Region.
