= Mala Hubajnica =

- Location in Slovenia
- Coordinates: 45°57′45.43″N 15°17′57.56″E
- Country: Slovenia
- Traditional region: Lower Carniola
- Statistical region: Lower Sava
- Municipality: Sevnica

Area
  - Total: 1.19 km^{2} (0.46 sq mi)
- Elevation: 495.3 m (1,625 ft)

Population (2002)
  - Total: 19

Mala Hubajnica (pronounced [ˈmaːla xuˈbaːi̯nitsa]; in older sources also Mala Hubanjica, German: Kleinhubainza) is a small settlement in the Municipality of Sevnica in east-central Slovenia. It lies in the hills south of Boštanj in an area that is part of the historical region of Lower Carniola. The municipality is now included in the Lower Sava Statistical Region.
