= Pavla Vas =

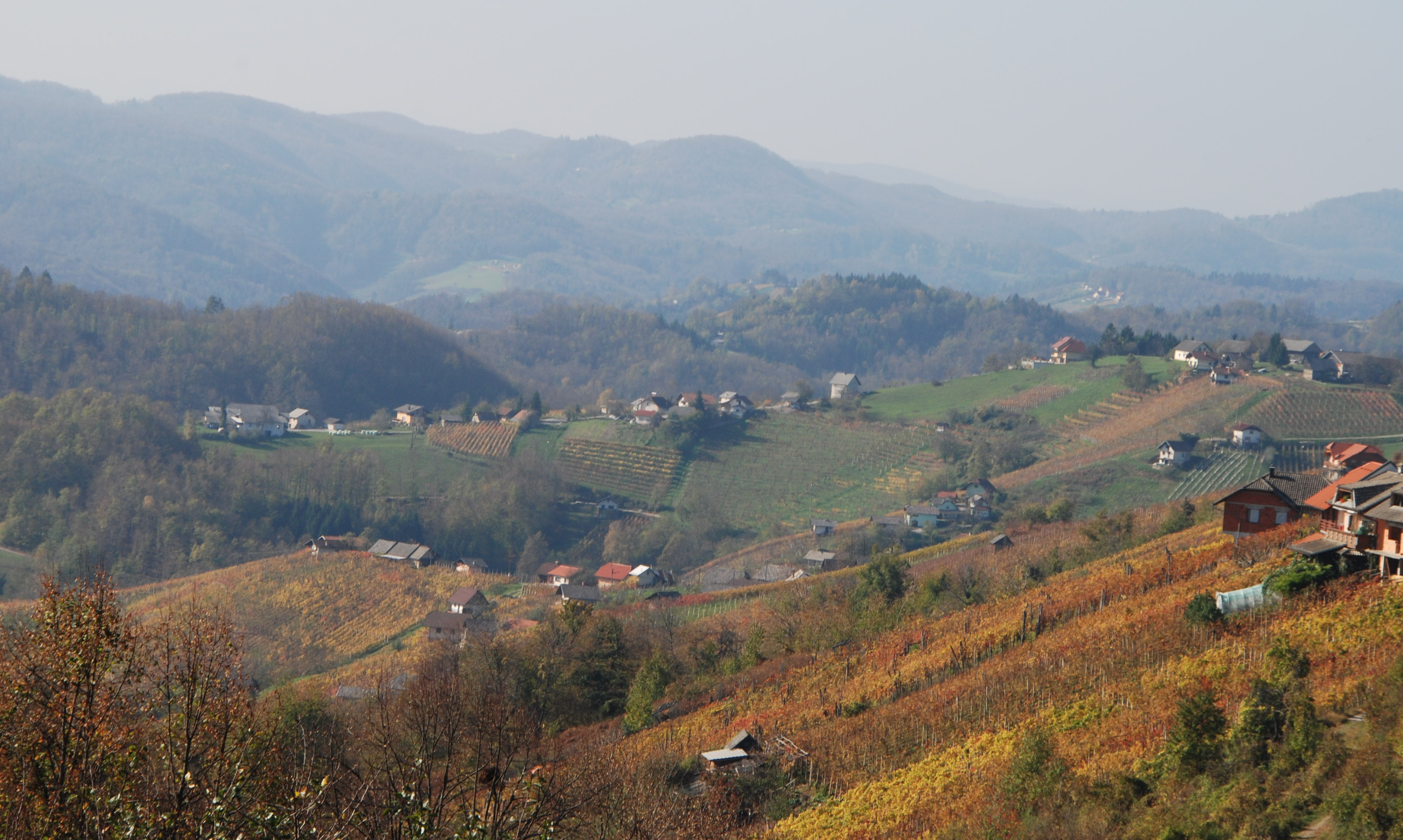
- Pavla Vas, view from Slančji Vrh

- Location in Slovenia
- Coordinates: 45°56′36.17″N 15°12′40.05″E
- Country: Slovenia
- Traditional region: Lower Carniola
- Statistical region: Lower Sava
- Municipality: Sevnica

Area
  - Total: 1.59 km^{2} (0.61 sq mi)
- Elevation: 324.7 m (1,065 ft)

Population (2002)
  - Total: 57

Pavla Vas (pronounced [ˈpaːu̯la ˈʋaːs]; Slovene: Pavla vas) is a settlement south of Tržišče in the Municipality of Sevnica in east-central Slovenia. The area is part of the historical region of Lower Carniola. The municipality is now included in the Lower Sava Statistical Region.

== Church ==
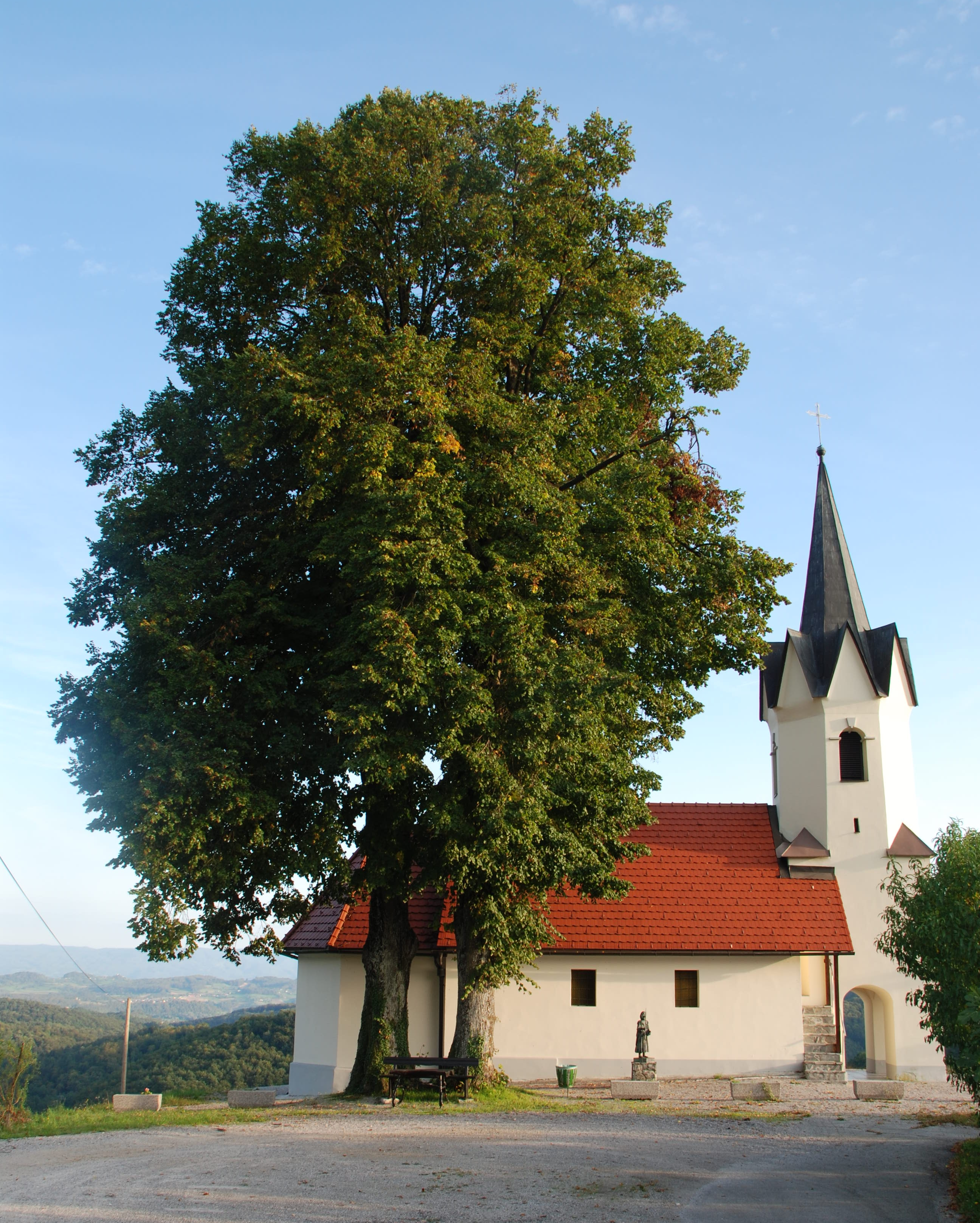
St. James the Greater Church in Pavla Vas

The local church is dedicated to Saint James (Slovene: sveti Jakob) and belongs to the Parish of Tržišče. It is a medieval building with a Romanesque nave that was restyled in the Baroque in the 17th century.
