= Otavnik =

- Location in Slovenia
- Coordinates: 45°56′43.74″N 15°14′25.02″E
- Country: Slovenia
- Traditional region: Lower Carniola
- Statistical region: Lower Sava
- Municipality: Sevnica

Area
  - Total: 1.57 km^{2} (0.61 sq mi)
- Elevation: 434.7 m (1,426 ft)

Population (2002)
  - Total: 25

Otavnik (pronounced [ɔˈtaːu̯nik]) is a settlement southeast of Tržišče in the Municipality of Sevnica in east-central Slovenia. The area is part of the historical region of Lower Carniola. The municipality is included in the Lower Sava Statistical Region.
