= Prešna Loka =

- Location in Slovenia
- Coordinates: 46°1′57.73″N 15°20′4.03″E
- Country: Slovenia
- Traditional region: Styria
- Statistical region: Lower Sava
- Municipality: Sevnica

Area
  - Total: 0.98 km^{2} (0.38 sq mi)
- Elevation: 315.1 m (1,034 ft)

Population (2002)
  - Total: 47

Prešna Loka (pronounced [ˈpɾeːʃna ˈloːka]) is a small settlement in the hills northeast of Sevnica in the historical region of Styria in east-central Slovenia. The Municipality of Sevnica is part of the Lower Sava Statistical Region.
