= Birna Vas =

- Location in Slovenia
- Coordinates: 46°0′19.89″N 15°10′37.27″E
- Country: Slovenia
- Traditional region: Lower Carniola
- Statistical region: Lower Sava
- Municipality: Sevnica

Area
  - Total: 3.02 km^{2} (1.17 sq mi)
- Elevation: 322.1 m (1,057 ft)

Population (2002)
  - Total: 66

Birna Vas (pronounced [ˈbiːɾna ˈʋaːs]; Slovene: Birna vas) is a settlement in the Municipality of Sevnica in central Slovenia. It lies on the road from Krmelj to Šentjanž in the historical region of Lower Carniola. The municipality is included in the Lower Sava Statistical Region.

== Name ==
Birna Vas was attested in written sources as Berendorf in 1455 and Werendarff in 1463, among other spellings.
