= Polje pri Tržišču =

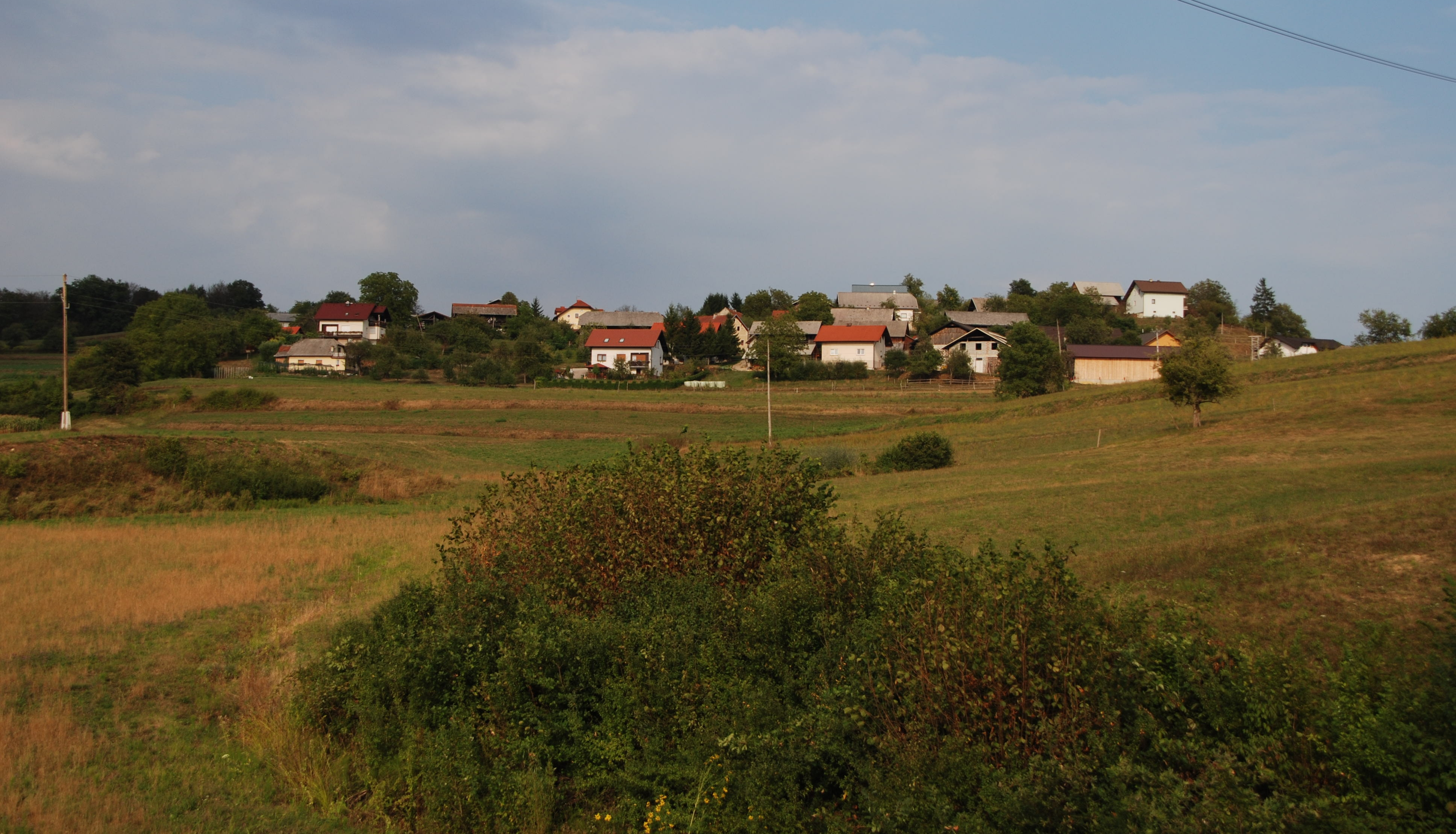

- Location in Slovenia
- Coordinates: 45°58′27.79″N 15°10′49.45″E
- Country: Slovenia
- Traditional region: Lower Carniola
- Statistical region: Lower Sava
- Municipality: Sevnica

Area
  - Total: 1.8 km^{2} (0.69 sq mi)
- Elevation: 281.6 m (924 ft)

Population (2002)
  - Total: 99

Polje pri Tržišču (pronounced [ˈpoːljɛ pɾi təɾˈʒiːʃtʃu]) is a settlement in the Municipality of Sevnica in east-central Slovenia. It lies south of Krmelj in the traditional region of Lower Carniola. The municipality is now included in the Lower Sava Statistical Region.

== Name ==
The name of the settlement was changed from Polje to Polje pri Tržišču in 1953.
