= Zgornje Mladetiče =

- Location in Slovenia
- Coordinates: 45°58′33.43″N 15°9′26.31″E
- Country: Slovenia
- Traditional region: Lower Carniola
- Statistical region: Lower Sava
- Municipality: Sevnica

Area
  - Total: 1.53 km^{2} (0.59 sq mi)
- Elevation: 266 m (873 ft)

Population (2002)
  - Total: 76

Zgornje Mladetiče (pronounced [ˈzɡoːɾnjɛ mladɛˈtiːtʃɛ]) is a small village west of Krmelj in the historical region of Lower Carniola in east-central Slovenia. It belongs to the Municipality of Sevnica and is included in the Lower Sava Statistical Region.
