= Gabrijele =

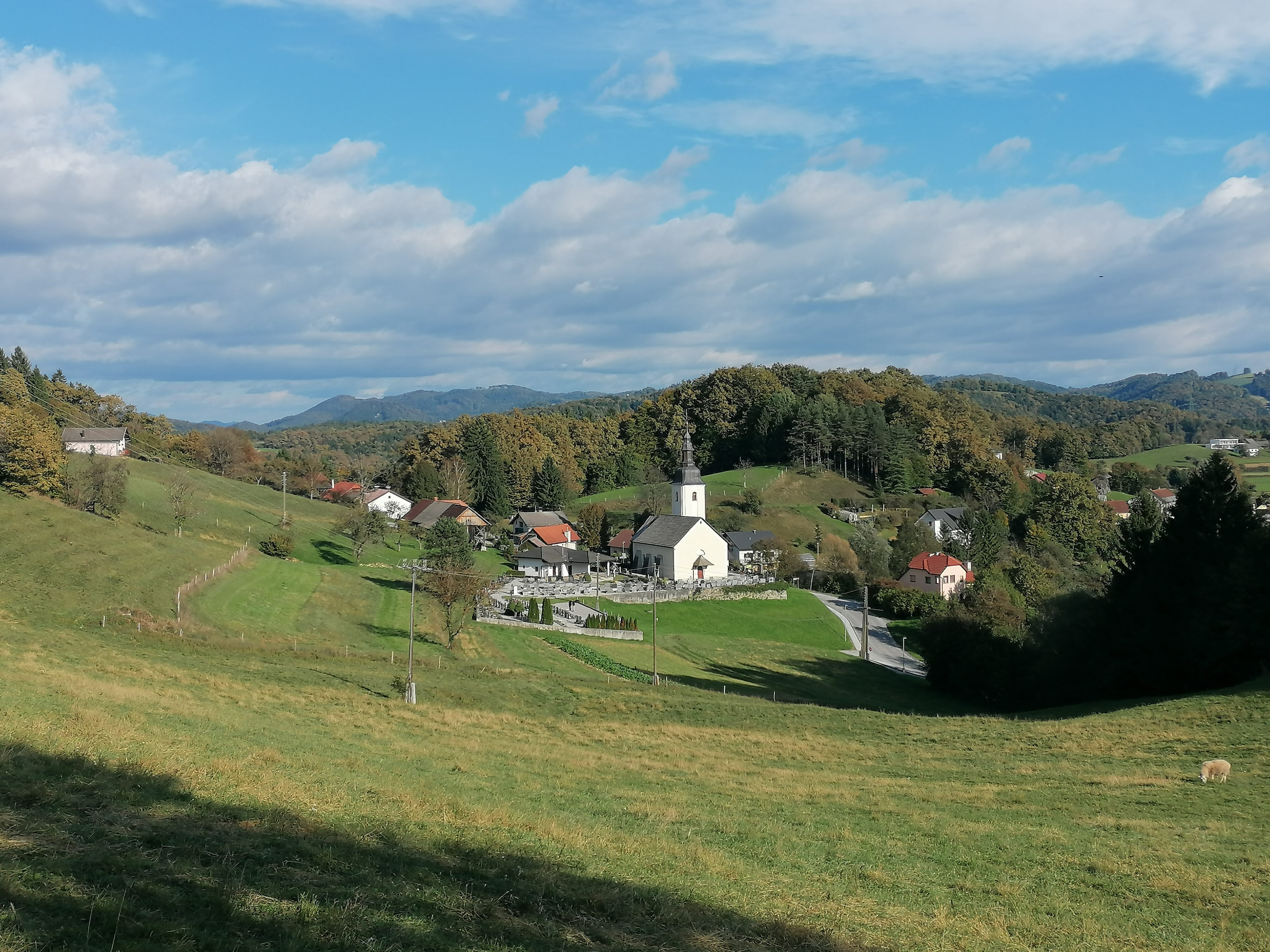

- Location in Slovenia
- Coordinates: 45°58′45.33″N 15°10′20.24″E
- Country: Slovenia
- Traditional region: Styria
- Statistical region: Lower Sava
- Municipality: Sevnica

Area
  - Total: 2.1 km^{2} (0.81 sq mi)
- Elevation: 285.3 m (936 ft)

Population (2002)
  - Total: 234

Gabrijele (pronounced [ɡabɾiˈjeːlɛ]) is a village west of Krmelj in the Municipality of Sevnica in central Slovenia. The area is part of the historical region of Styria. The municipality is now included in the Lower Sava Statistical Region.

The local church is dedicated to Saint Leonard and belongs to the Parish of Tržišče. It dates to the early 16th century.
