= Cerovec, Sevnica =

Cerovec
- Location in Slovenia
- Coordinates: 46°1′25.5″N 15°12′3.04″E
- Country: Slovenia
- Traditional region: Styria
- Statistical region: Lower Sava
- Municipality: Sevnica

Area
  - Total: 3.3 km^{2} (1.3 sq mi)
- Elevation: 441.2 m (1,448 ft)

Population (2002)
  - Total: 58

Cerovec (pronounced [tsɛˈɾɔːʋəts] or [tsɛˈɾoːʋəts]; German: Zerouz) is a dispersed settlement in the hills northeast of Šentjanž in the Municipality of Sevnica in central Slovenia. The area is part of the historical region of Styria. The municipality is now included in the Lower Sava Statistical Region. The settlement includes the hamlets of Podglina, Trebelno, Bajnof (German: Weinhof), Grič, Lesičjek, Veliki Vrh, Hom, and Pekel.
