= Hudo Brezje =

- Location in Slovenia
- Coordinates: 45°57′48.65″N 15°21′46.56″E
- Country: Slovenia
- Traditional region: Lower Carniola
- Statistical region: Lower Sava
- Municipality: Sevnica

Area
  - Total: 2.73 km^{2} (1.05 sq mi)
- Elevation: 95 m (312 ft)

Population (2002)
  - Total: 95

Hudo Brezje (pronounced [ˈxuːdɔ ˈbɾeːzjɛ]) is a settlement in the hills above the right bank of the Sava River in the western Krško Hills (Slovene: Krško gričevje) in east-central Slovenia. It belongs to the Municipality of Sevnica. The area is part of the historical region of Lower Carniola and is now included in the Lower Sava Statistical Region.
