= Telčice =

- Location in Slovenia
- Coordinates: 45°56′34.03″N 15°16′41.95″E
- Country: Slovenia
- Traditional region: Lower Carniola
- Statistical region: Lower Sava
- Municipality: Sevnica

Area
  - Total: 1.59 km^{2} (0.61 sq mi)
- Elevation: 255.4 m (838 ft)

Population (2002)
  - Total: 56

Telčice (pronounced [ˈteːu̯tʃitsɛ]) is a small settlement in the Municipality of Sevnica in central Slovenia. It lies north of Škocjan in the historical region of Lower Carniola. The municipality is now included in the Lower Sava Statistical Region.
