= Selce nad Blanco =

- Location in Slovenia
- Coordinates: 46°0′52.09″N 15°24′26.77″E
- Country: Slovenia
- Traditional region: Styria
- Statistical region: Lower Sava
- Municipality: Sevnica

Area
  - Total: 0.9 km^{2} (0.35 sq mi)
- Elevation: 259 m (850 ft)

Population (2002)
  - Total: 62

Selce nad Blanco (pronounced [ˈseːltsɛ nad ˈblaːntsɔ]) is a small settlement in the hills north of Blanca in the Municipality of Sevnica in east-central Slovenia. The area is part of the traditional region of Styria and is now included in the Lower Sava Statistical Region.

== Name ==
The name of the settlement was changed from Selce to Selce nad Blanco in 1953.
