= Škovec, Sevnica =

Škovec
- Location in Slovenia
- Coordinates: 45°57′1.59″N 15°11′12.39″E
- Country: Slovenia
- Traditional region: Lower Carniola
- Statistical region: Lower Sava
- Municipality: Sevnica

Area
  - Total: 1.7 km^{2} (0.66 sq mi)
- Elevation: 349.9 m (1,148 ft)

Population (2002)
  - Total: 57

Škovec (pronounced [ˈʃkɔːʋəts] or [ˈʃkoːʋəts]) is a small settlement south of Tržišče in the Municipality of Sevnica in east-central Slovenia. The area is part of the traditional region of Lower Carniola and is now included in the Lower Sava Statistical Region.
