= Čanje =

- Location in Slovenia
- Coordinates: 46°0′41.21″N 15°22′14.2″E
- Country: Slovenia
- Traditional region: Styria
- Statistical region: Lower Sava
- Municipality: Sevnica

Area
  - Total: 3.25 km^{2} (1.25 sq mi)
- Elevation: 246.1 m (807 ft)

Population (2002)
  - Total: 124

Čanje (pronounced [ˈtʃaːnjɛ]) is a settlement in the hills above Blanca in the Municipality of Sevnica in central Slovenia. The area is part of the historical region of Styria. The municipality is now included in the Lower Sava Statistical Region.

== Churches ==
There are two churches in the settlement. One on a hill just southwest of the hamlet of Gradec is dedicated to Saint Agnes (Slovene: sveta Neža) and dates to the 13th century with a 19th-century belfry. The second stands on Gradec Hill (Slovene: Gračka gora) east of the hamlet of Brinje. It dates to the 14th century and is dedicated to the Virgin Mary. Both belong to the parish of Sevnica.

== Notable people ==
Notable people that were born or lived in Čanje include:

- Mavricij Teraš (sl) (1889–1960), theologian
