= Stržišče, Sevnica =

Stržišče
- Location in Slovenia
- Coordinates: 46°1′53.39″N 15°22′30.03″E
- Country: Slovenia
- Traditional region: Styria
- Statistical region: Lower Sava
- Municipality: Sevnica

Area
  - Total: 2.21 km^{2} (0.85 sq mi)
- Elevation: 291.7 m (957 ft)

Population (2002)
  - Total: 58

Stržišče (pronounced [ˈstəɾˈʒiːʃtʃɛ]) is a settlement in the hills northeast of Sevnica in east-central Slovenia. The area is part of the historical region of Styria. The Municipality of Sevnica is now included in the Lower Sava Statistical Region.
