= Drožanje =

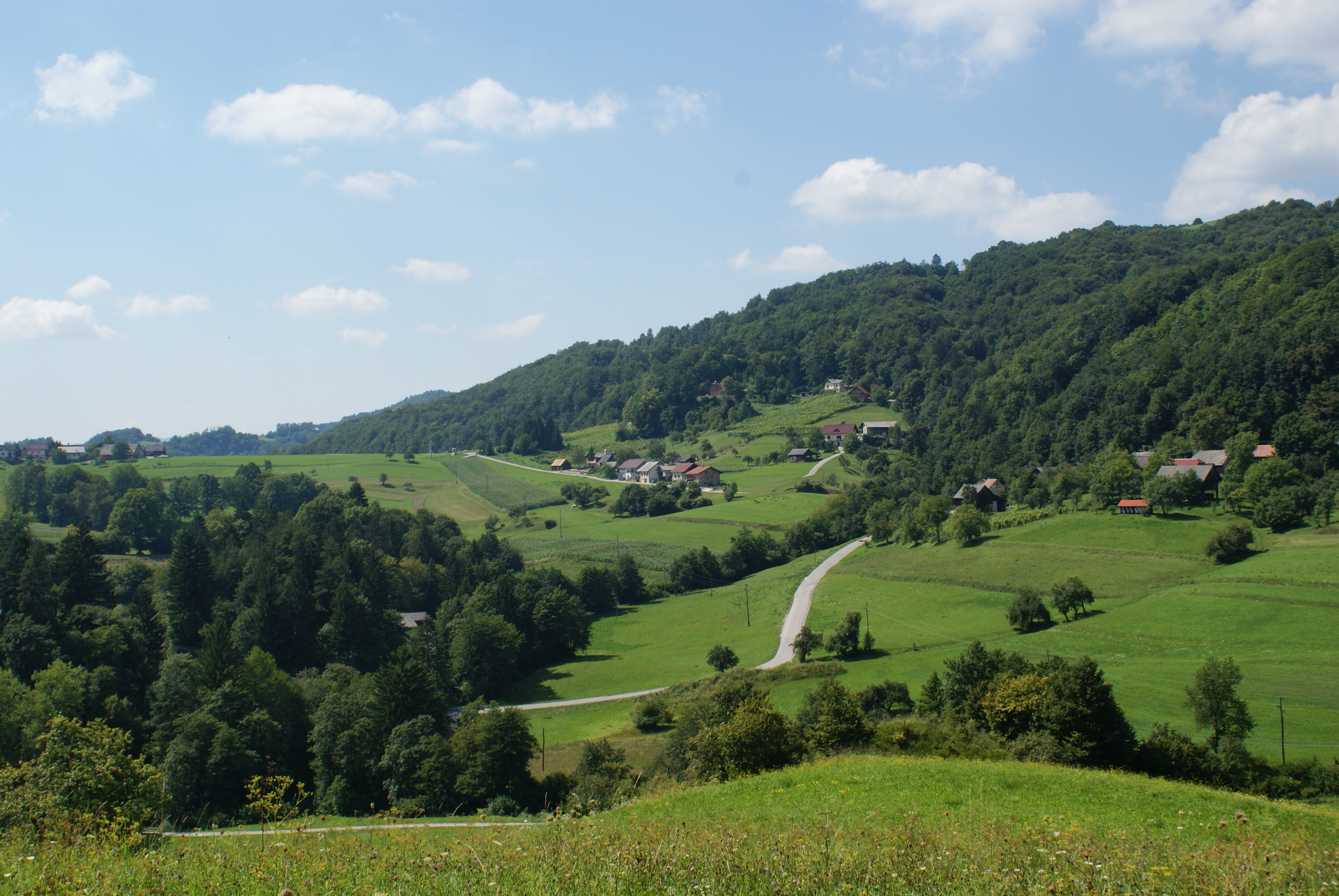

- Location in Slovenia
- Coordinates: 46°1′59.59″N 15°18′40.79″E
- Country: Slovenia
- Traditional region: Styria
- Statistical region: Lower Sava
- Municipality: Sevnica

Area
  - Total: 2.18 km^{2} (0.84 sq mi)
- Elevation: 353.2 m (1,159 ft)

Population (2002)
  - Total: 128

Drožanje (pronounced [dɾɔˈʒaːnjɛ]) is a settlement just north of Sevnica in east-central Slovenia. The area is part of the historical region of Styria. The Municipality of Sevnica is now included in the Lower Sava Statistical Region.

== Churches ==
There are two churches in the settlement. One is a pilgrimage church dedicated to Saint Roch dating to the early 17th century. The second is dedicated to Saint Martin and has a Romanesque nave that was extended in 1737. Both belong to the Parish of Sevnica.
