= Kompolje, Sevnica =

Kompolje
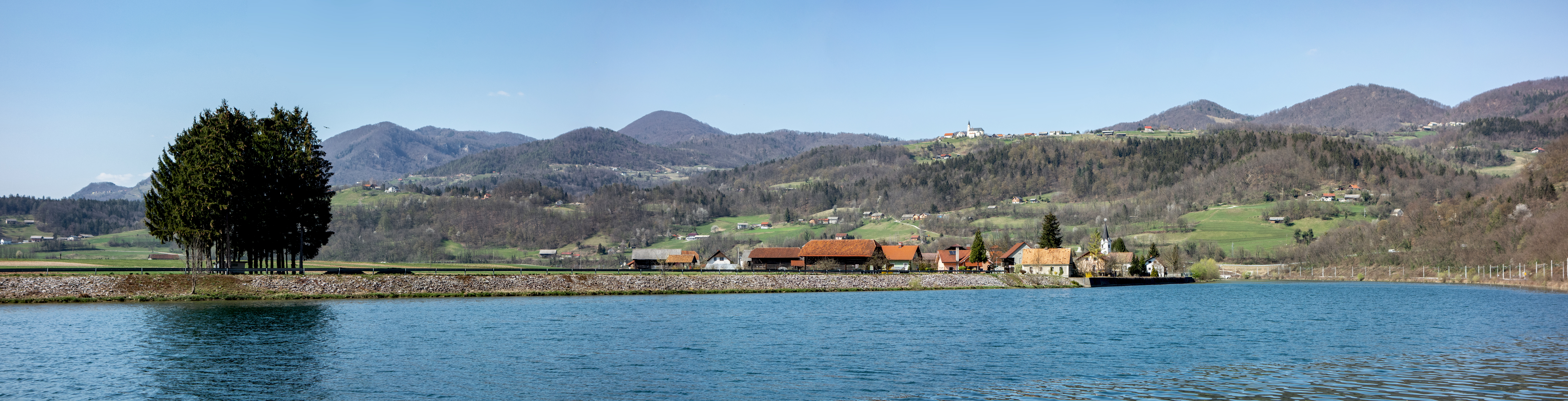

- Location in Slovenia
- Coordinates: 46°2′25.59″N 15°15′59.54″E
- Country: Slovenia
- Traditional region: Lower Carniola
- Statistical region: Lower Sava
- Municipality: Sevnica

Area
  - Total: 1.38 km^{2} (0.53 sq mi)
- Elevation: 183.9 m (603 ft)

Population (2002)
  - Total: 99

Kompolje (pronounced [ˈkoːmpɔljɛ]; German: Gimpel) is a small village on the right bank of the Sava River in the Municipality of Sevnica in central Slovenia. The area is part of the historical region of Lower Carniola. The municipality is now included in the Lower Sava Statistical Region.

The local church is dedicated to Saint Michael and belongs to the Parish of Boštanj. It dates to the 10th century with late 17th- and 18th-century modifications.
