= Ponikve pri Studencu =

- Location in Slovenia
- Coordinates: 45°58′46.91″N 15°21′58.56″E
- Country: Slovenia
- Traditional region: Lower Carniola
- Statistical region: Lower Sava
- Municipality: Sevnica

Area
  - Total: 1.57 km^{2} (0.61 sq mi)
- Elevation: 300.5 m (986 ft)

Population (2002)
  - Total: 69

Ponikve pri Studencu (pronounced [pɔˈniːkʋɛ pɾi stuˈdɛːntsu]) is a small settlement northeast of Studenec in the Municipality of Sevnica in east-central Slovenia. It lies in the hills above the right bank of the Sava River in an area that traditionally belonged to Lower Carniola. The municipality is now included in the Lower Sava Statistical Region.

== Name ==
The name of the settlement was changed from Ponikve to Ponikve pri Studencu in 1953.
