= Podvrh, Sevnica =

Podvrh
- Location in Slovenia
- Coordinates: 46°2′19.1″N 15°21′53.46″E
- Country: Slovenia
- Traditional region: Styria
- Statistical region: Lower Sava
- Municipality: Sevnica

Area
  - Total: 2.76 km^{2} (1.07 sq mi)
- Elevation: 372.9 m (1,223 ft)

Population (2002)
  - Total: 89

Podvrh (pronounced [pɔˈdʋəɾx]) is a settlement in the Municipality of Sevnica in east-central Slovenia. It lies in the hills northeast of Sevnica in an area that is part of the traditional region of Styria. The municipality is now included in the Lower Sava Statistical Region.
