= Znojile pri Studencu =

- Location in Slovenia
- Coordinates: 45°57′53.35″N 15°17′0.93″E
- Country: Slovenia
- Traditional region: Lower Carniola
- Statistical region: Lower Sava
- Municipality: Sevnica

Area
  - Total: 0.33 km^{2} (0.13 sq mi)
- Elevation: 418.8 m (1,374 ft)

Population (2002)
  - Total: 8

Znojile pri Studencu (pronounced [znɔˈjiːlɛ pɾi stuˈdɛːntsu]) is a small settlement in the hills west of Studenec in the Municipality of Sevnica in east-central Slovenia. The area is part of the historical region of Lower Carniola and is now included in the Lower Sava Statistical Region.

== Name ==
The name of the settlement was changed from Znojile to Znojile pri Studencu (literally, 'Znojile near Studenec') in 1955. Znojile was attested in written sources in 1364 as Znogl (and as Snoil in 1423). The name is derived from *znoji(d)lo 'sunny or sun-facing area' from the verb *znojiti 'to be warmed by the sun'. The name therefore refers to the geographical orientation of the place.
