= Gornje Orle =

- Location in Slovenia
- Coordinates: 45°58′49.3″N 15°19′32.69″E
- Country: Slovenia
- Traditional region: Lower Carniola
- Statistical region: Lower Sava
- Municipality: Sevnica

Area
  - Total: 2.13 km^{2} (0.82 sq mi)
- Elevation: 433.5 m (1,422 ft)

Population (2002)
  - Total: 45

Gornje Orle (pronounced [ˈɡoːɾnjɛ ˈoɾːljɛ]; in older sources also Gorenje Orlje, German: Oberorle) is a settlement in the Municipality of Sevnica in central Slovenia. It lies in the hills above the right bank of the Sava River. The area is part of the historical region of Lower Carniola and is now included in the Lower Sava Statistical Region. It includes the hamlets of Orlska Gora (in older sources also Orlje Vinska Gora, German: Weinberg), Buče, and Novo.
