= Trnovec, Sevnica =

Trnovec
- Location in Slovenia
- Coordinates: 46°2′7.57″N 15°22′50.59″E
- Country: Slovenia
- Traditional region: Styria
- Statistical region: Lower Sava
- Municipality: Sevnica

Area
  - Total: 2.06 km^{2} (0.80 sq mi)
- Elevation: 350.1 m (1,149 ft)

Population (2002)
  - Total: 140

Trnovec (pronounced [təɾˈnɔːʋəts] or [təɾˈnoːʋəts]) is a settlement in the hills northeast of Sevnica in east-central Slovenia. The area is part of the historical region of Styria. The Municipality of Sevnica is now included in the Lower Sava Statistical Region.

The local church, built in the northern part of the settlement, is dedicated to Saint George (Slovene: sveti Jurij) and belongs to the Parish of Sevnica. It originally dates to the 14th century with surviving traces of the original Gothic frescos despite major rebuilding in the 17th century.
