= Gornje Brezovo =

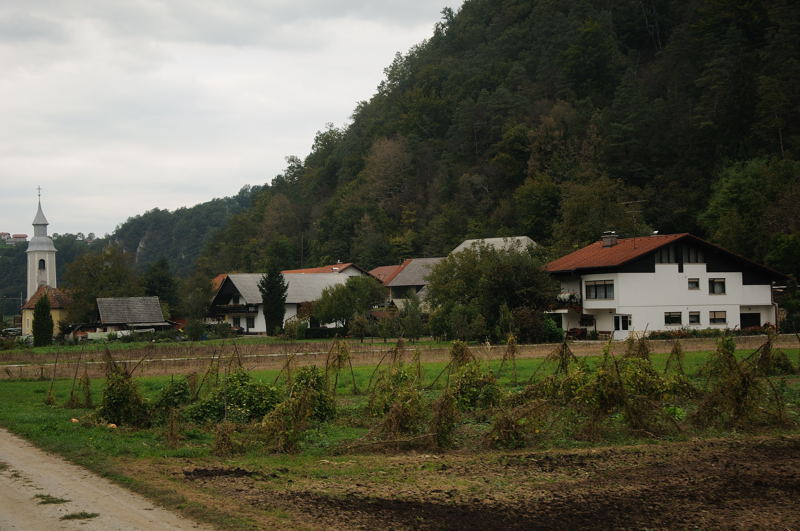

- Location in Slovenia
- Coordinates: 45°59′45.75″N 15°20′52.96″E
- Country: Slovenia
- Traditional region: Styria
- Statistical region: Lower Sava
- Municipality: Sevnica

Area
  - Total: 1.41 km^{2} (0.54 sq mi)
- Elevation: 186.8 m (613 ft)

Population (2002)
  - Total: 80

Gornje Brezovo (pronounced [ˈɡoːɾnjɛ ˈbɾeːzɔʋɔ]) is a settlement in the Municipality of Sevnica in central Slovenia. It lies on the left bank of the Sava River east of Sevnica. The area is part of the historical region of Styria. The municipality is now included in the Lower Sava Statistical Region.

The local church is dedicated to Saint Ulrich and belongs to the Parish of Sevnica. It was built in 1643.
