= Spodnje Mladetiče =

- Location in Slovenia
- Coordinates: 45°58′37.59″N 15°10′0.23″E
- Country: Slovenia
- Traditional region: Styria
- Statistical region: Lower Sava
- Municipality: Sevnica

Area
  - Total: 0.64 km^{2} (0.25 sq mi)
- Elevation: 282.6 m (927 ft)

Population (2002)
  - Total: 48

Spodnje Mladetiče (pronounced [ˈspoːdnjɛ mladɛˈtiːtʃɛ]) is a settlement west of Krmelj in the Municipality of Sevnica in central Slovenia. The area is part of the historical region of Styria and is now included in the Lower Sava Statistical Region.
