= Kladje nad Blanco =

- Location in Slovenia
- Coordinates: 45°59′45.37″N 15°24′25.81″E
- Country: Slovenia
- Traditional region: Styria
- Statistical region: Lower Sava
- Municipality: Sevnica

Area
  - Total: 2.22 km^{2} (0.86 sq mi)
- Elevation: 222 m (728 ft)

Population (2002)
  - Total: 150

Kladje nad Blanco (pronounced [ˈklaːdjɛ nad ˈblaːntsɔ]) is a settlement east of Blanca on the left bank of the Sava River in the Municipality of Sevnica in central Slovenia. The area is part of the historical region of Styria. The municipality is now included in the Lower Sava Statistical Region.

== Name ==
The name of the settlement was changed from Kladje to Kladje nad Blanco in 1953.

== Cultural heritage ==
There are two Iron Age burial mounds near the settlement. Although they do not belong to the same era, local legend associates them with Attila's grave.
