= Dolnje Orle =

- Location in Slovenia
- Coordinates: 46°2′29.43″N 15°13′52.11″E
- Country: Slovenia
- Traditional region: Lower Carniola
- Statistical region: Lower Sava
- Municipality: Sevnica

Area
  - Total: 0.48 km^{2} (0.19 sq mi)
- Elevation: 189 m (620 ft)

Population (2002)
  - Total: 89

Dolnje Orle (pronounced [ˈdoːlnjɛ ˈoːɾlɛ]; in older sources also Dolenje Orlje, German: Unterorle) is a small settlement in the Municipality of Sevnica in central Slovenia. It lies in the hills south of Sevnica in the historical region of Lower Carniola. The municipality is now included in the Lower Sava Statistical Region.
