= Radež =

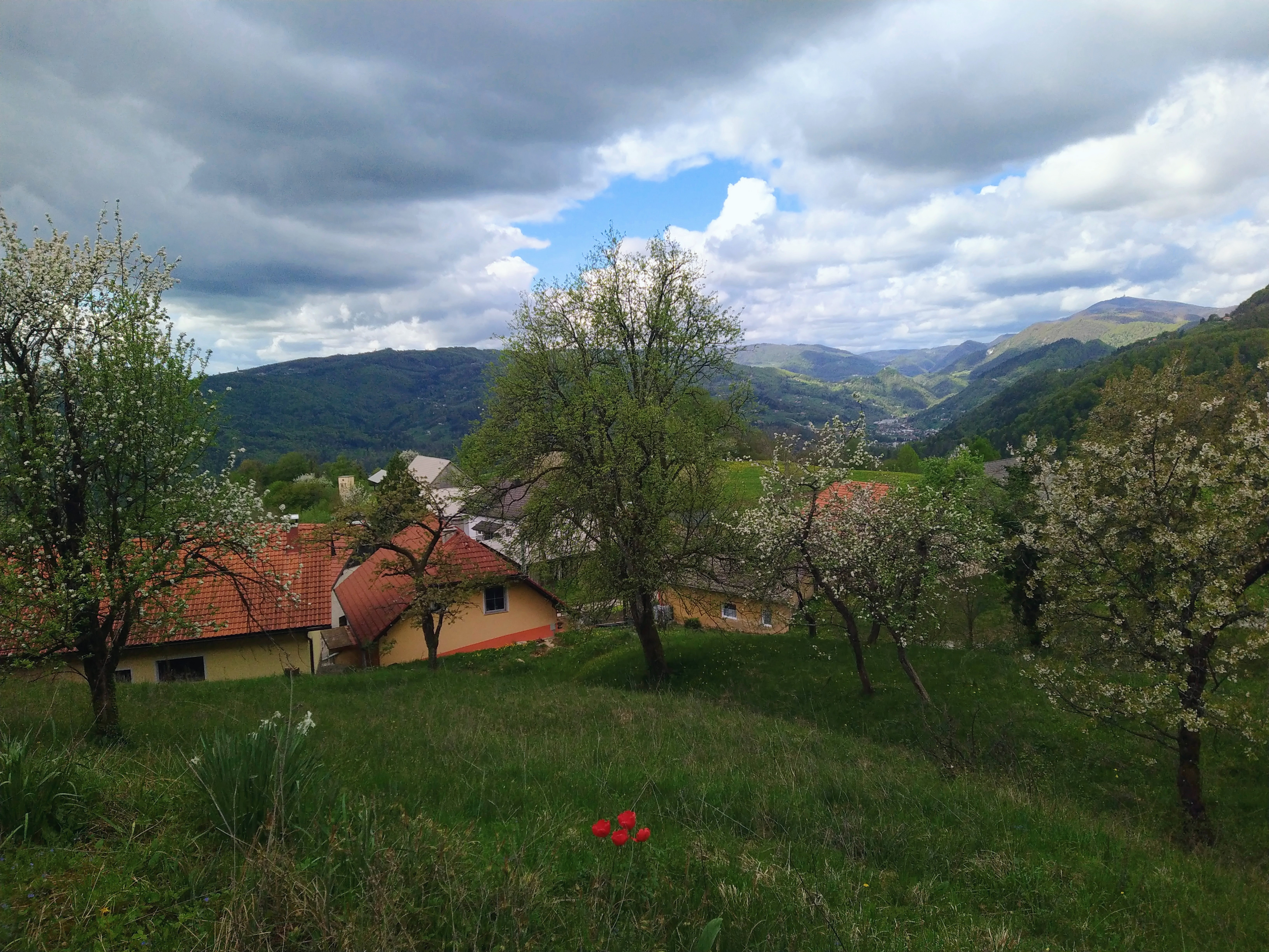

- Location in Slovenia
- Coordinates: 46°3′46.22″N 15°13′43.13″E
- Country: Slovenia
- Traditional region: Styria
- Statistical region: Lower Sava
- Municipality: Sevnica

Area
  - Total: 3.16 km^{2} (1.22 sq mi)
- Elevation: 448.8 m (1,472 ft)

Population (2002)
  - Total: 126

Radež (pronounced [ˈɾaːdɛʃ]) is a settlement in the hills above the left bank of the Sava River in the Municipality of Sevnica in east central Slovenia. The area is part of the historical region of Styria. The municipality is now included in the Lower Sava Statistical Region.

The local church is dedicated to Saints Fabian and Sebastian and belongs to the Parish of Loka pri Zidanem Mostu. It is a medieval building that was greatly rebuilt at various stages over the centuries.
