= Budna Vas =

- Location in Slovenia
- Coordinates: 46°2′5.4″N 15°11′29.23″E
- Country: Slovenia
- Traditional region: Lower Carniola
- Statistical region: Lower Sava
- Municipality: Sevnica

Area
  - Total: 1.98 km^{2} (0.76 sq mi)
- Elevation: 509 m (1,670 ft)

Population (2002)
  - Total: 87

Budna Vas (pronounced [ˈbuːdna ˈʋaːs]; Slovene: Budna vas) is a settlement in the Municipality of Sevnica in central Slovenia. The area is part of the historical region of Lower Carniola. The municipality is now included in the Lower Sava Statistical Region.

== Name ==
Budna Vas was attested in historical sources as Budendorff c. 1420, as Wudendorff in 1483, and as Wudyna vas in 1502. Like the related names Budina (a neighborhood of Ptuj) and Budno (a hamlet of Jelovice), the name is derived from the nickname *Buda (which is preserved as a surname in Slovenia), thus meaning 'Buda's village'.

== Church ==
St. Nicholas's Church

The local church is dedicated to Saint Nicholas and belongs to the Parish of Šentjanž. It dates to the 17th century and has a single-aisled nave with a flat wooden ceiling.
