= Jablanica, Sevnica =

Jablanica
- Location in Slovenia
- Coordinates: 46°0′36.19″N 15°12′45.62″E
- Country: Slovenia
- Traditional region: Lower Carniola
- Statistical region: Lower Sava
- Municipality: Sevnica

Area
  - Total: 6.42 km^{2} (2.48 sq mi)
- Elevation: 408.6 m (1,341 ft)

Population (2002)
  - Total: 121

Jablanica (pronounced [ˈjaːblanitsa]) is a dispersed settlement in the hills west of Boštanj in the Municipality of Sevnica in central Slovenia. The area is part of the historical region of Lower Carniola. The municipality is now included in the Lower Sava Statistical Region. During World War II, the village was occupied by the Germans, who renamed it Apfalter.
