= Rogačice =

- Location in Slovenia
- Coordinates: 45°58′10.17″N 15°17′8.91″E
- Country: Slovenia
- Traditional region: Lower Carniola
- Statistical region: Lower Sava
- Municipality: Sevnica

Area
  - Total: 1.16 km^{2} (0.45 sq mi)
- Elevation: 506.6 m (1,662 ft)

Population (2002)
  - Total: 51

Rogačice (pronounced [ɾɔɡaˈtʃiːtsɛ]; in older sources also Rogačica) is a small village in the hills south of Boštanj in the Municipality of Sevnica in east-central Slovenia. The area is part of the historical region of Lower Carniola and is now included in the Lower Sava Statistical Region.
