= Žirovnica, Sevnica =

Žirovnica
- Location in Slovenia
- Coordinates: 46°4′28.36″N 15°13′26.08″E
- Country: Slovenia
- Traditional region: Styria
- Statistical region: Lower Sava
- Municipality: Sevnica

Area
  - Total: 3.44 km^{2} (1.33 sq mi)
- Elevation: 521.8 m (1,712 ft)

Population (2002)
  - Total: 34

Žirovnica (pronounced [ʒiˈɾoːu̯nitsa]) is a small settlement in the hills north of Loka pri Zidanem Mostu in the Municipality of Sevnica in east-central Slovenia. The area is part of the historical region of Styria and is now included in the Lower Sava Statistical Region with the rest of the municipality.
