= Jeperjek =

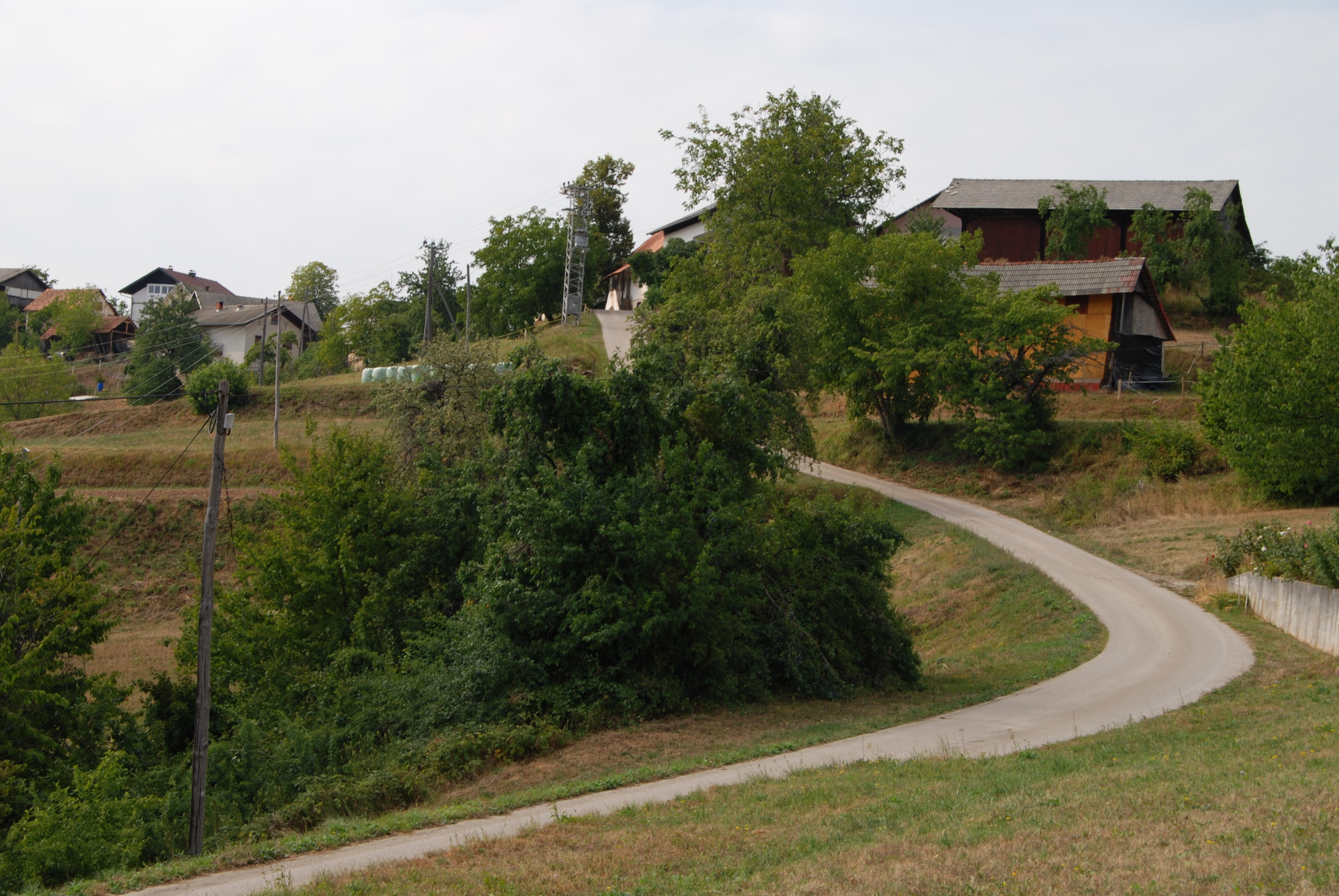

- Location in Slovenia
- Coordinates: 45°57′19.92″N 15°15′8.84″E
- Country: Slovenia
- Traditional region: Lower Carniola
- Statistical region: Lower Sava
- Municipality: Sevnica

Area
  - Total: 1.24 km^{2} (0.48 sq mi)
- Elevation: 424.2 m (1,392 ft)

Population (2002)
  - Total: 89

Jeperjek (pronounced [ˈjeːpɛɾjɛk]) is a small settlement in the hills southwest of Boštanj in the Municipality of Sevnica in central Slovenia. The part of the municipality on the right bank of the Sava River is part of the traditional region of Lower Carniola. The entire municipality is now included in the Lower Sava Statistical Region.
