= Lukovec, Sevnica =

Lukovec
- Location in Slovenia
- Coordinates: 45°59′27.06″N 15°18′25.06″E
- Country: Slovenia
- Traditional region: Lower Carniola
- Statistical region: Lower Sava
- Municipality: Sevnica

Area
  - Total: 1.96 km^{2} (0.76 sq mi)
- Elevation: 316.4 m (1,038 ft)

Population (2002)
  - Total: 187

Lukovec (pronounced [ˈluːkɔʋəts]) is a small settlement in the Municipality of Sevnica in east-central Slovenia. It lies above the right bank of the Sava River east of Boštanj. The area is part of the historical region of Lower Carniola. The municipality is now included in the Lower Sava Statistical Region.

The local church is dedicated to Mary Magdalene and belongs to the Parish of Boštanj. It is originally a Romanesque building that was restyled in the Baroque in the 17th century and extended in 1888.
