= Vrhek =

- Location in Slovenia
- Coordinates: 45°58′4.7″N 15°11′48.37″E
- Country: Slovenia
- Traditional region: Lower Carniola
- Statistical region: Lower Sava
- Municipality: Sevnica

Area
  - Total: 2.69 km^{2} (1.04 sq mi)
- Elevation: 241.9 m (794 ft)

Population (2012)
  - Total: 110
  - Density: 41/km^{2} (110/sq mi)

Vrhek (pronounced [ˈʋəɾxɛk]) is a settlement in the Municipality of Sevnica in east central Slovenia. It lies in the hills above the left bank of the Mirna River southeast of Krmelj. The area is part of the historical region of Lower Carniola. The municipality is now included in the Lower Sava Statistical Region.
