= Zavratec, Sevnica =

Zavratec
- Location in Slovenia
- Coordinates: 45°57′32.69″N 15°20′28.43″E
- Country: Slovenia
- Traditional region: Lower Carniola
- Statistical region: Lower Sava
- Municipality: Sevnica

Area
  - Total: 2.25 km^{2} (0.87 sq mi)
- Elevation: 311.5 m (1,022 ft)

Population (2002)
  - Total: 78

Zavratec (pronounced [zaˈwɾaːtəts]) is a small village southwest of Studenec in the Municipality of Sevnica in east-central Slovenia. The area is part of the historical region of Lower Carniola and is now included in the Lower Sava Statistical Region.
