= Drušče =

- Location in Slovenia
- Coordinates: 45°58′7.73″N 15°16′5.73″E
- Country: Slovenia
- Traditional region: Lower Carniola
- Statistical region: Lower Sava
- Municipality: Sevnica

Area
  - Total: 3.2 km^{2} (1.2 sq mi)
- Elevation: 473 m (1,552 ft)

Population (2002)
  - Total: 66

Drušče (pronounced [ˈdɾuːʃtʃɛ]) is a settlement in the hills south of Boštanj in the Municipality of Sevnica in central Slovenia. The area is part of the historical region of Lower Carniola. The municipality is now included in the Lower Sava Statistical Region.

The local church is dedicated to Saint Barbara and belongs to the Parish of Škocjan pri Novem Mestu. It dates to the 17th century.
