= Orehovo =

- Orehovo in 2026, viewed from Boštanj Castle

- Location in Slovenia
- Coordinates: 46°1′33.12″N 15°15′57.89″E
- Country: Slovenia
- Traditional region: Styria
- Statistical region: Lower Sava
- Municipality: Sevnica

Area
  - Total: 2.53 km^{2} (0.98 sq mi)
- Elevation: 187.5 m (615 ft)

Population (2002)
  - Total: 244

Orehovo (pronounced [ɔˈɾeːxɔʋɔ]) is a settlement in the Municipality of Sevnica in central Slovenia. It lies on the left bank of the Sava River northwest of Sevnica. The area is part of the traditional region of Lower Styria. The municipality is now included in the Lower Sava Statistical Region.
