= Novi Grad, Sevnica =

Novi Grad
- Location in Slovenia
- Coordinates: 46°1′29.62″N 15°12′53.27″E
- Country: Slovenia
- Traditional region: Lower Carniola
- Statistical region: Lower Sava
- Municipality: Sevnica

Area
  - Total: 2.63 km^{2} (1.02 sq mi)
- Elevation: 471.7 m (1,548 ft)

Population (2002)
  - Total: 43

Novi Grad (pronounced [ˈnɔːʋi ˈɡɾaːt]; German: Obererkenstein) is a small settlement in the Municipality of Sevnica in central Slovenia. It lies in the hills south of Vrhovo. The area is part of the historical region of Lower Carniola and is now included in the Lower Sava Statistical Region.
