= Vranje, Sevnica =

Vranje
- Location in Slovenia
- Coordinates: 46°2′6.31″N 15°20′59.42″E
- Country: Slovenia
- Traditional region: Styria
- Statistical region: Lower Sava
- Municipality: Sevnica

Area
  - Total: 1.89 km^{2} (0.73 sq mi)
- Elevation: 287.4 m (943 ft)

Population (2002)
  - Total: 89

Vranje (pronounced [wɾaˈnjɛ]) is a settlement in the Municipality of Sevnica in central Slovenia. It lies in the hills northeast of Sevnica in the historical region of Styria. The municipality is now included in the Lower Sava Statistical Region.

The local church is dedicated to Saint Stephen and belongs to the Parish of Sevnica. It dates to the 17th century.
