= Kal pri Krmelju =

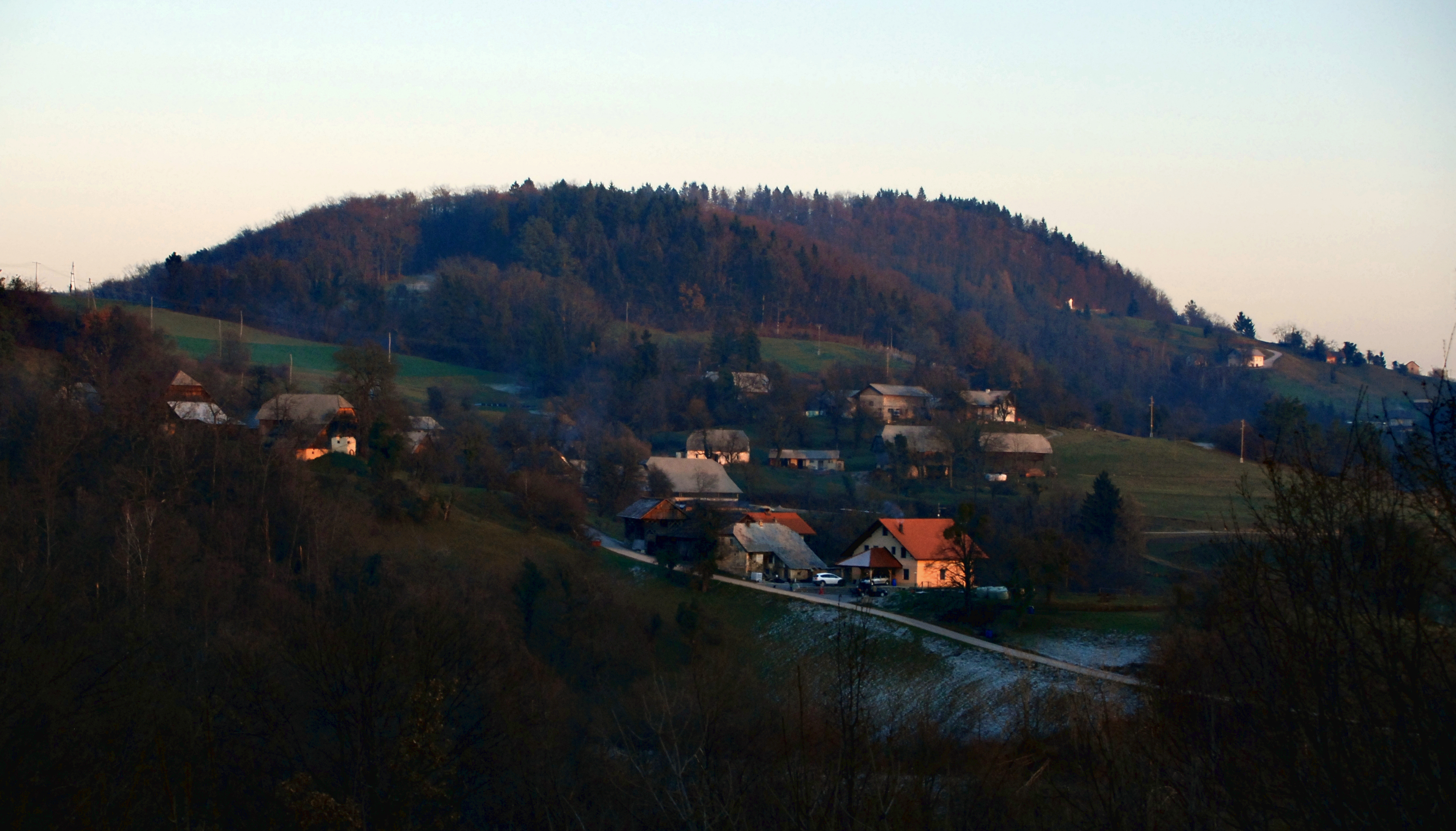

- Location in Slovenia
- Coordinates: 46°1′19.45″N 15°7′2.18″E
- Country: Slovenia
- Traditional region: Lower Carniola
- Statistical region: Lower Sava
- Municipality: Sevnica

Area
  - Total: 2.82 km^{2} (1.09 sq mi)
- Elevation: 503.9 m (1,653 ft)

Population (2012)
  - Total: 60
  - Density: 21/km^{2} (54/sq mi)

Kal pri Krmelju (pronounced [ˈkaːu̯ pɾi kəɾˈmeːlju]) is a small settlement in the Municipality of Sevnica in central Slovenia. The area is part of the historical region of Lower Carniola. The municipality is now included in the Lower Sava Statistical Region.

== Name ==
The name of the settlement was changed from Kal to Kal pri Krmelju in 1955.

== Church ==
The local church is dedicated to Saint Martin and belongs to the Parish of Šentjanž. It was first mentioned in written documents dating to 1526.
