= Šentjur na Polju =

Šentjur na Polju Sveti Jurij pri Loki (until 1955)
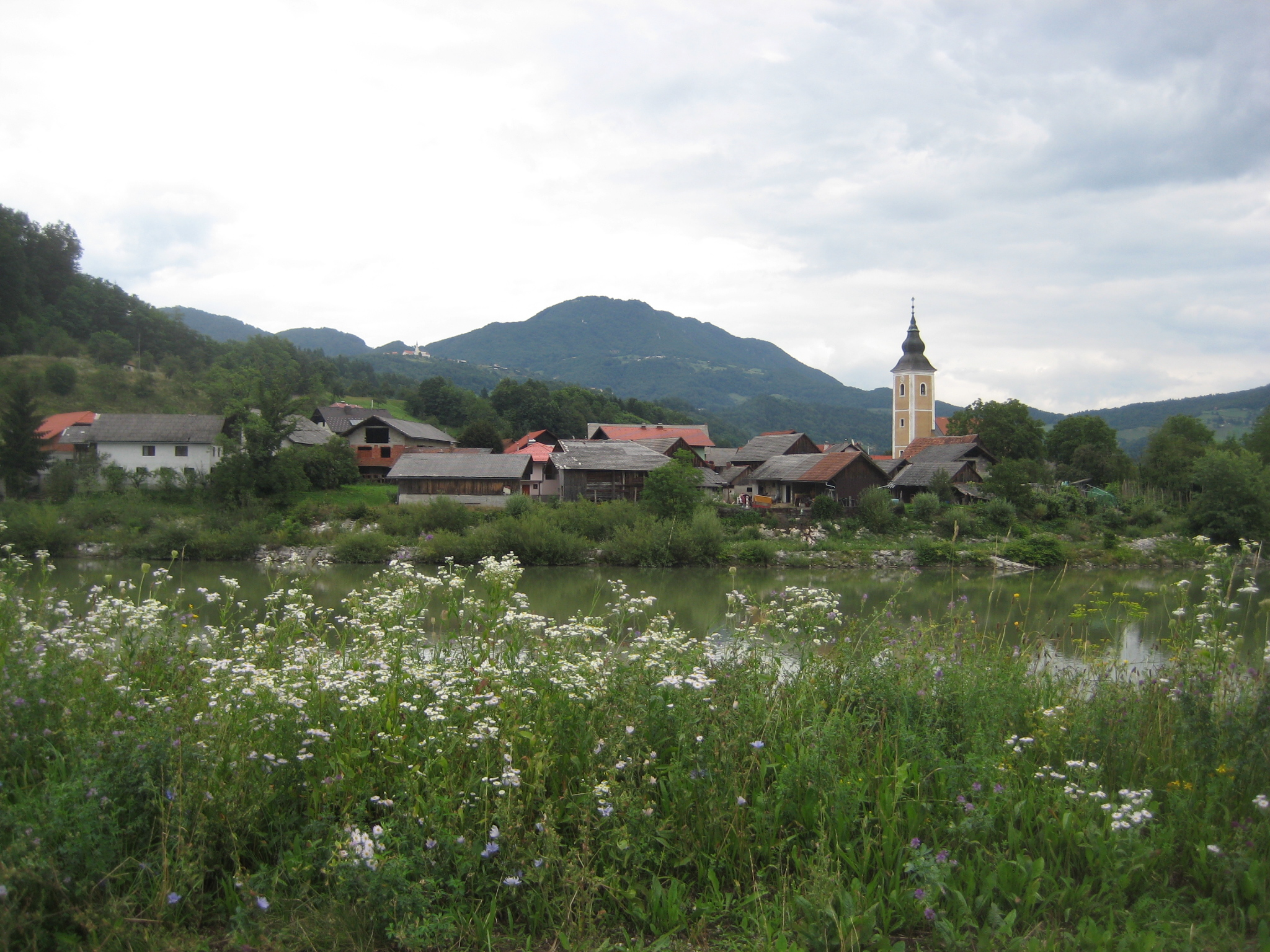

- Location in Slovenia
- Coordinates: 46°2′29.43″N 15°13′52.11″E
- Country: Slovenia
- Traditional region: Styria
- Statistical region: Lower Sava
- Municipality: Sevnica

Area
  - Total: 0.94 km^{2} (0.36 sq mi)
- Elevation: 189 m (620 ft)

Population (2002)
  - Total: 89

Šentjur na Polju (pronounced [sɛnˈtjuːɾ na ˈpoːlju]) is a small village on the left bank of the Sava River in the Municipality of Sevnica in central Slovenia. The area is part of the historical region of Styria. The municipality is now included in the Lower Sava Statistical Region.

== Name ==
The name of the settlement was changed from Sveti Jurij pri Loki (literally, 'Saint George near Loka') to Šentjur na Polju in 1955.

== Church ==
The local church from which the settlement gets its name is dedicated to Saint George (Slovene: sveti Jurij, contracted to Šentjur) and belongs to the Parish of Loka pri Zidanem Mostu. It is a medieval building with a Romanesque floor plan that was restyled in the Baroque in the 17th century.
