= Mrtovec =

- Location in Slovenia
- Coordinates: 46°2′1.83″N 15°14′26.41″E
- Country: Slovenia
- Traditional region: Lower Carniola
- Statistical region: Lower Sava
- Municipality: Sevnica

Area
  - Total: 2.28 km^{2} (0.88 sq mi)
- Elevation: 320.5 m (1,052 ft)

Population (2002)
  - Total: 56

Mrtovec (pronounced [ˈməɾtɔʋəts]) is a settlement in the Municipality of Sevnica in central Slovenia. It lies northwest of Boštanj, above the right bank of the Sava River. The area is part of the historical region of Lower Carniola. The municipality is now included in the Lower Sava Statistical Region. The settlement includes the hamlet of Lisičje Jame (German: Fuchsgraben).
