= Trščina =

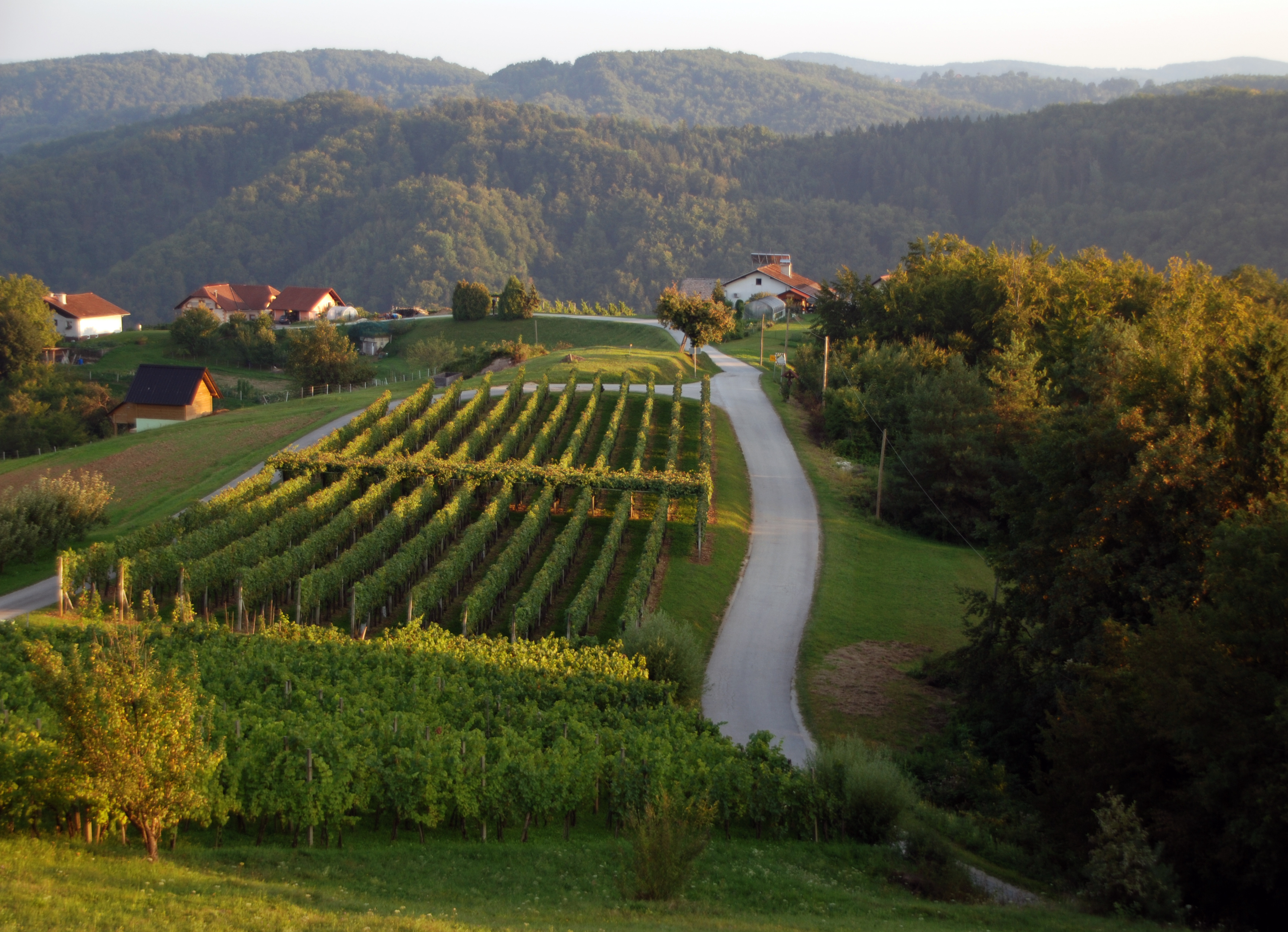
- Trščina, lower part (August 2016)

- Location in Slovenia
- Coordinates: 45°56′1.2″N 15°12′37.14″E
- Country: Slovenia
- Traditional region: Lower Carniola
- Statistical region: Lower Sava
- Municipality: Sevnica

Area
  - Total: 1.48 km^{2} (0.57 sq mi)
- Elevation: 58 m (190 ft)

Population (2002)
  - Total: 58

Trščina (pronounced [təɾˈʃtʃiːna]) is a small settlement in the Municipality of Sevnica in east-central Slovenia. It lies in the hills east of Mokronog and south of Tržišče. The area is part of the historical region of Lower Carniola. The municipality is now included in the Lower Sava Statistical Region.
