= Apnenik pri Boštanju =

- Location in Slovenia
- Coordinates: 46°1′0.16″N 15°15′22.86″E
- Country: Slovenia
- Traditional region: Lower Carniola
- Statistical region: Lower Sava
- Municipality: Sevnica

Area
  - Total: 2.23 km^{2} (0.86 sq mi)
- Elevation: 405.8 m (1,331 ft)

Population (2002)
  - Total: 30

Apnenik pri Boštanju (pronounced [apˈneːnik pɾi bɔˈʃtaːnju]; German: Kalchberg) is a settlement to the west of Boštanj in the Municipality of Sevnica in central Slovenia. The area is part of the historical region of Lower Carniola. The municipality is now included in the Lower Sava Statistical Region.

== Name ==
The name of the settlement was changed from Apnenik to Apnenik pri Boštanju in 1953. In the past the German name was Kalchberg.

== History ==
The remains of medieval Sawenstein Castle can be found on Vetrnik Hill to west of the settlement. It was first mentioned in written documents dating to the 12th century, but was likely built in the 11th century. It was abandoned in the 17th century.
