= Dolnje Brezovo =

- Location in Slovenia
- Coordinates: 45°59′40.4″N 15°21′47.76″E
- Country: Slovenia
- Traditional region: Styria
- Statistical region: Lower Sava
- Municipality: Sevnica

Area
  - Total: 2.03 km^{2} (0.78 sq mi)
- Elevation: 174.4 m (572 ft)

Population (2002)
  - Total: 135

Dolnje Brezovo (pronounced [ˈdoːlnjɛ ˈbɾeːzɔʋɔ]) is a small village on the left bank of the Sava River in the Municipality of Sevnica in central Slovenia. The area is part of the historical region of Lower Styria. The municipality is now included in the Lower Sava Statistical Region.

The local church is dedicated to John the Baptist and belongs to the Parish of Sevnica. It was built in 1763 on the site of an earlier building with parts of the original nave incorporated into the new structure.
