= Krajna Brda =

- Location in Slovenia
- Coordinates: 46°0′27.58″N 15°23′57.77″E
- Country: Slovenia
- Traditional region: Styria
- Statistical region: Lower Sava
- Municipality: Sevnica

Area
  - Total: 1.71 km^{2} (0.66 sq mi)
- Elevation: 300.9 m (987 ft)

Population (2002)
  - Total: 76

Krajna Brda (pronounced [ˈkɾaːi̯na ˈbəɾda]) is a small settlement in the hills north of Blanca in the Municipality of Sevnica in eastern Slovenia. The area is part of the historical region of Styria. The municipality is now included in the Lower Sava Statistical Region.
