= Štajngrob =

- Location in Slovenia
- Coordinates: 46°0′59.29″N 15°8′9.55″E
- Country: Slovenia
- Traditional region: Lower Carniola
- Statistical region: Lower Sava
- Municipality: Sevnica

Area
  - Total: 1.76 km^{2} (0.68 sq mi)
- Elevation: 460.5 m (1,511 ft)

Population (2002)
  - Total: 36

Štajngrob (pronounced [ˈʃtaːi̯nɡɾɔp]; in older sources also Steingrab) is a small settlement west of Šentjanž in the Municipality of Sevnica in east-central Slovenia. The area is part of the historical region of Lower Carniola. The municipality is now included in the Lower Sava Statistical Region.
