= Dolnje Impolje =

- Location in Slovenia
- Coordinates: 45°58′17.63″N 15°19′6.02″E
- Country: Slovenia
- Traditional region: Lower Carniola
- Statistical region: Lower Sava
- Municipality: Sevnica

Area
  - Total: 0.6 km^{2} (0.23 sq mi)
- Elevation: 358.4 m (1,176 ft)

Population (2002)
  - Total: 29

Dolnje Impolje (pronounced [ˈdoːlnjɛ ˈiːmpɔljɛ]; in older sources also Dolenje Impole, German: Unterimpelhof) is a small settlement in the Sava Hills (Slovene: Posavsko hribovje) in the Municipality of Sevnica in central Slovenia. The area is part of the historical region of Lower Carniola and is now included in the Lower Sava Statistical Region.
