= Okroglice =

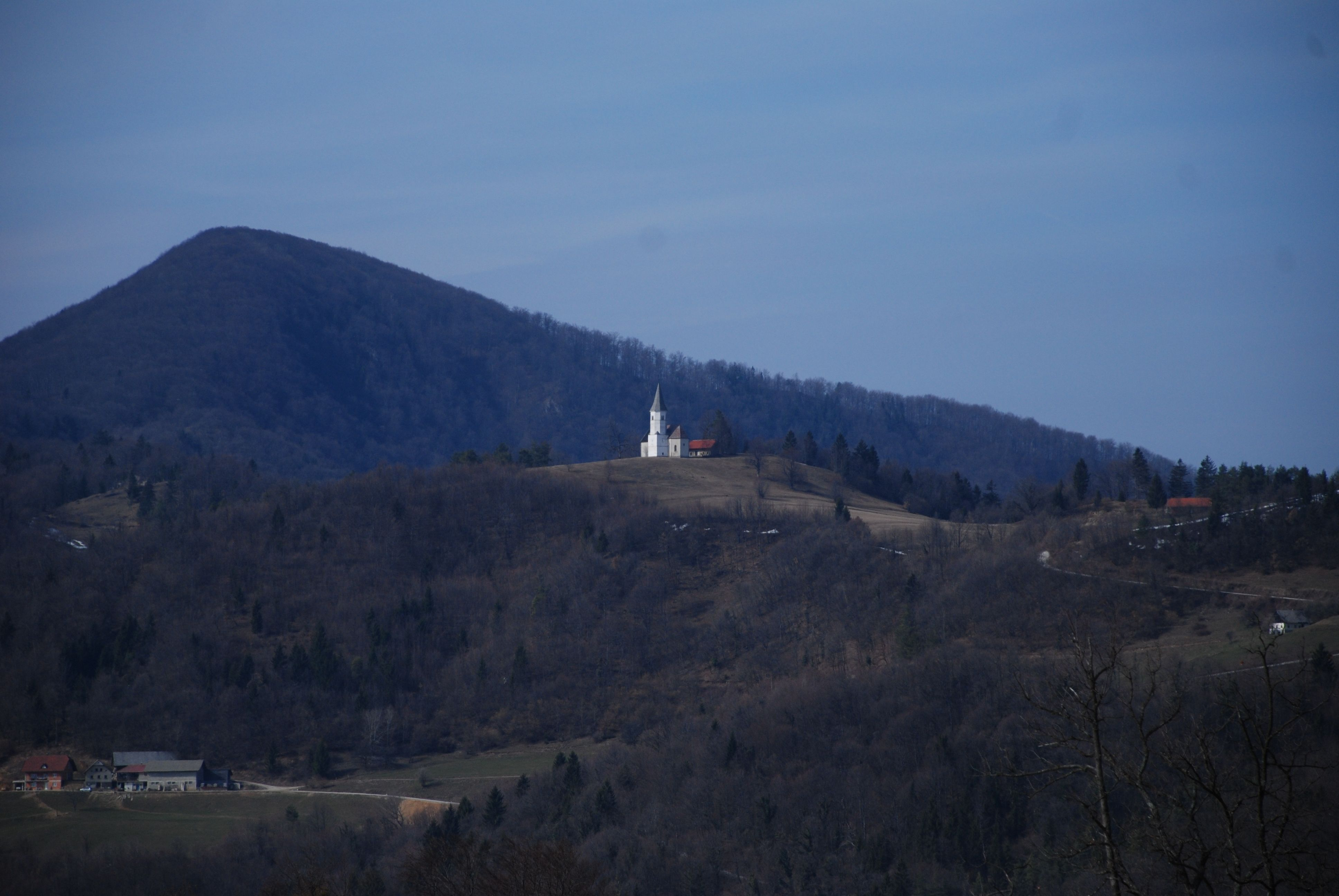
- St. Lawrence's Church in Okroglice. Big Kozje Hill in the background.

- Location in Slovenia
- Coordinates: 46°4′3.17″N 15°15′23.72″E
- Country: Slovenia
- Traditional region: Styria
- Statistical region: Lower Sava
- Municipality: Sevnica

Area
  - Total: 3.66 km^{2} (1.41 sq mi)
- Elevation: 417.2 m (1,369 ft)

Population (2002)
  - Total: 85

Okroglice (pronounced [ɔˈkɾoːɡlitsɛ]) is a settlement in the hills northeast of Loka pri Zidanem Mostu in the Municipality of Sevnica in east-central Slovenia. The area is part of the historical region of Styria. The municipality is now included in the Lower Sava Statistical Region.

The local church is dedicated to Saint Lawrence and belongs to the Parish of Razbor. It dates to the early 18th century.
