= Municipality of Sevnica =

Municipality of Slovenia

Municipality of Sevnica Občina Sevnica
- Municipality
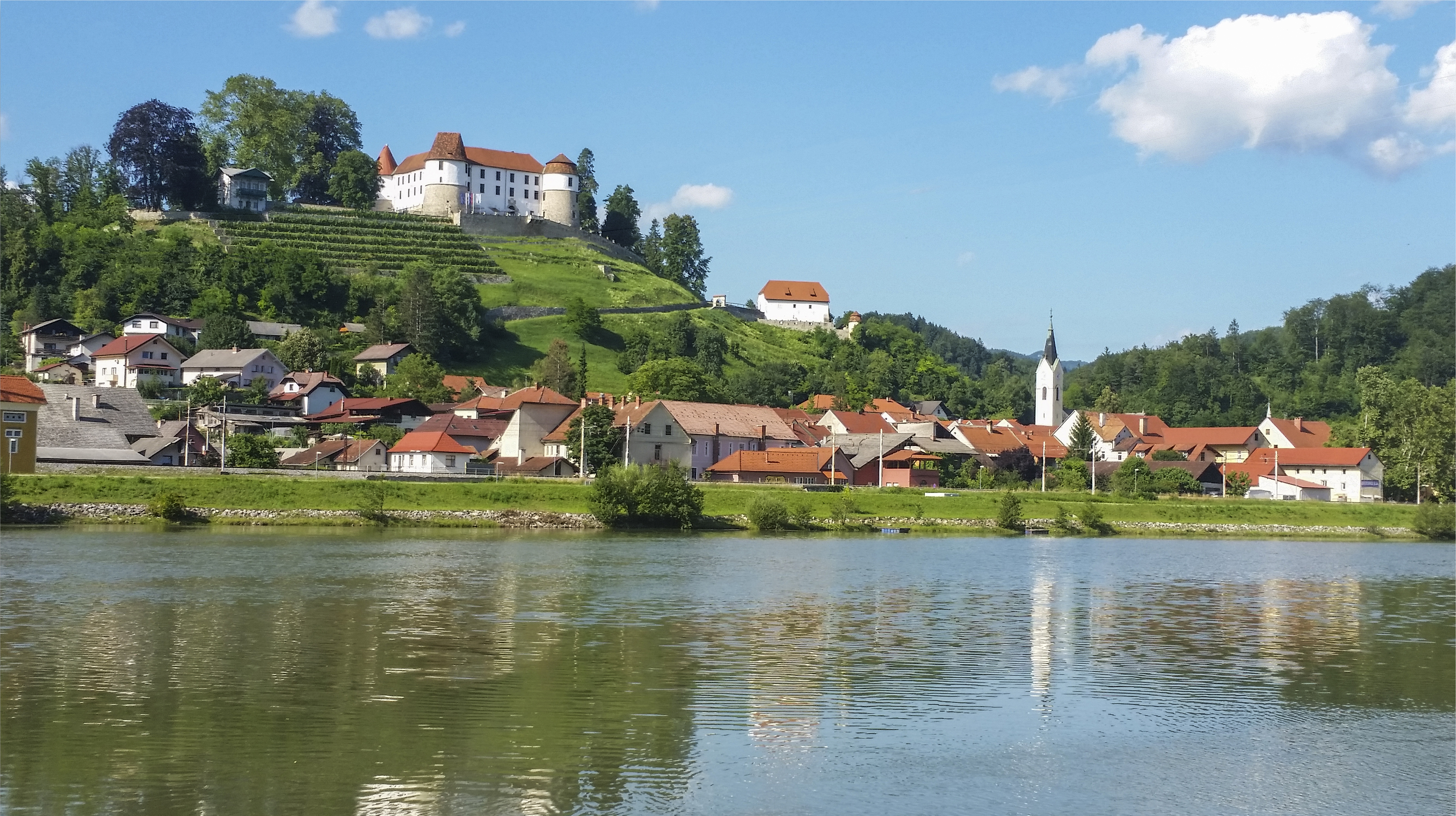

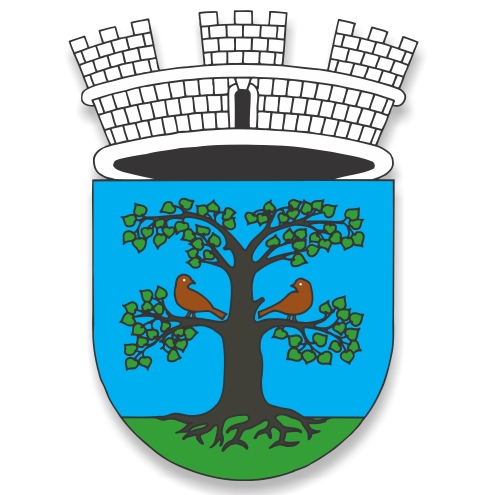
- Coat of arms

- Location of the Municipality of Sevnica in Slovenia
- Coordinates: 46°00′N 15°18′E
- Country: Slovenia

Government
  - Mayor: Srečko Ocvirk

Area
  - Total: 272.17 km^{2} (105.09 sq mi)

Population (2010)
  - Total: 17,631
  - Density: 64.779/km^{2} (167.78/sq mi)
- Time zone: UTC+01 (CET)
  - Summer (DST): UTC+02 (CEST)
- Website: www.obcina-sevnica.si

The Municipality of Sevnica (Slovene: Občina Sevnica) is a municipality along the Sava and the Mirna Rivers in southeastern Slovenia. The seat of the municipality is the town of Sevnica. Today it is part of the Lower Sava Statistical Region. It is the 12th-largest municipality by area in Slovenia.

== Settlements ==
In addition to the municipal seat of Sevnica, the municipality also includes the following settlements:

- Apnenik pri Boštanju
- Arto
- Birna Vas
- Blanca
- Boštanj
- Breg
- Brezje
- Brezovo
- Budna Vas
- Čanje
- Čelovnik
- Cerovec
- Češnjice
- Dedna Gora
- Dolenji Boštanj
- Dolnje Brezovo
- Dolnje Impolje
- Dolnje Orle
- Drožanje
- Drušče
- Gabrijele
- Gabrje
- Gornje Brezovo
- Gornje Impolje
- Gornje Orle
- Goveji Dol
- Hinjce
- Hinje
- Hudo Brezje
- Jablanica
- Jelovec
- Jeperjek
- Kal pri Krmelju
- Kamenica
- Kamenško
- Kaplja Vas
- Kladje nad Blanco
- Kladje pri Krmelju
- Koludrje
- Kompolje
- Konjsko
- Krajna Brda
- Križ
- Križišče
- Krmelj
- Krsinji Vrh
- Laze pri Boštanju
- Ledina
- Leskovec v Podborštu
- Log
- Loka pri Zidanem Mostu
- Lončarjev Dol
- Lukovec
- Mala Hubajnica
- Malkovec
- Marendol
- Metni Vrh
- Mrtovec
- Mrzla Planina
- Novi Grad
- Okroglice
- Orehovo
- Orešje nad Sevnico
- Osredek pri Hubajnici
- Osredek pri Krmelju
- Otavnik
- Pavla Vas
- Pečje
- Pijavice
- Podboršt
- Podgorica
- Podgorje ob Sevnični
- Podvrh
- Poklek nad Blanco
- Polje pri Tržišču
- Ponikve pri Studencu
- Preska
- Prešna Loka
- Primož
- Račica
- Radež
- Radna
- Razbor
- Rogačice
- Rovišče pri Studencu
- Selce nad Blanco
- Šentjanž
- Šentjur na Polju
- Škovec
- Skrovnik
- Slančji Vrh
- Slap
- Šmarčna
- Spodnje Mladetiče
- Spodnje Vodale
- Srednik
- Štajngrob
- Stržišče
- Studenec
- Svinjsko
- Telče
- Telčice
- Trnovec
- Trščina
- Tržišče
- Velika Hubajnica
- Veliki Cirnik
- Vranje
- Vrh pri Boštanju
- Vrhek
- Zabukovje nad Sevnico
- Zavratec
- Zgornje Mladetiče
- Zgornje Vodale
- Žigrski Vrh
- Žirovnica
- Znojile pri Studencu
- Žurkov Dol

== Notable people ==
Notable people from the Municipality of Sevnica include the model Melanija Knavs (married Melania Trump), the handball player Matjaž Mlakar, the historian Janko Prunk (from Loka pri Zidanem Mostu), and the writer Ludvik Mrzel (also from Loka pri Zidanem Mostu).
