= Leskovec v Podborštu =

- Location in Slovenia
- Coordinates: 46°2′12.72″N 15°9′26.94″E
- Country: Slovenia
- Traditional region: Lower Carniola
- Statistical region: Lower Sava
- Municipality: Sevnica

Area
  - Total: 3.35 km^{2} (1.29 sq mi)
- Elevation: 699.4 m (2,295 ft)

Population (2002)
  - Total: 64

Leskovec v Podborštu (pronounced [lɛˈskɔːʋəts ʍ pɔdˈboːrʃtu]) is a settlement in the Municipality of Sevnica in central Slovenia. The area is part of the historical region of Lower Carniola. The municipality is now included in the Lower Sava Statistical Region.

== Name ==
The name of the settlement was changed from Leskovec to Leskovec v Podborštu in 1953.

== Church ==
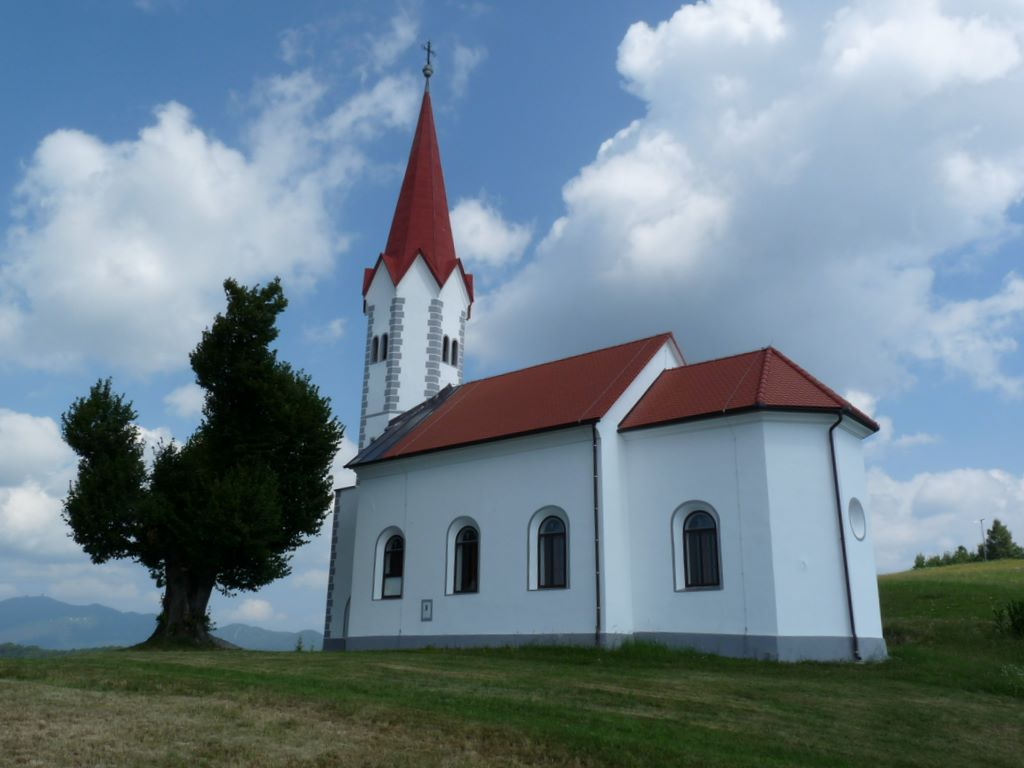
Our Lady of Sorrows Church

The local church is dedicated to Our Lady of Sorrows (Slovene: Žalostna Mati božja) and belongs to the Parish of Šentjanž. It dates to the 17th century and stands on Leskovec Hill.
