= Konjsko, Sevnica =

Konjsko
- Location in Slovenia
- Coordinates: 45°59′41.42″N 15°17′46.1″E
- Country: Slovenia
- Traditional region: Lower Carniola
- Statistical region: Lower Sava
- Municipality: Sevnica

Area
  - Total: 1.42 km^{2} (0.55 sq mi)
- Elevation: 316.1 m (1,037 ft)

Population (2002)
  - Total: 72

Konjsko (pronounced [ˈkoːnskɔ]; German: Roßbach) is a small settlement in the hills above the right bank of the Sava River south of Boštanj in the Municipality of Sevnica in central Slovenia. The area is part of the historical region of Lower Carniola. The municipality is now included in the Lower Sava Statistical Region.
