= Poklek nad Blanco =

- Location in Slovenia
- Coordinates: 46°1′47.3″N 15°23′44.86″E
- Country: Slovenia
- Traditional region: Styria
- Statistical region: Lower Sava
- Municipality: Sevnica

Area
  - Total: 6.28 km^{2} (2.42 sq mi)
- Elevation: 352.9 m (1,158 ft)

Population (2002)
  - Total: 209

Poklek nad Blanco (pronounced [ˈpɔːklɛk nad ˈblaːntsɔ]) is a settlement in the hills north of Blanca in the Municipality of Sevnica in central Slovenia. The area is part of the historical region of Styria. The municipality is now included in the Lower Sava Statistical Region.

== Name ==
The name of the settlement was changed from Poklek to Poklek nad Blanco in 1953.

== Church ==
The local church is dedicated to the feast of All Saints and belongs to the Parish of Brestanica. It has Romanesque foundations and was mostly rebuilt in 1724.
