= Telče =

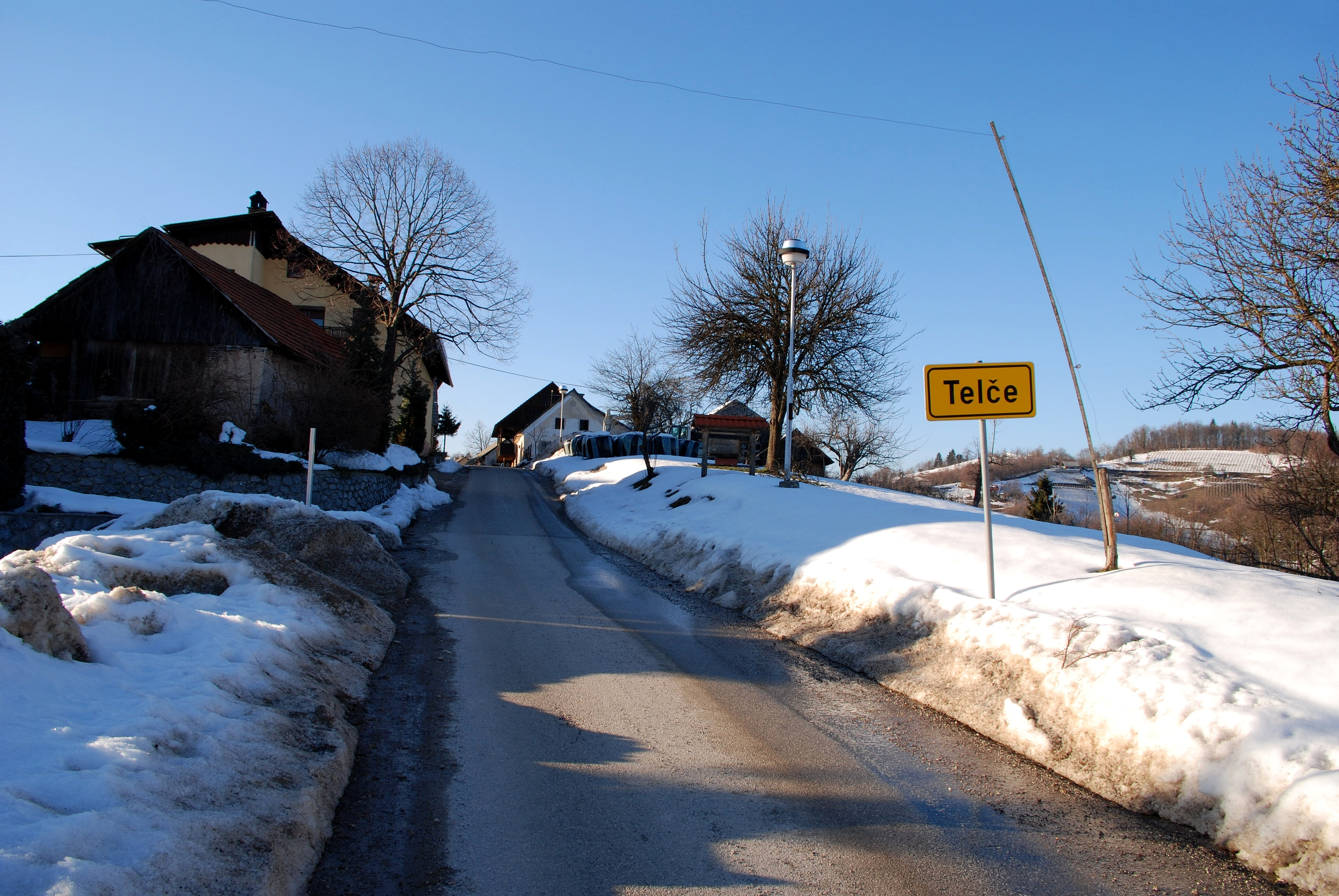
- Telče from the southeast

- Location in Slovenia
- Coordinates: 45°57′28.6″N 15°15′40.92″E
- Country: Slovenia
- Traditional region: Lower Carniola
- Statistical region: Lower Sava
- Municipality: Sevnica

Area
  - Total: 2.4 km^{2} (0.93 sq mi)
- Elevation: 488.9 m (1,604 ft)

Population (2012)
  - Total: 79
  - Density: 33/km^{2} (85/sq mi)

Telče (pronounced [ˈteːu̯tʃɛ]; German: Teltsche) is a settlement east of Tržišče in the Municipality of Sevnica in east-central Slovenia. The area is part of the historical region of Lower Carniola. The municipality is now included in the Lower Sava Statistical Region.

The local church, built in an isolated location northwest of the settlement core, is dedicated to Saint James (Slovene: sveti Jakob) and belongs to the Parish of Škocjan pri Novem Mestu. It dates to the 16th or 17th century.

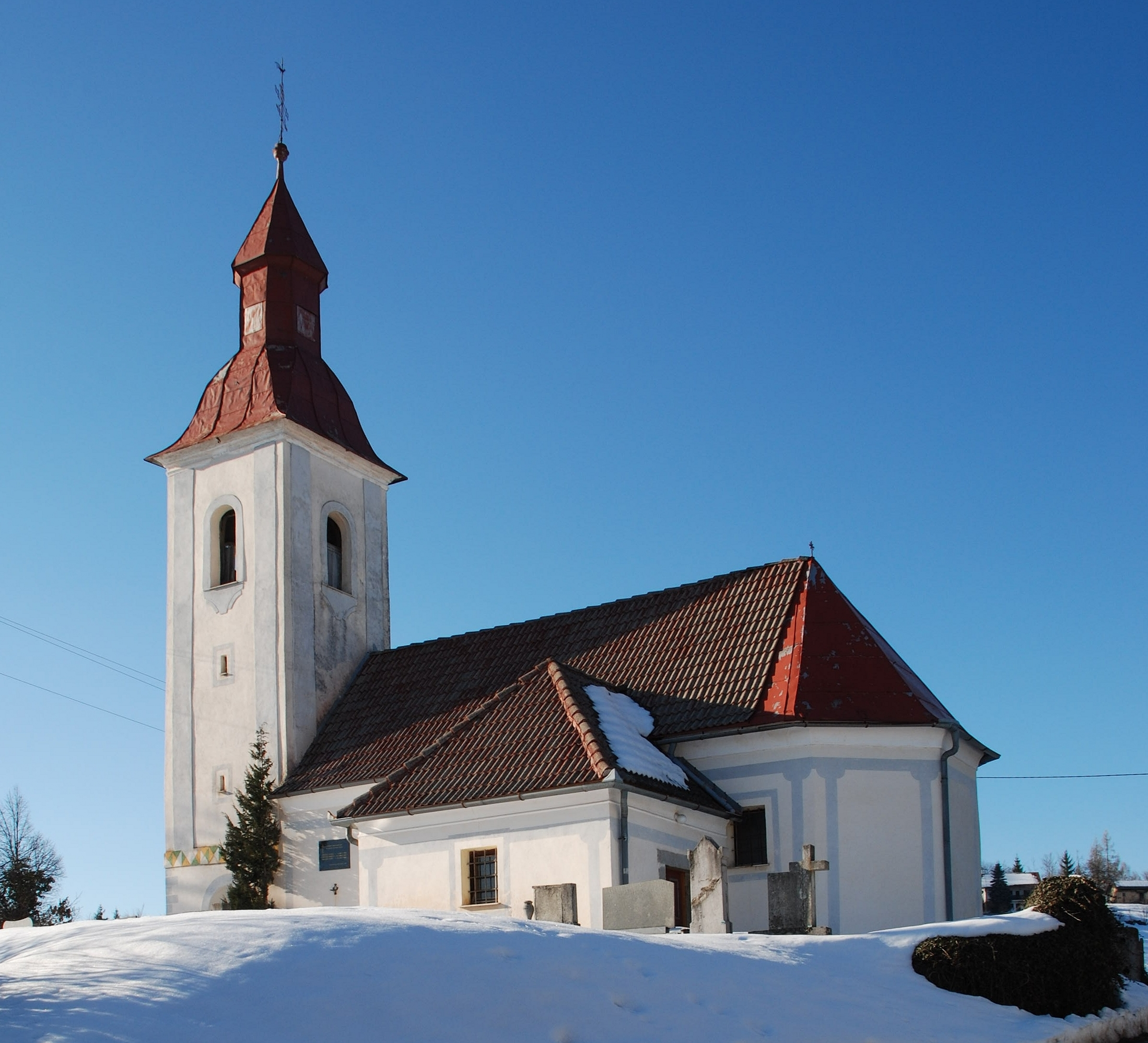
Saint James the Greater Church
