= Jelovec, Sevnica =

Jelovec
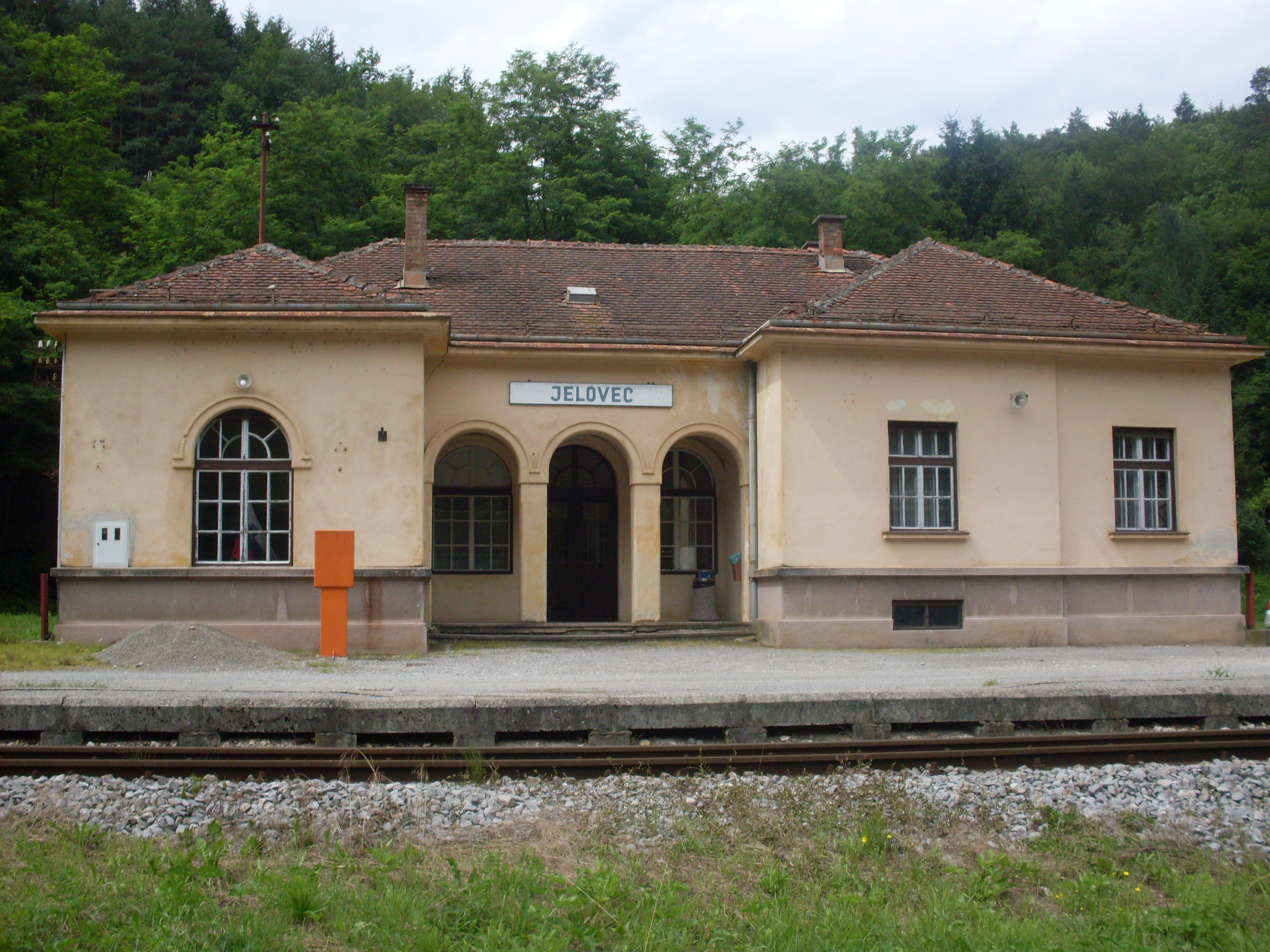
- Jelovec railway station

- Location in Slovenia
- Coordinates: 45°59′23.11″N 15°14′24.32″E
- Country: Slovenia
- Traditional region: Lower Carniola
- Statistical region: Lower Sava
- Municipality: Sevnica

Area
  - Total: 3.37 km^{2} (1.30 sq mi)
- Elevation: 48 m (157 ft)

Population (2002)
  - Total: 48

Jelovec (pronounced [jɛˈlɔːʋəts] or [jɛˈloːʋəts]); is a settlement on the left bank of the Mirna River in the Municipality of Sevnica in central Slovenia. The area is part of the historical region of Lower Carniola. The municipality is now included in the Lower Sava Statistical Region.

A bridge over the Mirna River in the settlement was built between 1936 and 1938.
