= Mrzla Planina =

- Location in Slovenia
- Coordinates: 46°3′20.28″N 15°23′41.8″E
- Country: Slovenia
- Traditional region: Styria
- Statistical region: Lower Sava
- Municipality: Sevnica

Area
  - Total: 6.69 km^{2} (2.58 sq mi)
- Elevation: 661.3 m (2,170 ft)

Population (2002)
  - Total: 127

Mrzla Planina (pronounced [ˈmə́ɾzla plaˈnìːna]) is a dispersed settlement in the hills northeast of Sevnica in east-central Slovenia. The area is part of the historical region of Styria. The municipality is now included in the Lower Sava Statistical Region.

The local church just north of the hamlet of Pokojni Vrh is dedicated to Saints Primus and Felician and belongs to the Parish of Zabukovje. It is probably of Romanesque origin, but was extensively rebuilt in the 17th century.
