= Spodnje Vodale =

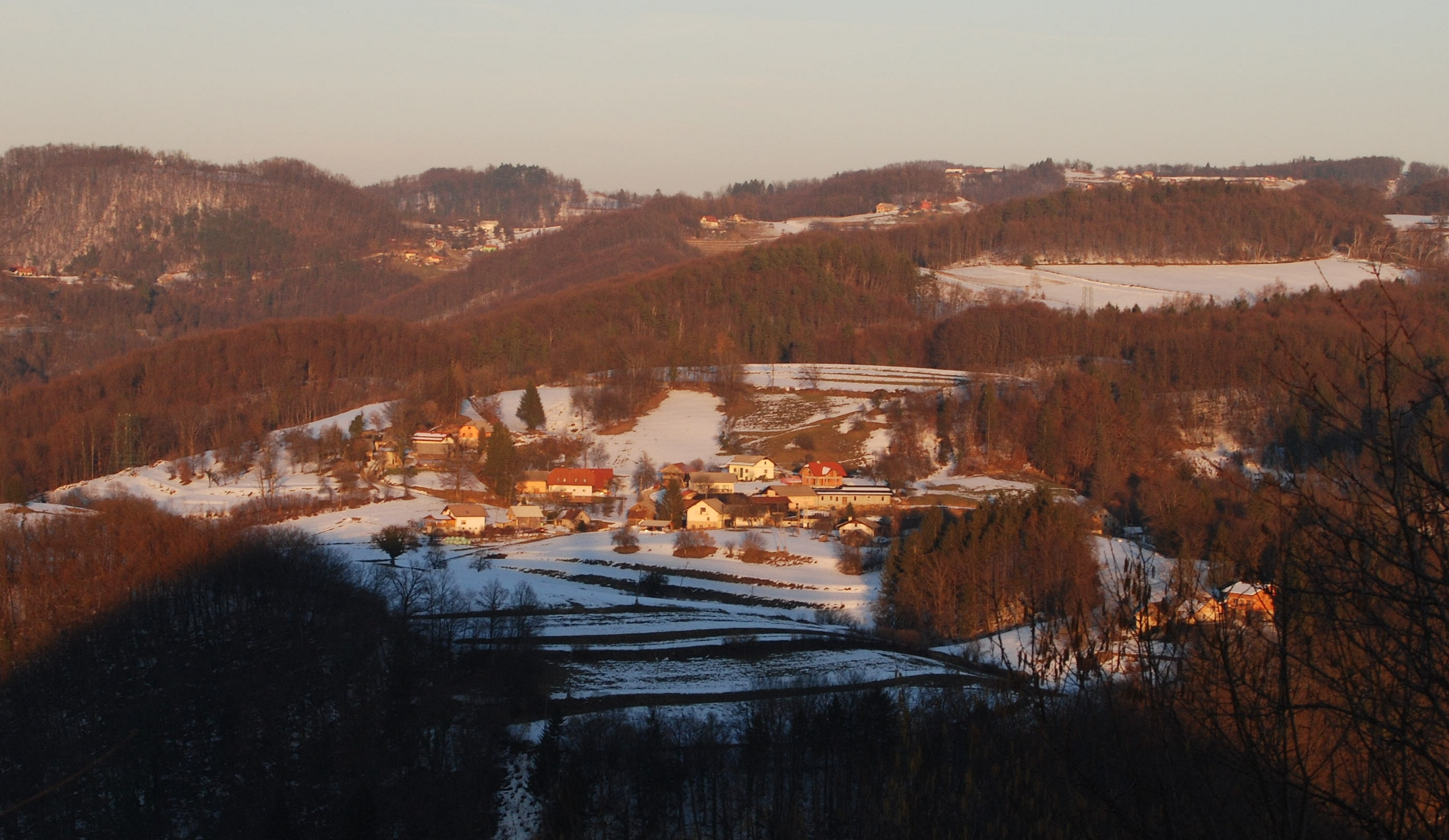
- Spodnje Vodale from the west

- Location in Slovenia
- Coordinates: 45°57′55.89″N 15°12′22.71″E
- Country: Slovenia
- Traditional region: Lower Carniola
- Statistical region: Lower Sava
- Municipality: Sevnica

Area
  - Total: 3.34 km^{2} (1.29 sq mi)
- Elevation: 292.7 m (960 ft)

Population (2002)
  - Total: 114

Spodnje Vodale (pronounced [ˈspoːdnjɛ ʋɔˈdaːlɛ]) is a settlement east of Tržišče in the Municipality of Sevnica in east-central Slovenia. The municipality is now included in the Lower Sava Statistical Region. The area is part of the traditional region of Lower Carniola.
