= Žigrski Vrh =

- Location in Slovenia
- Coordinates: 46°0′36.82″N 15°21′28.61″E
- Country: Slovenia
- Traditional region: Styria
- Statistical region: Lower Sava
- Municipality: Sevnica

Area
  - Total: 2.65 km^{2} (1.02 sq mi)
- Elevation: 305.1 m (1,001 ft)

Population (2002)
  - Total: 171

Žigrski Vrh (pronounced [ˈʒiːɡəɾski ˈʋəɾx], in older sources Žigarski Vrh, German: Siegersberg) is a settlement in the Municipality of Sevnica in central Slovenia. It lies in the hills above the left bank of the Sava River east of Sevnica in the historical region of Styria. The municipality is now included in the Lower Sava Statistical Region.

The local church is dedicated to Saint Benedict and belongs to the Parish of Sevnica. It dates to the 16th century and was remodelled around 1700 in the Baroque style.
