= Malkovec =

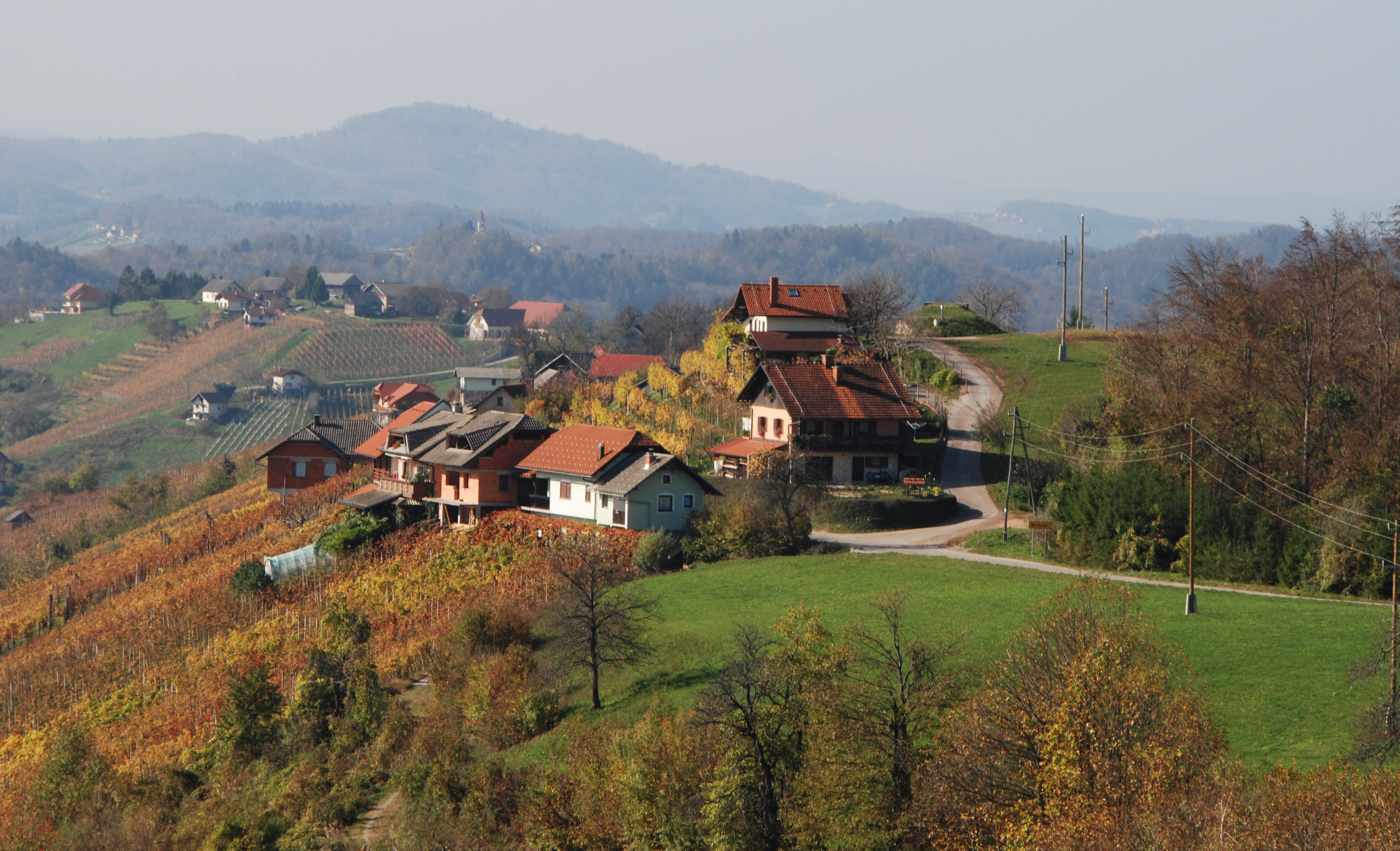
- View of Malkovec from the village of Slančji Vrh (from the east)

- Location in Slovenia
- Coordinates: 45°56′56.55″N 15°12′57.78″E
- Country: Slovenia
- Traditional region: Lower Carniola
- Statistical region: Lower Sava
- Municipality: Sevnica

Area
  - Total: 2.16 km^{2} (0.83 sq mi)
- Elevation: 420 m (1,380 ft)

Population (2002)
  - Total: 144

Malkovec (pronounced [ˈmaːlkɔʋəts]) is a viticultural settlement along the road on the ridge of Malkovec Hill, southeast of Tržišče, in the Municipality of Sevnica in the Sava region of Slovenia. The municipality is included in the Lower Sava Statistical Region. The area is part of the traditional region of Lower Carniola.
