= Čelovnik =

- Location in Slovenia
- Coordinates: 46°4′45.1″N 15°11′24.67″E
- Country: Slovenia
- Traditional region: Styria
- Statistical region: Lower Sava
- Municipality: Sevnica

Area
  - Total: 2.71 km^{2} (1.05 sq mi)
- Elevation: 518.3 m (1,700 ft)

Population (2002)
  - Total: 16

Čelovnik (pronounced [tʃɛlɔu̯ˈniːk]) is a dispersed settlement in the hills north of Loka pri Zidanem Mostu in the Municipality of Sevnica in central Slovenia. The area is part of the historical region of Styria. The municipality is now included in the Lower Sava Statistical Region.

The local church is dedicated to the Holy Spirit (Slovene: Sveti Duh) and belongs to the Parish of Loka pri Zidanem Mostu. It dates to the 14th century.
