= Gornje Impolje =

- Location in Slovenia
- Coordinates: 45°58′21.95″N 15°18′29.34″E
- Country: Slovenia
- Traditional region: Lower Carniola
- Statistical region: Lower Sava
- Municipality: Sevnica

Area
  - Total: 0.61 km^{2} (0.24 sq mi)
- Elevation: 433.2 m (1,421 ft)

Population (2002)
  - Total: 25

Gornje Impolje (pronounced [ˈɡoːɾnjɛ ˈimːpɔljɛ]; in older sources also Gorenje Impole, German: Oberimpelhof) is a small settlement in the Municipality of Sevnica in central Slovenia. It lies in the Sava Hills (Slovene: Posavsko hribovje) above the right bank of the Sava River in the historical region of Lower Carniola. The municipality is now included in the Lower Sava Statistical Region.
