= Orešje nad Sevnico =

- Location in Slovenia
- Coordinates: 46°3′0.61″N 15°17′53.22″E
- Country: Slovenia
- Traditional region: Styria
- Statistical region: Lower Sava
- Municipality: Sevnica

Area
  - Total: 2.18 km^{2} (0.84 sq mi)
- Elevation: 262.1 m (860 ft)

Population (2002)
  - Total: 173

Orešje nad Sevnico (pronounced [ɔˈɾeːʃjɛ nat ˈseːu̯nitsɔ]) is a settlement in the hills north of Sevnica in central Slovenia. The area is part of the traditional region of Styria. The municipality is now included in the Lower Sava Statistical Region.

== Name ==
The name of the settlement was changed from Orešje to Orešje nad Sevnico in 1953.
