= Brezovo, Sevnica =

Brezovo
- Location in Slovenia
- Coordinates: 45°56′50.9″N 15°20′32.35″E
- Country: Slovenia
- Traditional region: Styria
- Statistical region: Lower Sava
- Municipality: Sevnica

Area
  - Total: 1.49 km^{2} (0.58 sq mi)
- Elevation: 277.4 m (910 ft)

Population (2002)
  - Total: 37

Brezovo (pronounced [ˈbɾeːzɔʋɔ]) is a small settlement in the Sava Hills (Slovene: Posavsko hribovje) in the Municipality of Sevnica in central Slovenia. The area is part of the historical region of Styria. The municipality is now included in the Lower Sava Statistical Region.
