= Žurkov Dol =

- Location in Slovenia
- Coordinates: 46°1′27.31″N 15°19′55.47″E
- Country: Slovenia
- Traditional region: Styria
- Statistical region: Lower Sava
- Municipality: Sevnica

Area
  - Total: 2.58 km^{2} (1.00 sq mi)
- Elevation: 239.7 m (786 ft)

Population (2002)
  - Total: 193

Žurkov Dol (pronounced [ˈʒuːɾkɔu̯ ˈdoːl]) is a settlement in the hills above Sevnica in central Slovenia. The area is part of the historical region of Styria. The Municipality of Sevnica is now included in the Lower Sava Statistical Region.
