= Koludrje =

- Location in Slovenia
- Coordinates: 46°0′11.2″N 15°9′59.59″E
- Country: Slovenia
- Traditional region: Lower Carniola
- Statistical region: Lower Sava
- Municipality: Sevnica

Area
  - Total: 0.49 km^{2} (0.19 sq mi)
- Elevation: 326.5 m (1,071 ft)

Population (2012)
  - Total: ▲50
  - Density: 101/km^{2} (260/sq mi)

Koludrje (pronounced [kɔˈluːdəɾjɛ]; in older sources also Koluderje) is a small settlement south of Šentjanž in the Municipality of Sevnica in central Slovenia. The area is part of the historical region of Lower Carniola and is now included in the Lower Sava Statistical Region.
