= Zgornje Vodale =

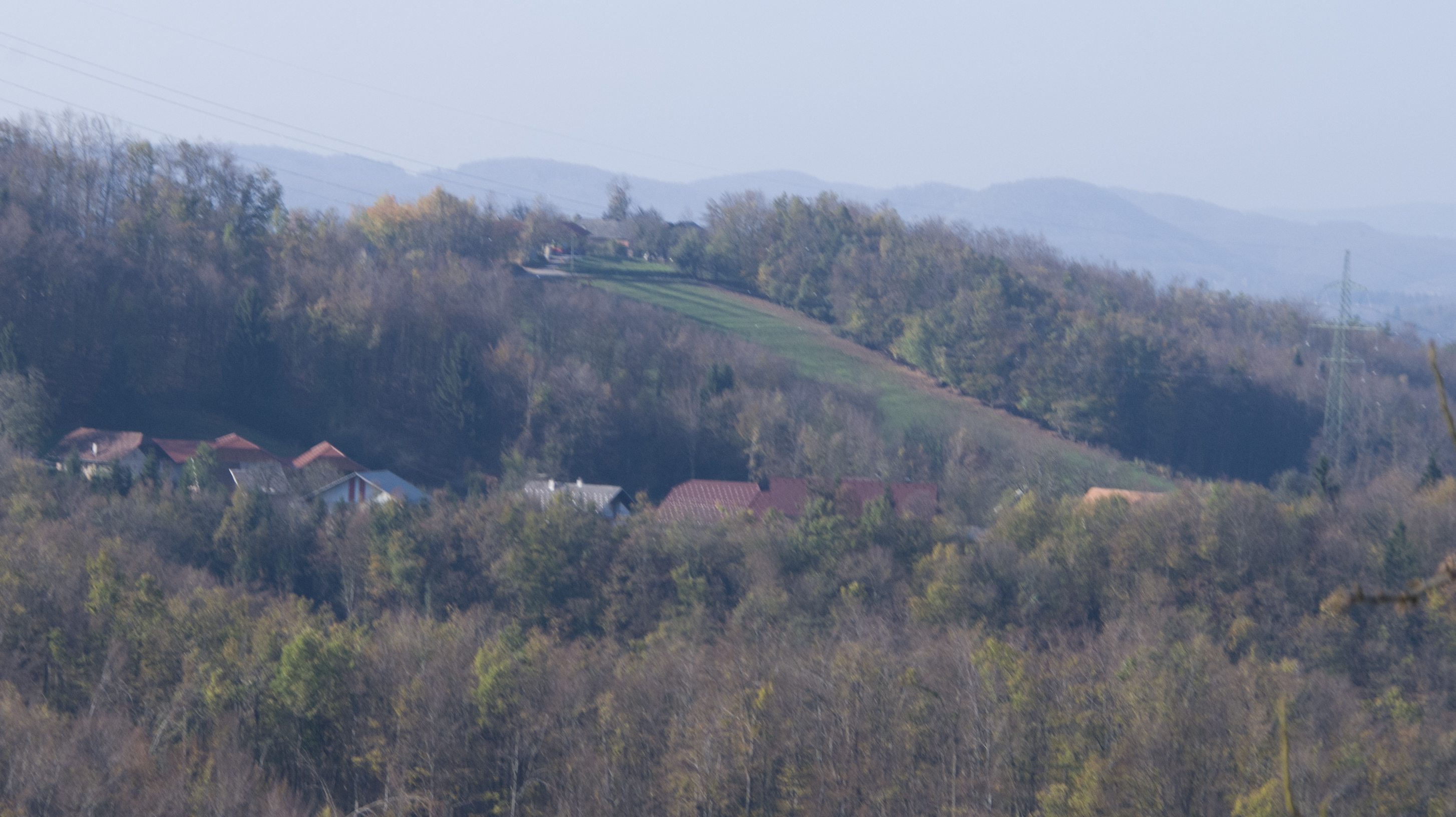

- Location in Slovenia
- Coordinates: 45°57′35.57″N 15°14′22.46″E
- Country: Slovenia
- Traditional region: Lower Carniola
- Statistical region: Lower Sava
- Municipality: Sevnica

Area
  - Total: 1.49 km^{2} (0.58 sq mi)
- Elevation: 494.7 m (1,623 ft)

Population (2002)
  - Total: 37

Zgornje Vodale (pronounced [ˈzɡoːɾnjɛ ʋɔˈdaːlɛ] or [ˈzɡoːɾnjɛ ˈʋoːdalɛ]) is a small settlement in the hills east of Tržišče in the Municipality of Sevnica in central Slovenia. The area is part of the traditional region of Lower Carniola and is included in the Lower Sava Statistical Region.
