= Križišče =

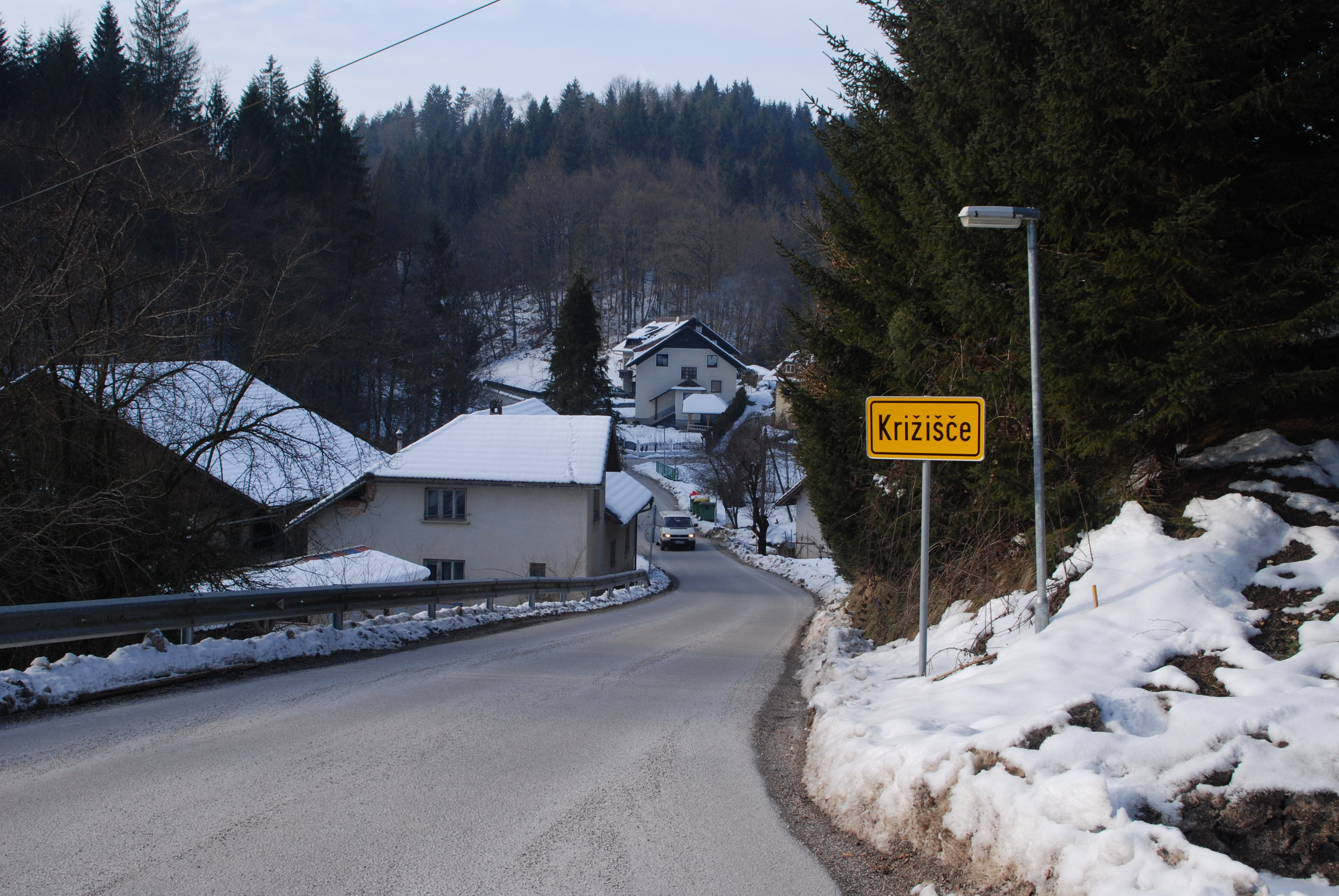

- Location in Slovenia
- Coordinates: 45°59′25.03″N 15°11′49.58″E
- Country: Slovenia
- Traditional region: Lower Carniola
- Statistical region: Lower Sava
- Municipality: Sevnica

Area
  - Total: 0.7 km^{2} (0.27 sq mi)
- Elevation: 247 m (810 ft)

Population (2012)
  - Total: 37
  - Density: 56/km^{2} (150/sq mi)
- Postal code: 8296

Križišče (pronounced [kɾiˈʒiːʃtʃɛ]) is a small village in the Municipality of Sevnica in southeastern Slovenia. It lies in the valley of Kamenica Creek (Slovene: Kamenški potok), northwest of the road linking Sevnica and Mokronog and east of the road linking Krmelj and Šentjanž. The village became an autonomous settlement in 2008, and was formed from parts of the settlements of Gabrje and Goveji Dol. It is part of the traditional region of Lower Carniola and is included in the Lower Sava Statistical Region. One of the two roads from Krmelj to the main road linking Mokronog and Sevnica runs through the settlement. The rail line from Sevnica to Trebnje runs past the southeastern border of the settlement.
