= Hinjce =

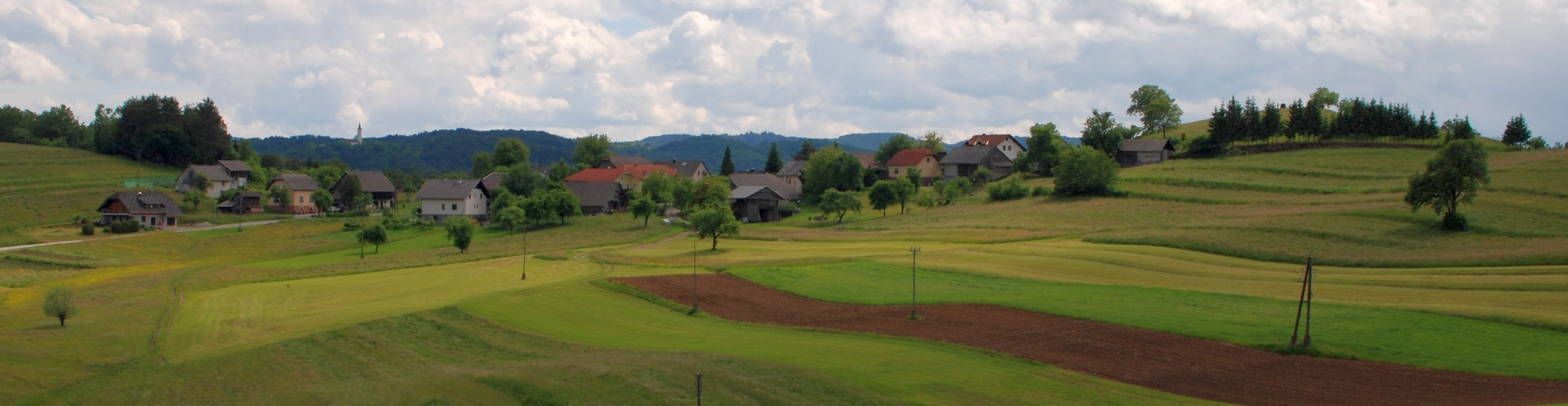
- View of Hinjce from Brezje

- Location in Slovenia
- Coordinates: 45°59′25.03″N 15°11′49.58″E
- Country: Slovenia
- Traditional region: Lower Carniola
- Statistical region: Lower Sava Slovenia
- Municipality: Sevnica

Area
  - Total: 0.25 km^{2} (0.097 sq mi)

Population (2013)
  - Total: 32
  - Density: 59/km^{2} (150/sq mi)
- Postal code: 8296

Hinjce (pronounced [ˈxiːntsɛ]) is a small village in the Municipality of Sevnica in southeastern Slovenia. It lies on a small rise east of Krmelj and west of the Mirna River and the village of Brezje. Until 2006, the area was part of the settlement of Goveji Dol. The village is part of the traditional region of Lower Carniola and is included in the Lower Sava Statistical Region. One of the two roads from Krmelj to the main road linking Mokronog and Sevnica runs through the settlement.

== Landmarks ==
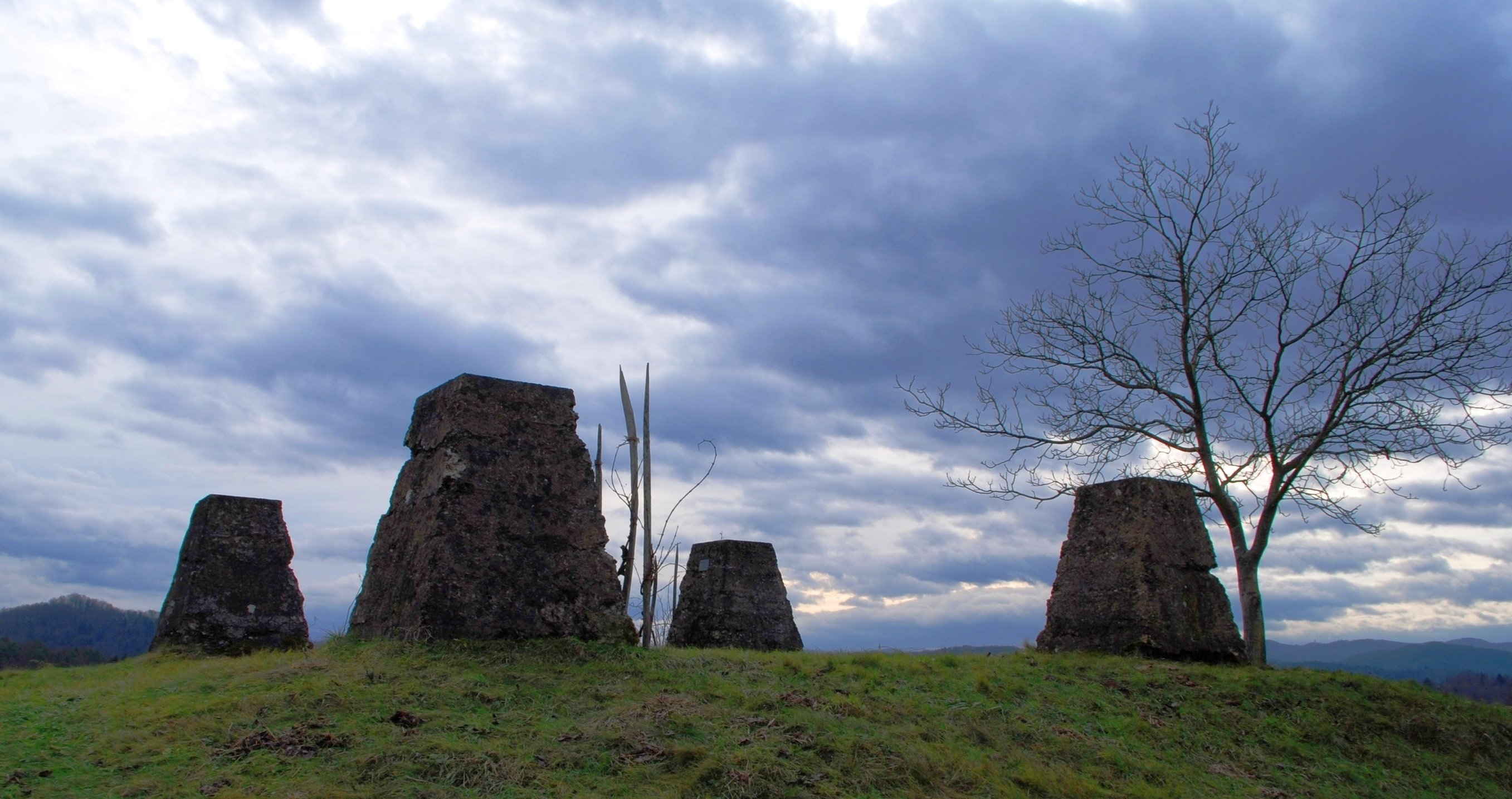
Foundations of German observation post no. 4

The foundations of a German border observation post from the Second World War, when the occupation border between the Third Reich and the Kingdom of Italy ran through Hinjce, stand north of the village core. In the village next to the main road, there is a monument dedicated to members of a village guard that were killed on 22 October 1943 by the German army. Part of it is a wooden sculpture made by Brane Šustar in 1978.
