= Pijavice =

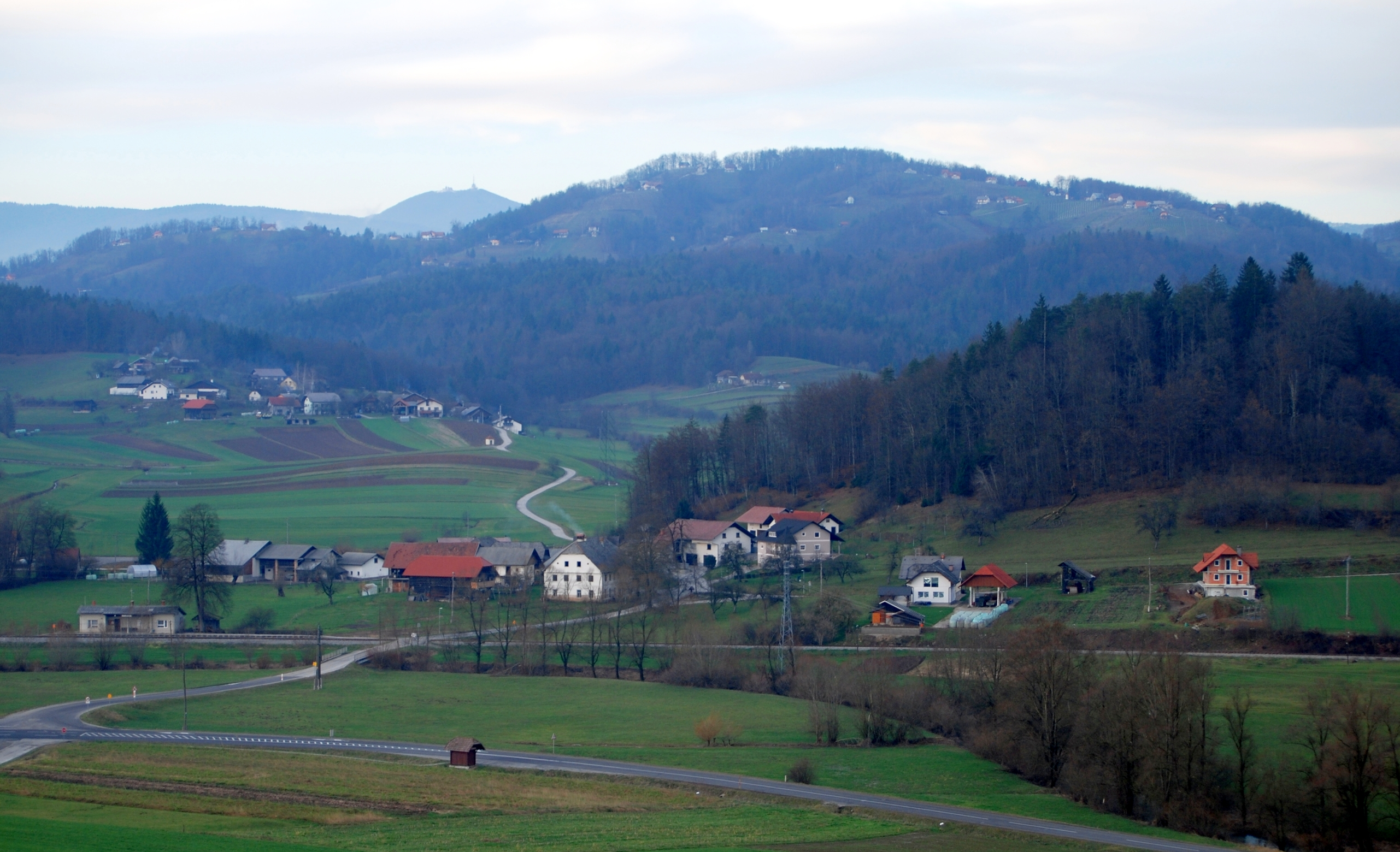
- View of Pijavice from Skrovnik (south)

- Location in Slovenia
- Coordinates: 45°58′11.69″N 15°9′46.68″E
- Country: Slovenia
- Traditional region: Lower Carniola
- Statistical region: Lower Sava
- Municipality: Sevnica

Area
  - Total: 0.56 km^{2} (0.22 sq mi)
- Elevation: 229.4 m (753 ft)

Population (2002)
  - Total: 64

Pijavice (pronounced [piˈjaːʋitsɛ]; German: Piauze) is a small settlement in the Mirna Valley in southeastern Slovenia. The village lies southwest of Krmelj along the railway from Sevnica to Trebnje and the left bank of the Mirna River. Traditionally, it is part of Lower Carniola. Administratively, it is part of the Municipality of Sevnica. The municipality is included in the Lower Sava Statistical Region. The rail line from Sevnica to Trebnje runs through the settlement and has a station there.
