= Goveji Dol =

- Location in Slovenia
- Coordinates: 45°58′56.51″N 15°11′59.7″E
- Country: Slovenia
- Traditional region: Lower Carniola
- Statistical region: Lower Sava
- Municipality: Sevnica

Area
  - Total: 0.87 km^{2} (0.34 sq mi)
- Elevation: 327.9 m (1,076 ft)

Population (2012)
  - Total: 19
  - Density: 22/km^{2} (57/sq mi)

Goveji Dol (pronounced [ɡɔˈʋɛːji ˈdoːl]; German: Gowidul) is a small settlement east of Krmelj in the Municipality of Sevnica in central Slovenia. The area is part of the historical region of Lower Carniola. The municipality is now included in the Lower Sava Statistical Region. In 2004, Hinjce, until then a part of Goveji Dol, became an independent settlement. In 2006, Brezje, until then a hamlet of Goveji Dol, became an autonomous settlement. In 2008, a part of Goveji Dol and a part of Gabrje merged into a new settlement named Križišče.
