= Boštanj =

Boštanj may refer to:

- Boštanj, Sevnica, a village in Slovenia
- Boštanj, Grosuplje, a former village in Slovenia
- Dolenji Boštanj, a village near Sevnica, Slovenia
