= Stop sign =

Traffic sign instructing drivers to stop

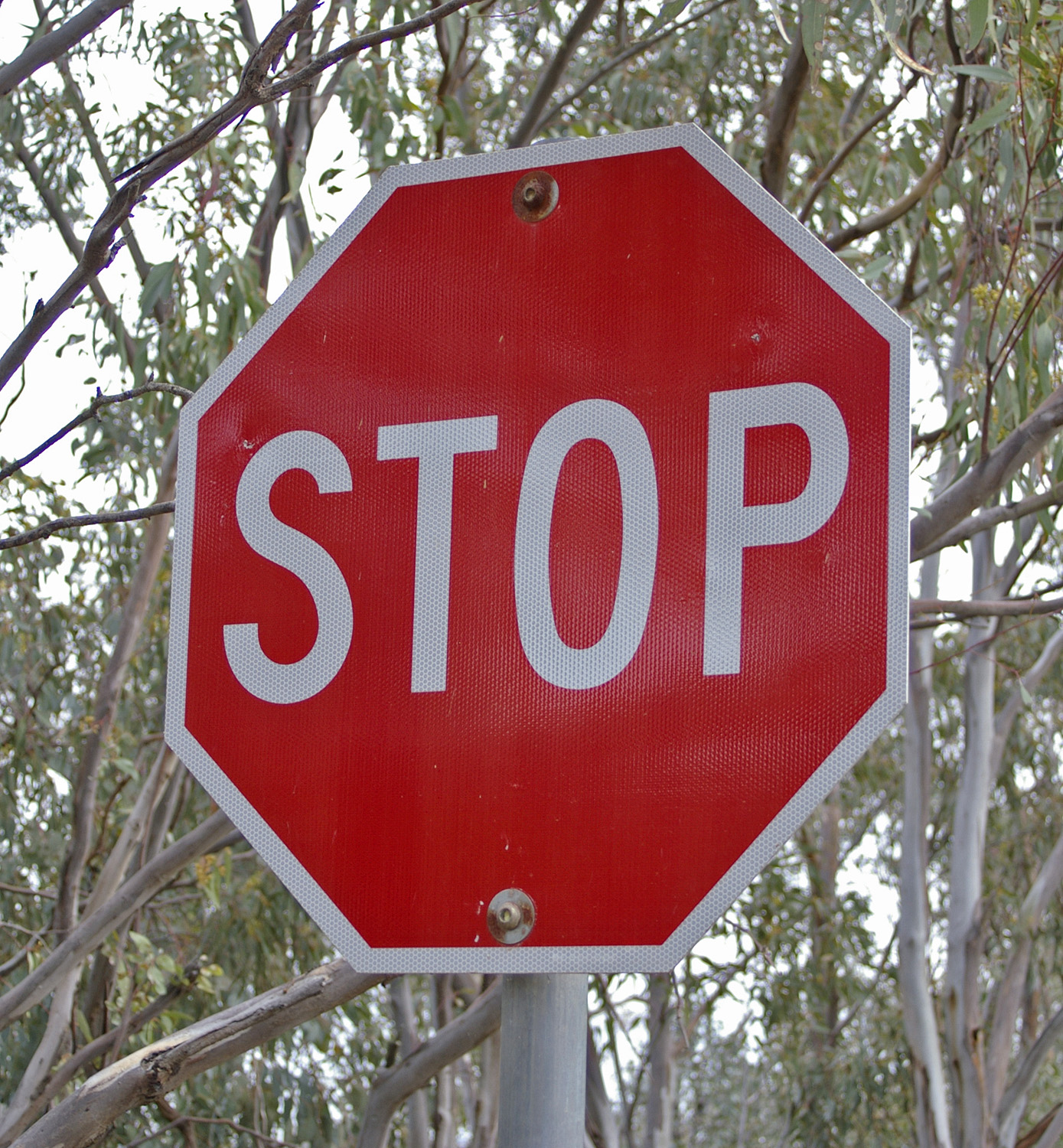
A stop sign in Australia. This style, a red octagon with the word "Stop" in either English or the national language of that particular region, is used by the greatest number of countries.

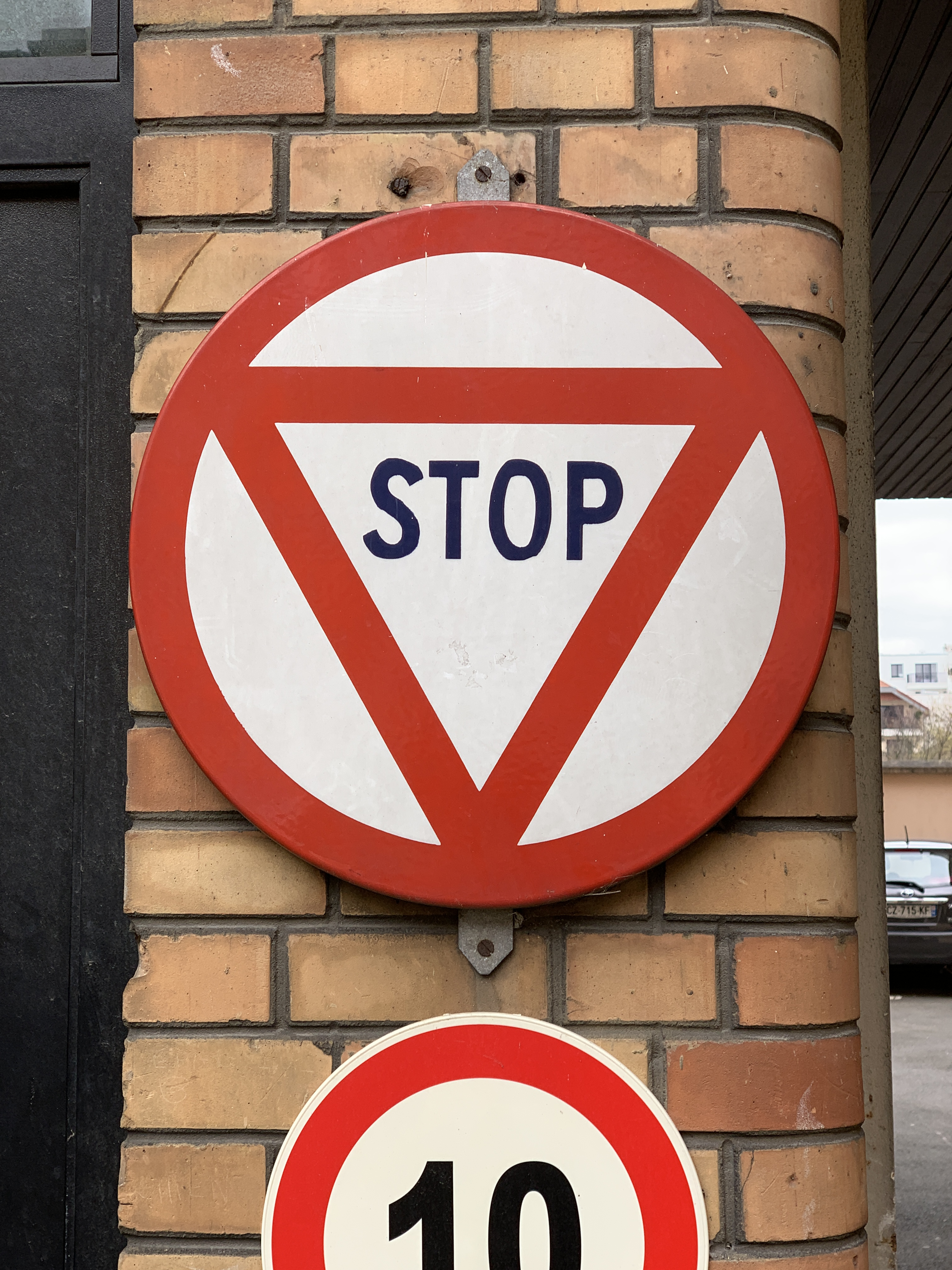
A circular stop sign in France. The Vienna Convention on Road Signs and Signals allowed this older style until 2026.

A stop sign is a traffic sign designed to notify drivers that they must come to a complete stop and make sure the intersection (or railroad crossing) is safely clear of vehicles and pedestrians before continuing past the sign. In many countries, the sign is a red octagon with the word STOP, in either English, the national language of that particular country, or both, displayed in white or yellow. The Vienna Convention on Road Signs and Signals previously allowed an alternative version: a red circle with a red inverted triangle with either a white or yellow background, and a black or dark blue STOP. Some countries may also use other types, such as Japan's inverted red triangle stop sign. Particular regulations regarding appearance, installation, and compliance with the signs vary by some jurisdictions.

== Design and configuration ==
The 1968 Vienna Convention on Road Signs and Signals previously allowed for two types of stop signs as well as several acceptable variants. Sign B2a is a red octagon with a white stop legend. The European Annex to the convention also allows the background to be "light yellow". Sign B2b, which was discontinued after the 2025 amendment, was a red circle with a red inverted triangle with either a white or yellow background, and a black or dark blue stop legend. The Convention allows for the word "STOP" to be in either English or the national language of the particular country. The finalized version by the United Nations Economic and Social Council's Conference on Road Traffic in 1968 (and in force in 1978) proposed standard stop sign diameters of 600, 900 or 1200 mm (24, 36 or 48 inches).

The United Kingdom and New Zealand stop signs are 750, 900 or 1200 mm (about 30, 36 or 48 inches), according to sign location and traffic speeds.

In the United States, stop signs are 30 inches (76 cm) across opposite flats of the red octagon, with a 3/4-inch (1.9 cm) white border. The white uppercase stop legend is 10 inches (25 cm) tall. Larger signs of 35 inches (89 cm) with 12-inch (30 cm) legend and 1-inch (2.5 cm) border are used on multi-lane expressways. Regulatory provisions exist for extra-large 45-inch (110 cm) signs with 16-inch (41 cm) legend and 1 3/4-inch (4.4 cm) border for use where sign visibility or reaction distance are limited, and the smallest permissible stop sign size for general usage is 24 inches (61 cm) with an 8-inch (20 cm) legend and 5/8-inch (1.6 cm) border. The metric units specified in the US regulatory manuals are rounded approximations of US customary units, not exact conversions. The field, legend, and border are all retroreflective.

Some modern stop signs have flashing LEDs around the perimeter, which has been shown to substantially reduce crashes.

B2a

Acceptable variant of B2a in the European Annex

B2b (until 2026)

Acceptable variant of B2b

Acceptable variant of B2b

Acceptable variant of B2b

== History ==
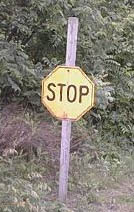
Yellow U.S. 1927–1954 stop sign

The first stop sign was created in 1914 by Detroit police sergeant Harold "Harry" Jackson, who was working as a traffic guard at a busy city intersection. One of the cross streets had a particularly low-visibility turn entering the intersection, almost always forcing Sgt. Jackson to slow down and hold back the traffic entering from that street. Looking for ways to make his job easier, he took a rectangular piece of plywood, cut the corners off of it to give it a distinct shape, wrote "STOP" over the center, and placed it facing the street. He noticed that his innovation improved the overall traffic flow through the intersection. After he shared his experience with fellow officers at a meeting, the practice started to spread across the city intersections. The next year, 1915, stop signs were adopted across Michigan. The first signs had black lettering on a white background and were 24 by 24 inches (61 cm × 61 cm), somewhat smaller than the current sign.

As stop signs became more widespread, a rural-dominated committee supported by the American Association of State Highway Officials (AASHO) met in 1922 to standardize them and selected the octagonal shape that has been used in the United States ever since. The unique eight-sided shape of the sign allows drivers facing the back of the sign to identify that oncoming drivers have a stop sign and prevent confusion with other traffic signs. Another consideration of the AASHO was visibility and driver literacy, as summarized in subsequent State Highway Commission reports in the states of the U.S., was that the goal for signs "standardized throughout the Union" was that "The shape of the sign will indicate what it will mean. This has been worked up very carefully by the best-qualified men in the country and men who have made a thorough study of this question. It has been found that so many people have trouble in reading the sign that the shape of the sign is very much more important than the reading matter on it."

The octagon was also chosen so that it could be identified easily at night since the original signs were not reflective. The more urban-oriented National Conference on Street and Highway Safety (NCSHS) advocated a smaller red-on-yellow stop sign. These two organizations eventually merged to form the Joint Committee on Uniform Traffic Control Devices, which in 1935 published the first Manual on Uniform Traffic Control Devices for Streets and Highways (MUTCD) detailing the stop sign's specifications.

The MUTCD's stop sign specifications were altered eight times between 1935 and 1971. From 1924 to 1954, stop signs bore a red or black stop legend on a yellow field. Yellow was chosen because fade-resistant red materials were not available. Retro-reflective or self-lit signs were permitted in the 1935 MUTCD; retro-reflective ones were first required by the 1948 edition of the MUTCD, which also called for a 2 1/2-foot (0.76-metre) height from the road crown to the bottom of the stop sign. The 1954 MUTCD newly specified a white stop legend on a red field, and increased the mount height specification to 5 feet in rural areas. Red traffic lights signify stop, so the new specification unified red as a stop signal whether given by a sign or a light. The current mounting height of 7 ft (2.13 m) was first specified in 1971.

=== US mandate, international adoption ===
The MUTCD stop sign was already widely deployed in the United States when the use of other types of stop signs was eliminated in 1966. In 1968, this sign was adopted by the Vienna Convention on Road Signs and Signals as part of United Nations Economic Commission for Europe's effort to standardize road travel across borders. The Convention specifies that stop be written either in English or the national language, and also allows a circular sign with red legend. Forty European countries are party to the convention.

== Stop signs around the world ==
World map of countries' current and historical stop sign shapes: Octagonal Historically circular, now octagonal Triangular Historically triangular, now octagonal Circular Unknown

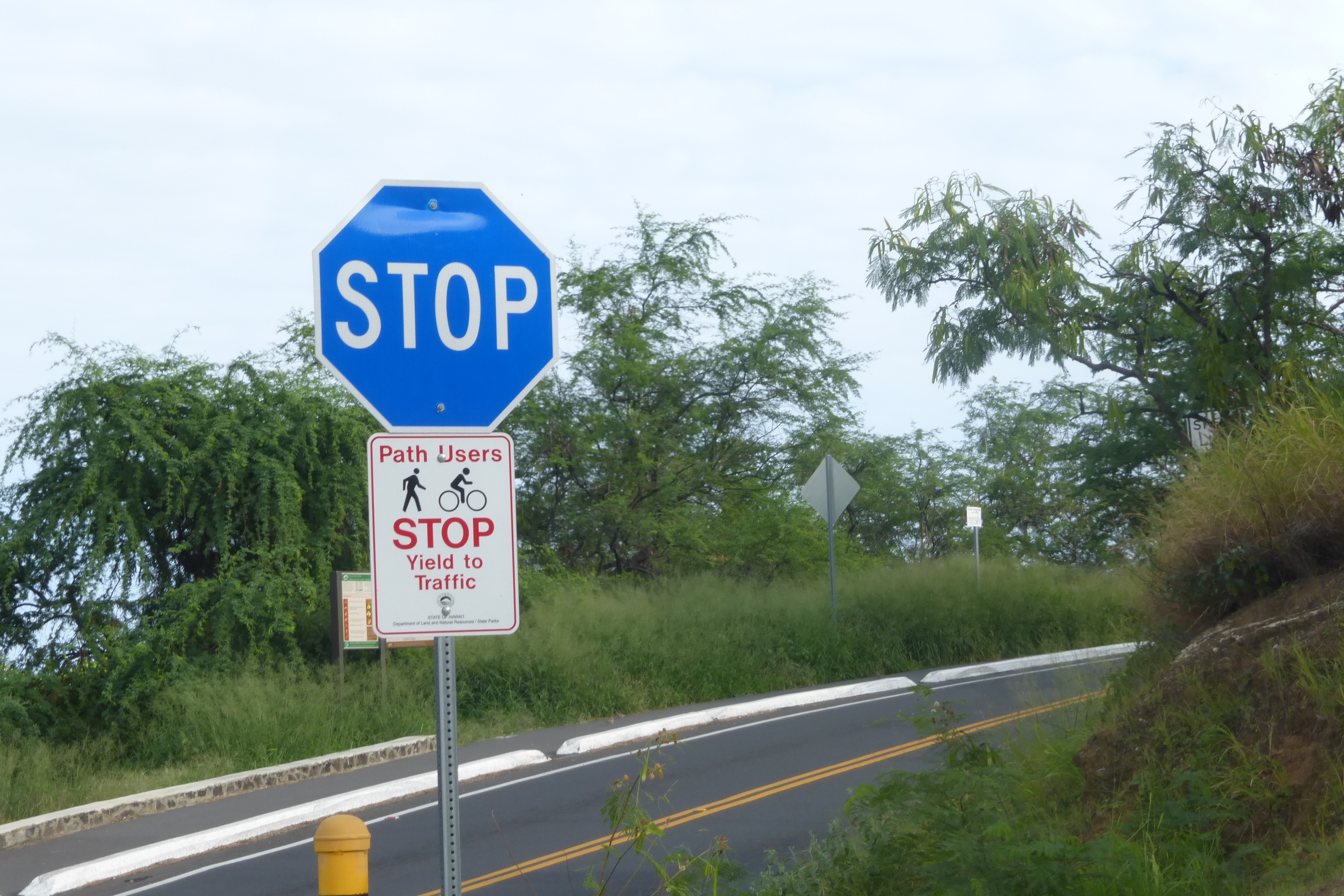
Blue and green stop signs are sometimes used on private property in Hawaii.

The red octagonal field with white English-language stop legend is the most common stop sign used around the world, but it is not universal; Japan uses an inverted solid red triangle, for example, and both Zambia and Zimbabwe until 2016 used a disc bearing a black cross. Moreover, there are many variants of the red-and-white octagonal sign. Although all English-speaking and many other countries use the word stop on stop signs, some jurisdictions use an equivalent word in their primary language instead, or in addition. Also, several languages borrowed the English word "stop" a long time ago, such as French, and therefore do not consider it to be a foreign word any more. The use of native languages is common on U.S. native reservations, especially those promoting language revitalization efforts, for example, and Israel uses no word, but rather a pictogram of a hand in a palm-forward "stop" gesture.

=== Asia ===
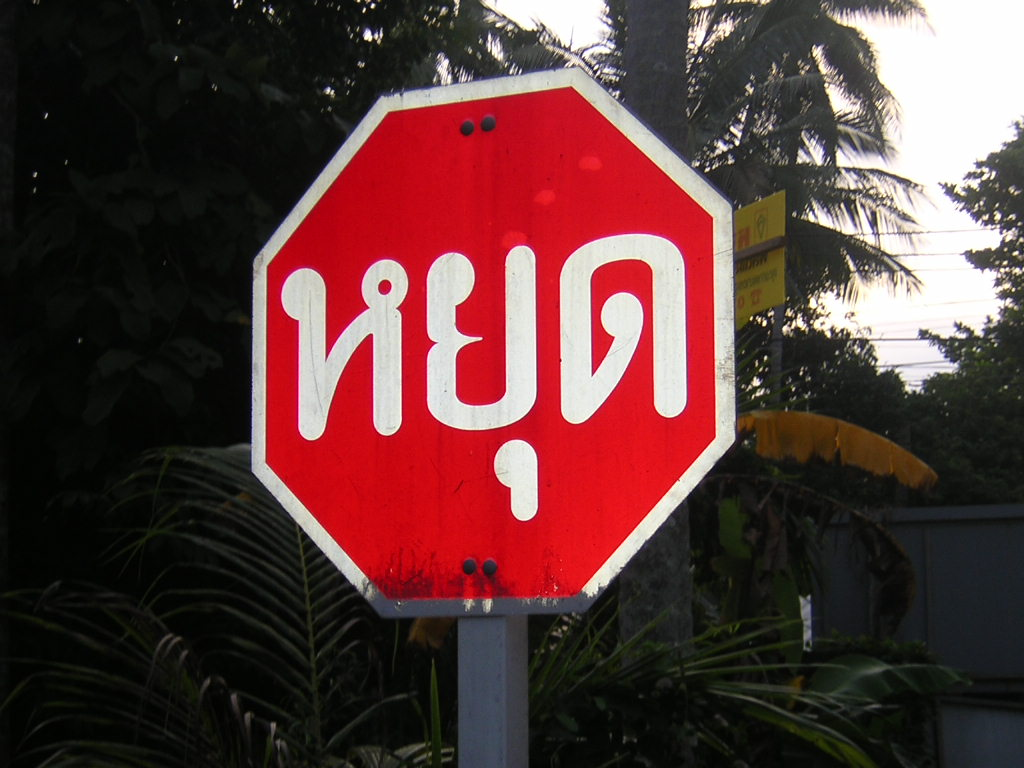
A stop sign in Thailand.

Countries in Asia generally use a native word, often in a non-Latin script. The sign's shape varies by location, with places such as South Korea, Hong Kong, or Taiwan using the standard octagon shape, with Japan using a triangle.

=== Canada ===
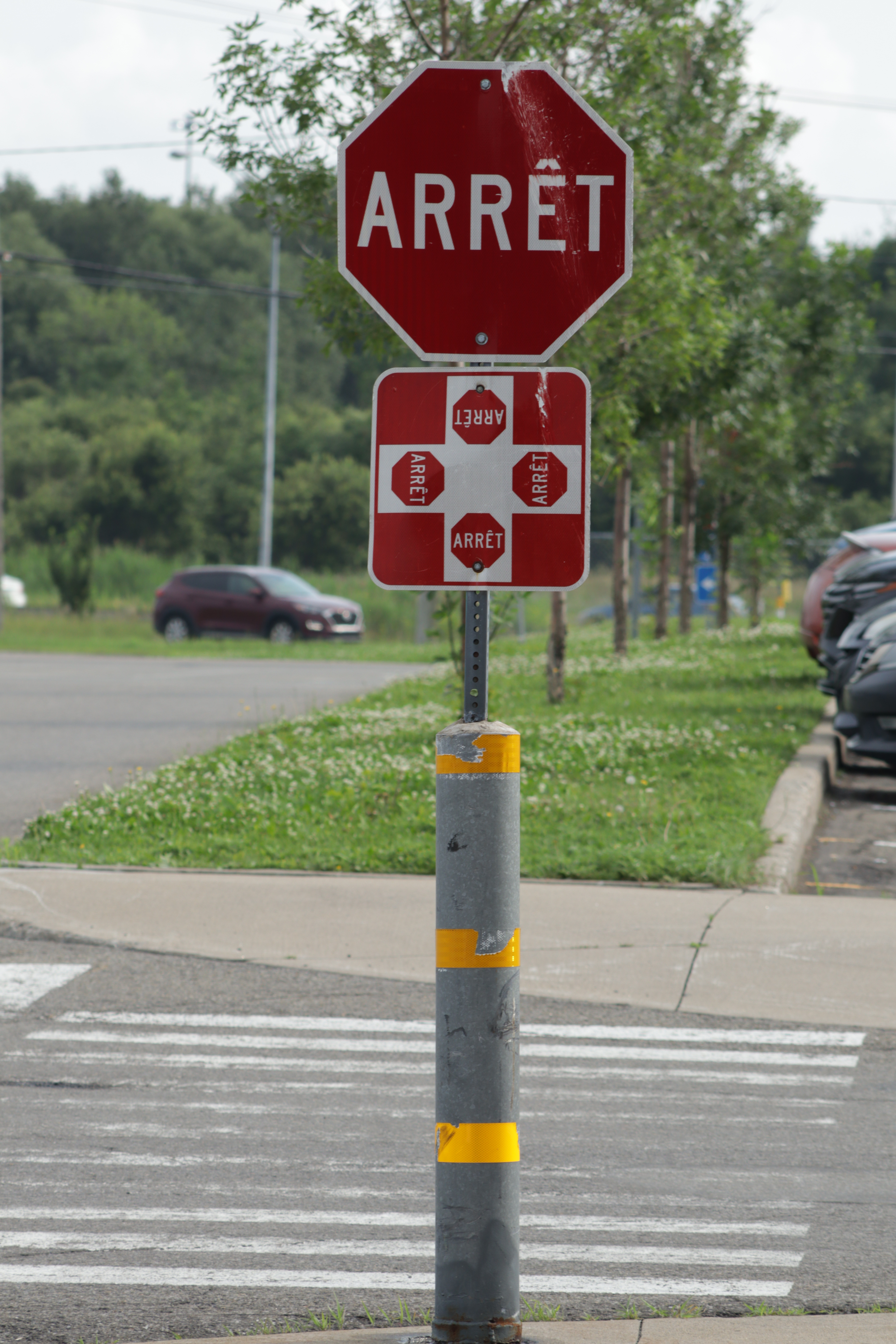
French stop sign in Quebec City, Quebec, along with a diagram underneath showing who else needs to stop.

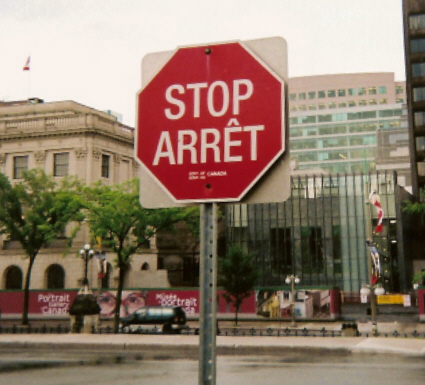
Bilingual stop sign in Ottawa, Ontario, Canada

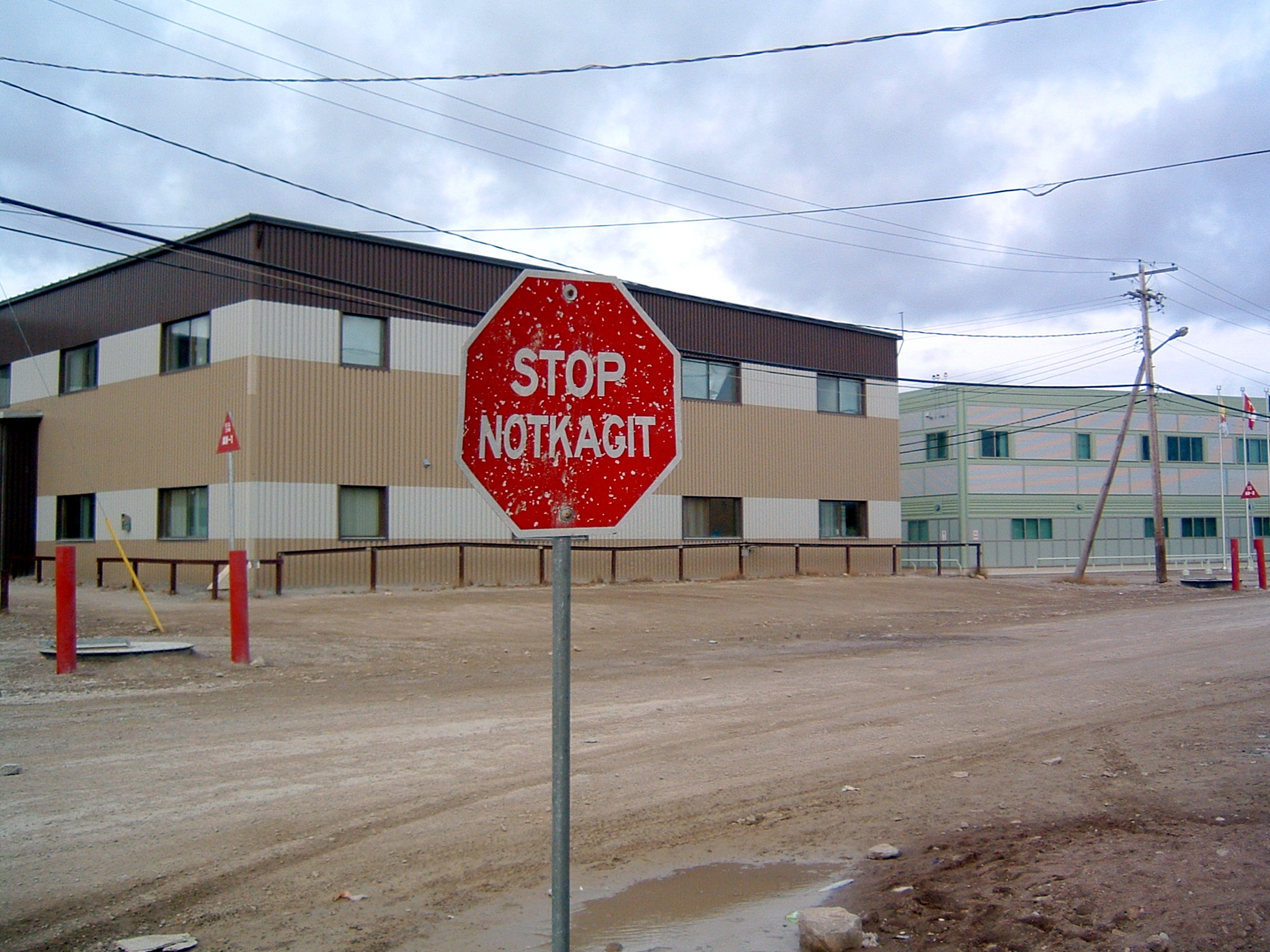
Bilingual sign (English and Inuktitut) in Nunavut

In the Canadian province of Quebec, modern signs read either arrêt or stop. As of 1987, Quebec removed the English stop from its road signs in favor of arrêt. Both stop and arrêt are considered valid French words, with France actually using the word "STOP" on its stop signs, and the Office québécois de la langue française (OQLF) notes that the use of "stop" on stop signs is attested in French since 1927. At the time of the debates surrounding the adoption of the Charter of the French Language ("Bill 101") in 1977, the usage of "stop" was considered to be English and therefore controversial; some signs were occasionally vandalized with red spray paint to turn the word stop into "101". However, it was later officially determined by the OQLF that "stop" is a valid French word in this context, and the older dual arrêt / stop usage is therefore considered redundant and therefore deprecated (à éviter). Newly installed signs thus use only one word, more commonly only arrêt in Québec, while stop is seen in predominantly English-speaking areas. The latter version of stop signs has been disagreed upon by some Quebec residents. Bilingual signs with stop arrêt are still placed in areas of Alberta, New Brunswick and Manitoba; the Acadian regions of Nova Scotia, and Prince Edward Island; on federal property in the National Capital Region; and at all border crossings of the Canada–United States border. On First Nations or Inuit territories, stop signs sometimes use the local aboriginal language in addition or instead of English, French, or both, such as Inuktitut notkagit. All other English-speaking areas of Canada use stop.

=== Europe ===
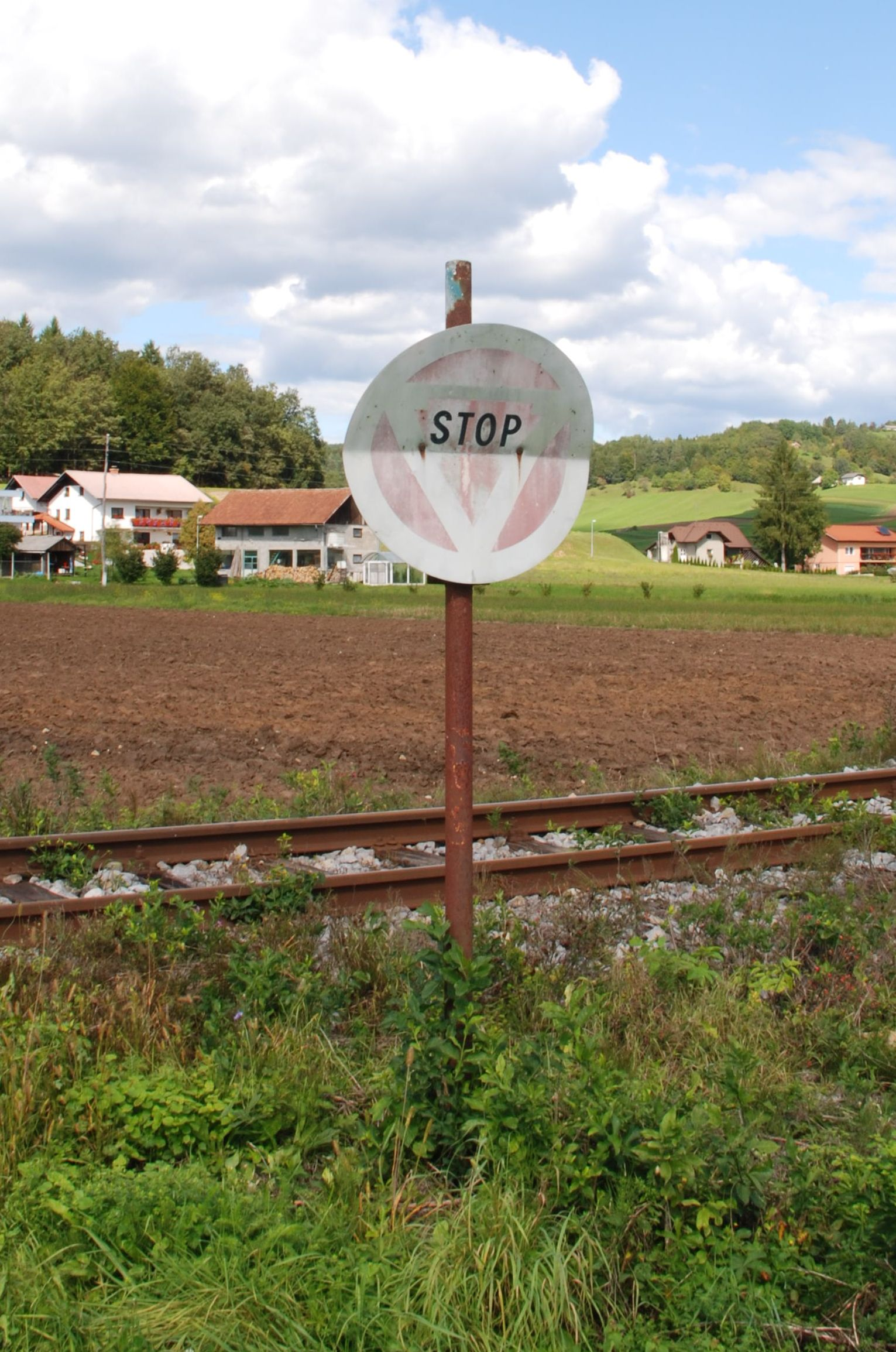
Old stop sign in Pijavice, Municipality of Sevnica, Slovenia.

Countries in Europe generally have stop signs with the text stop, regardless of local language. There were some objections to this when introduced around the 1970s, but now this is accepted. Turkey is a notable exception to this, instead using the Turkish word for stop: "dur".

=== Latin America ===
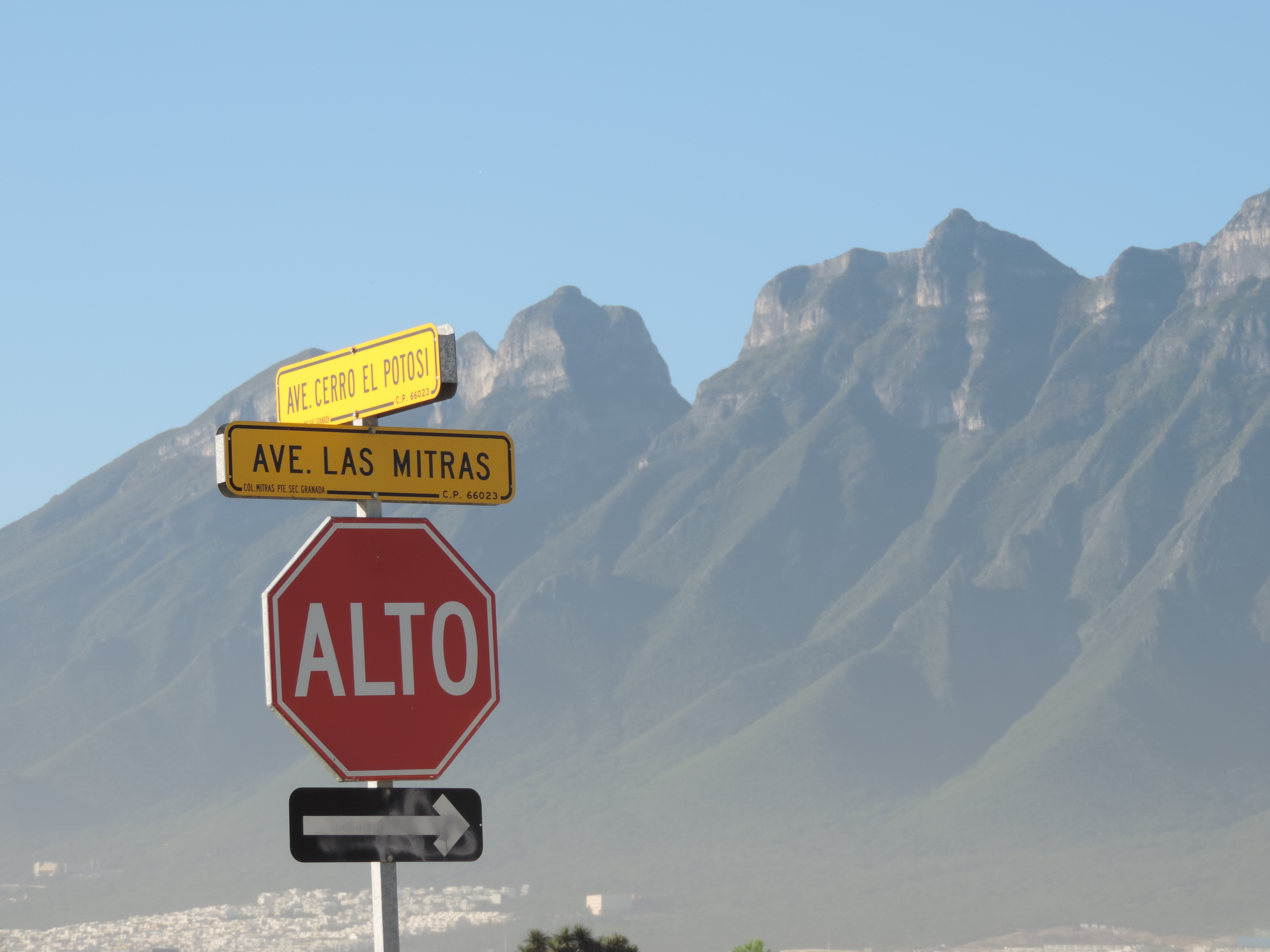
Stop sign in Monterrey, Mexico.

In Spanish and Portuguese-speaking Caribbean and South American countries (Argentina, Bolivia, Brazil, Chile, Colombia, Cuba, Dominican Republic, Ecuador, Paraguay, Peru, Puerto Rico, Uruguay, and Venezuela), signs bear the legend pare ("stop" in Portuguese and Spanish). Mexico and Central American countries bear the legend alto ("halt") instead.

=== Other countries ===
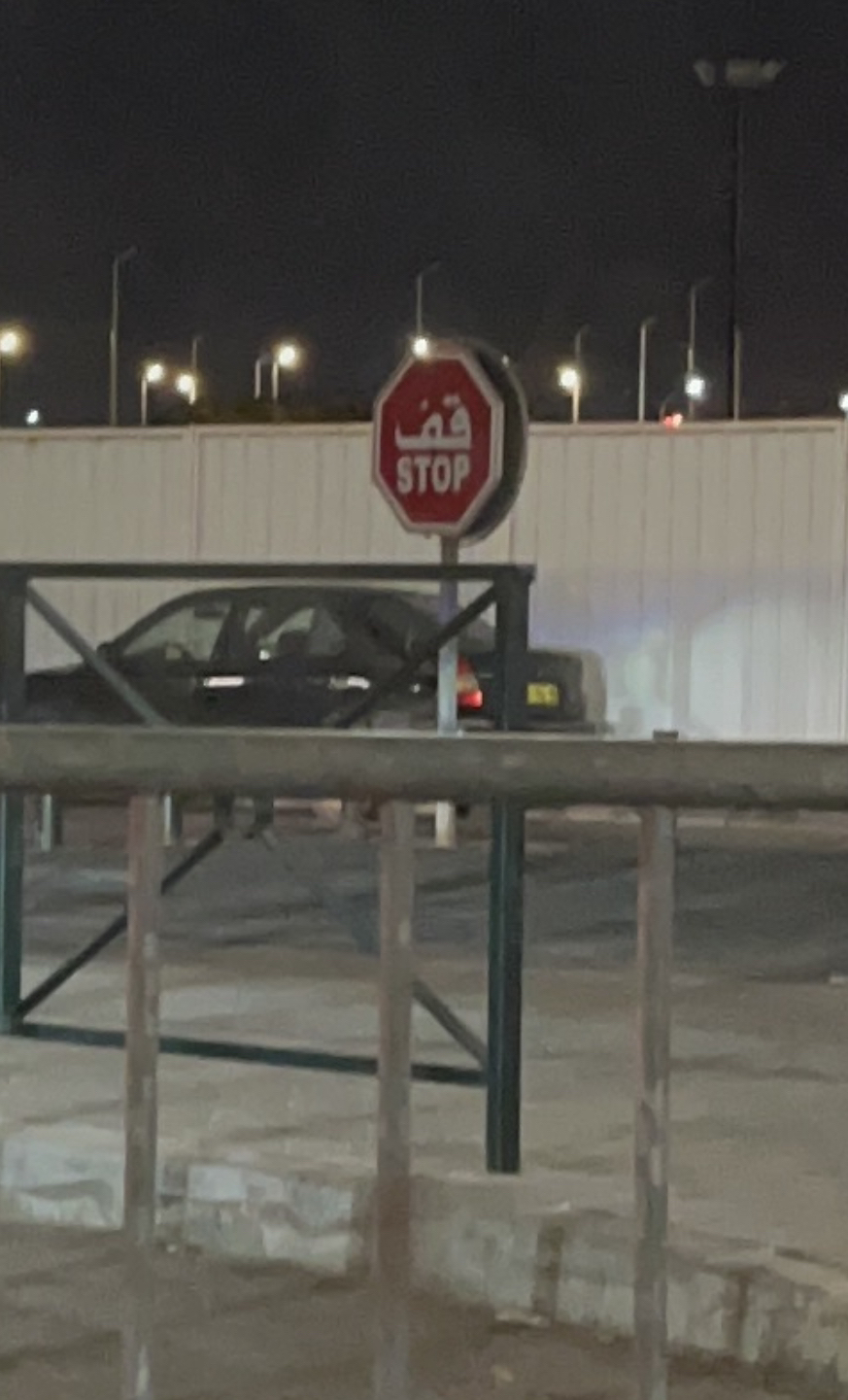
Bilingual Algerian stop sign in Arabic and in French/English

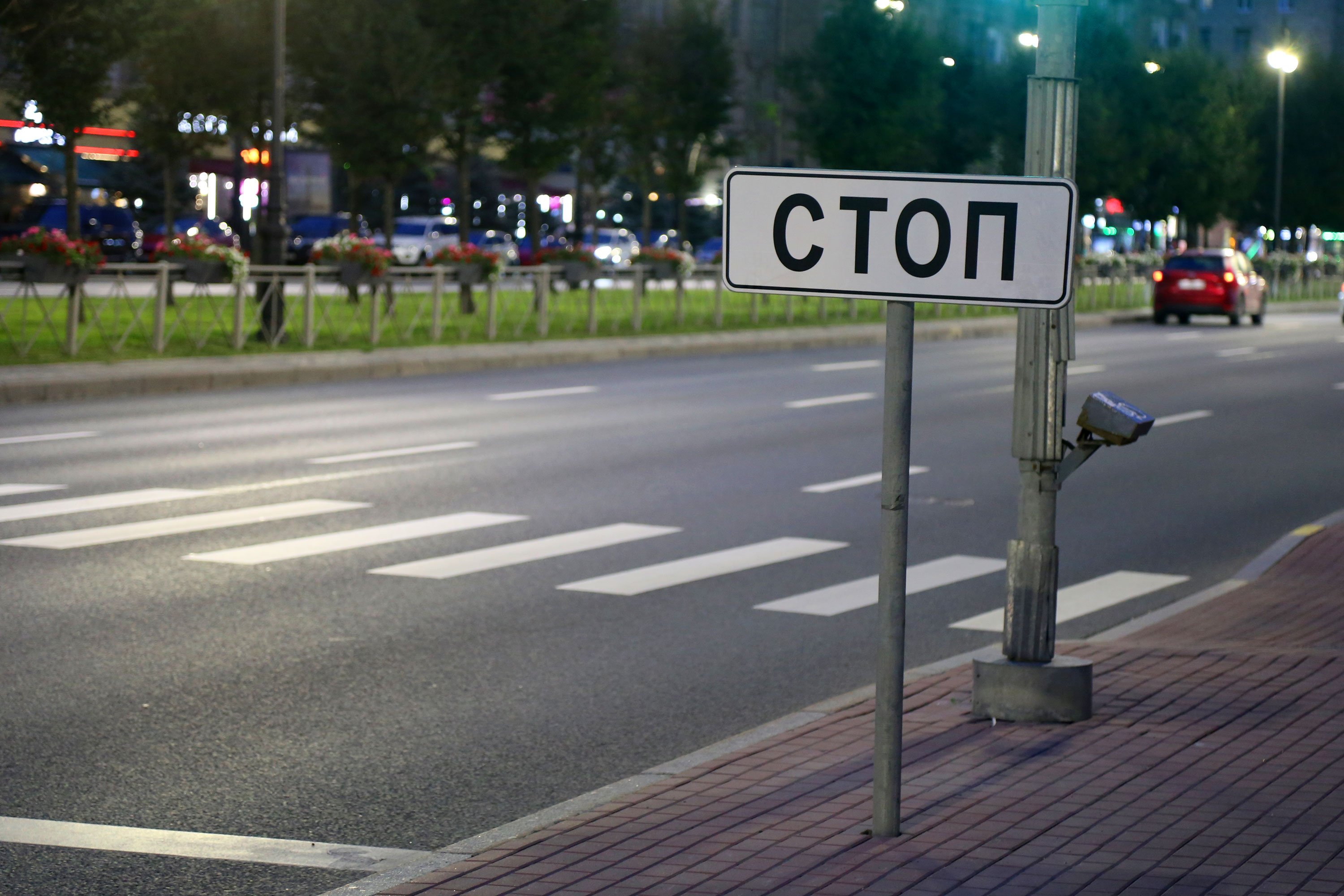
Stop sign used in Russia to indicate to drivers to stop at the line at traffic lights

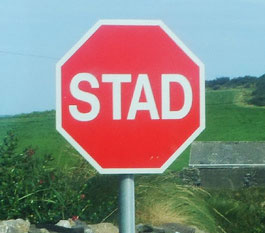
Unofficial sign seen in the Gaeltacht in Ireland. Both stad and stop are Irish words for "stop".

- Arabic-speaking countries use قف qif (except for Lebanon, which only uses stop since 2019).
- Armenia uses ԿԱՆԳ kang and stop.
- Bangladesh and Nepal use a stop sign with no text.
- Brazil and Spanish-speaking Caribbean and South American nations use pare.
- Cambodia uses ឈប់ chhob.
- China and Taiwan use 停 tíng, except that Mainland China's sign has a bolder word.
- Cuba still uses an old circular stop sign with a triangle that is used from the give way sign and black text. (Note: Formerly used in Madagascar, Tonga and Libya.)
- Ethiopia uses a version of the sign that says ቁም ḳumə and stop.
- Hong Kong SAR uses a version of the sign that says 停 tíng, and stop.
- Iran and Afghanistan use ایست ist.
- Israel and Palestine use a version of the stop sign with a raised hand.
- Japan uses a triangular sign that says 止まれ tomare and stop.
- Laos uses ຢຸດ yud.
- Malaysia and Brunei use berhenti.
- Mongolia uses ЗОГС zogs.
- Myanmar uses ရပ် raut.
- Nigeria uses a yellow border and text.
- North Korea uses 섯 sŏt.
- South Korea uses 정지 jeongji and stop.
- Pakistan still uses an old circular style stop sign with a black raised hand.
- Russian-speaking countries use either stop or стоп (i.e. stop transliterated into Russian), with the latter marking the place where vehicles should wait at traffic lights (displayed on a white rectangular sign).
- Thailand uses หยุด yùd.
- Vanuatu uses a circular red stop sign.

== Application ==
The use of stop signs varies by country. North America and South Africa use all-way stops in some intersections, unlike in some countries, where they are legally prohibited. In a majority of Central Asian countries, as well as Cuba in North America, junctions without traffic lights or roundabouts are controlled by stop signs on minor roads and by white, yellow and black priority diamond signs on the major road. In Europe and Australia, stop signs are restricted to places where coming to a dead stop is deemed necessary because of severely limited sight lines. At the vast majority of minor intersections in these countries give way signs or equivalent road markings are used, or the intersections are no-priority; roundabouts also work on the give way (rather than stop) principle.

=== North America ===
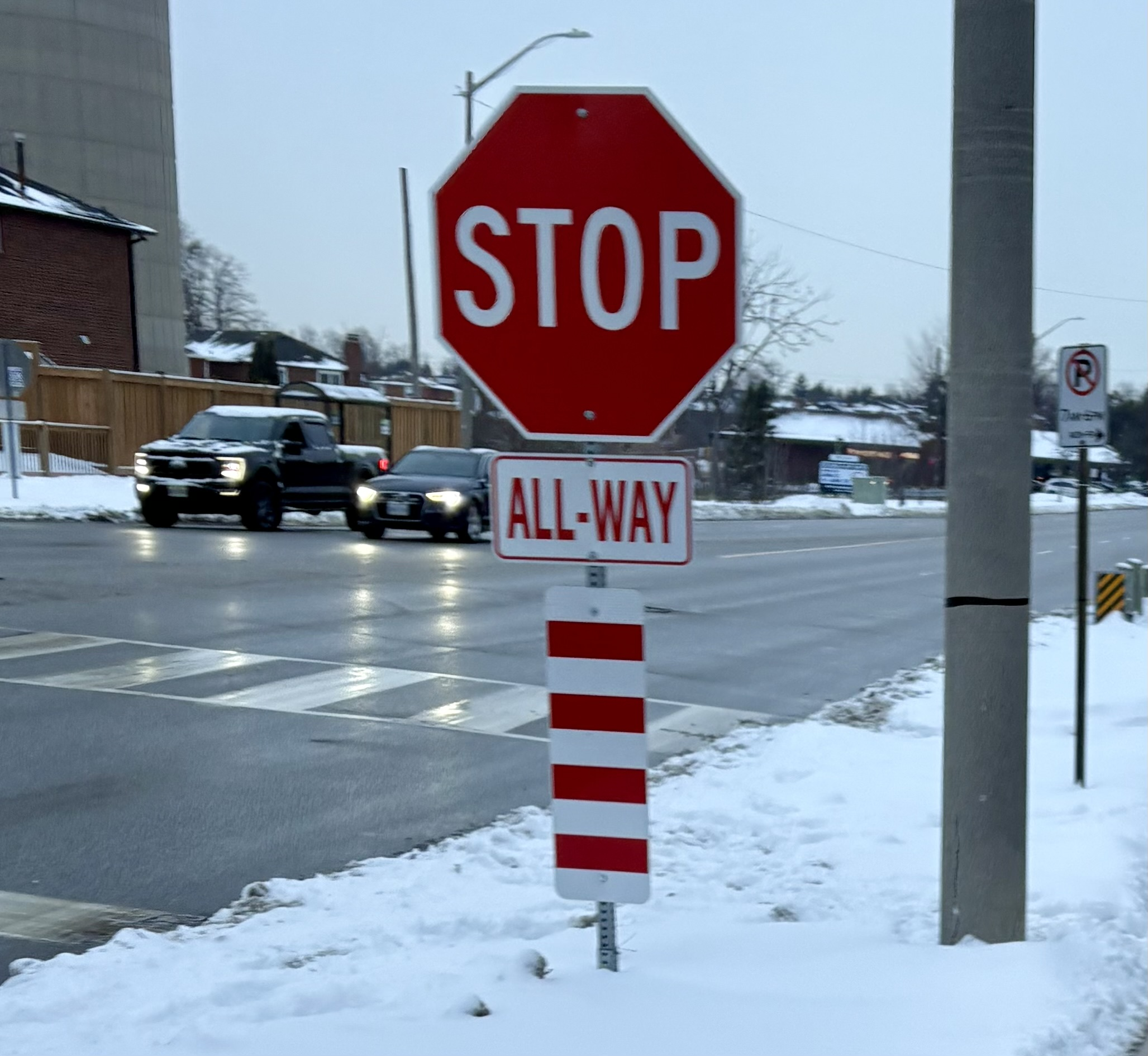
Stop sign with tiger tail in Vaughan, Ontario

Stop signs are often used in North America to control conflicting traffic movements at intersections that are deemed not busy enough to justify the installation of a traffic signal or roundabout. In the United States, the stop sign is not intended as a traffic calming device, but is meant to be installed mainly for safety or to assign right-of-way. Stop signs may be erected on all intersecting roads, resulting in an all-way stop. Some research has concluded that stop signs do not offer measurable safety benefits over the yield approach. Other research has concluded that multiway stop signs do not effectively control traffic speeds, and can give rise to negative effects including increased traffic noise and pollution from braking and accelerating vehicles, enforcement problems, and reduced sign compliance.

In Ontario, stop signs in school zones are often accompanied with "tiger tails", a red and white striped banner directly below the stop sign in order to make them stand out more to drivers.

==== On school buses ====
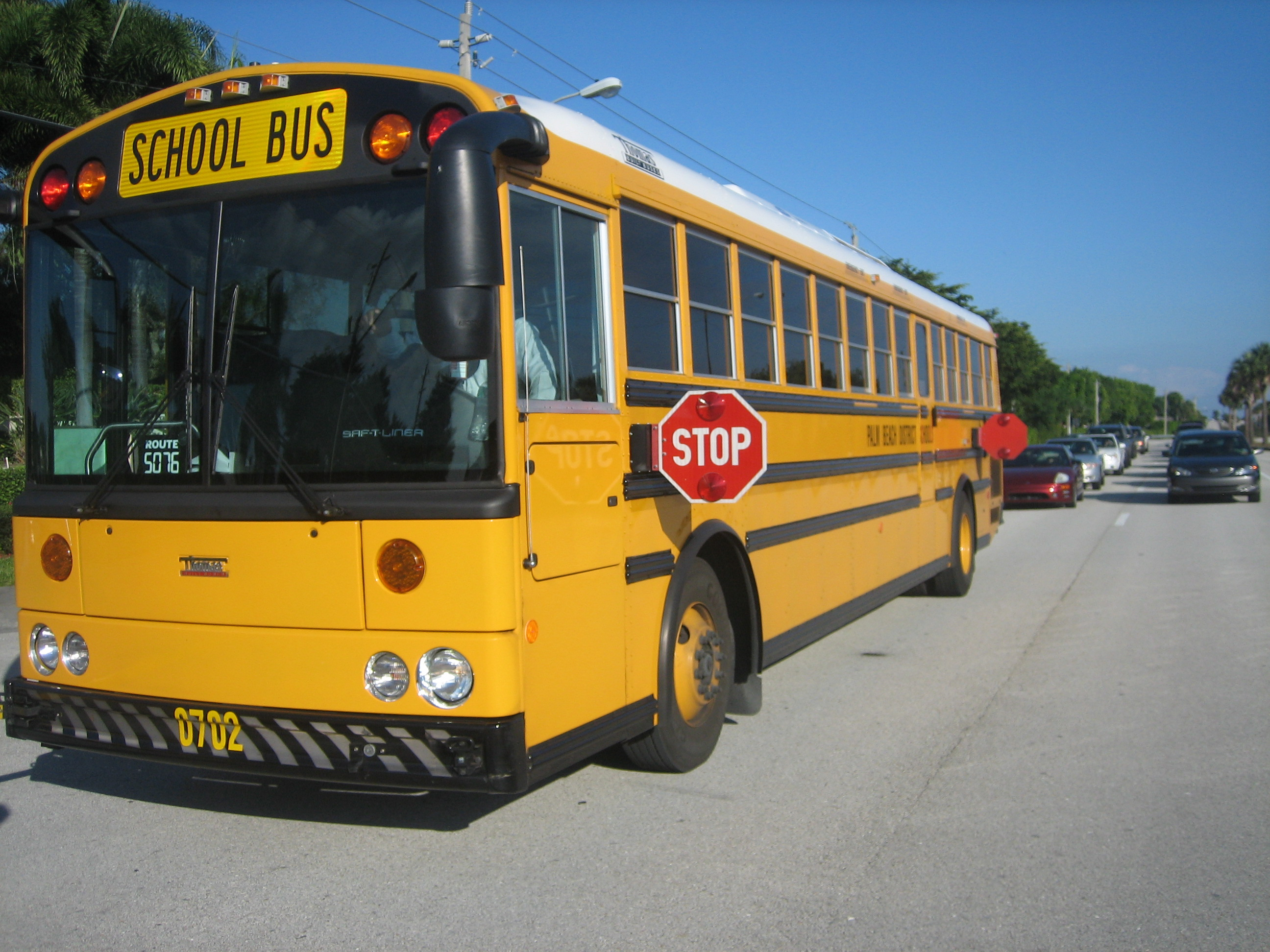
An American school bus displaying front and rear folding stop signs

A stop sign on a pivoting arm is required equipment on North American school buses. The sign normally stows flat on the left side of the bus, and is deployed by the driver when opening the door for picking up or dropping off passengers. Some buses have two such stop arms, one near the front facing forwards, and one near the rear facing backwards. The stop sign is retroreflective and equipped either with red blinking lights above and below the stop legend or with a legend that is illuminated by LEDs. Unlike a normal stop sign, this sign indicates a two-way absolute stop, requiring other vehicles travelling in both directions to remain stopped until the sign is retracted.

=== Europe ===
In Europe, stop signs are generally placed at sites where visibility is severely restricted, or where a high crash rate has been noted. In some European countries, stop signs are placed at level crossings to mark the stop line. For most situations, Europe uses the give way sign instead. All-way stops, which are common in North America, are exceedingly rare in Europe. Comparatively, roundabouts and priority to the right intersections are more common.

==== United Kingdom ====
In the United Kingdom, stop signs may only be placed at junctions with tramways or sites with severely restricted visibility. Until 2016, each stop sign had to be individually approved by the Secretary of State for Transport. This requirement was removed by the 2016 amendments to the Traffic Signs Regulations and General Directions; the responsibility for approving stop signs now lies with local authorities.

Section 79 of the Highways Act 1980 enables the government to improve visibility at junctions, as by removing or shortening walls or hedges. The Department for Transport considers improving visibility to be preferable to installing a stop sign. The former UK practice of using "Halt" or "Slow" at Major Road Ahead signs was discontinued in 1965 at the recommendation of the Worboys Committee. Instead of replacing all the old halt signs with the new Vienna Convention stop sign, the give way sign became the standard one at UK priority junctions.

== Compliance requirements ==
Laws and regulations regarding how drivers must comply with a stop sign vary by jurisdiction. In the United States and Canada, these rules are set and enforced at the state or provincial level. At a junction where two or more traffic directions are controlled by stop signs, US and Canada practice generally has the driver who arrives and stops first continue first. If two or three drivers in different directions stop simultaneously at a junction controlled by stop signs, generally the drivers on the left must yield the right-of-way to the driver on the far right.

In all countries, the driver must come to a complete stop before passing a stop sign, even if no other vehicle or pedestrian is visible. If a stop line is marked on the pavement, drivers must stop before crossing the line. Slowing but not completely stopping is called a "rolling stop", sometimes nicknamed after a city or region where it is considered endemic (e.g., "Rhode Island roll" or "California stop") – slowing down significantly but not stopping completely at the sign. This partial stop is not acceptable to most law enforcement officials, and can result in a traffic citation. However, enforcement of this rule varies widely among countries. The automobile manufacturer Tesla removed a "rolling stop" feature from its self-driving software after the National Highway Traffic Safety Administration complained the practice is unsafe and illegal everywhere in the United States.

In some countries, such as Czechia and Russia, stopping is required only at a place where a driver has a sufficient view into the intersection, not at the border of the intersection (where a "STOP" line is not present). Therefore, if multiple drivers come from the same direction and all of them stop at appropriate place, they can continue without stopping again.

=== Bicyclists ===
In some jurisdictions, such as the U.S. state of Idaho, the traffic code allows for bicyclists approaching a stop sign to slow down and yield to conflicting traffic, then proceed without stopping unless safety requires a full stop ("stop as yield"). The Idaho law has been in effect since 1982 and has not been shown to be detrimental to safety. Since 2017, more states have implemented changes to the law similar to Idaho's: Delaware (2017), Oregon (2020), Washington (2020), Utah (2021) and North Dakota (2021). The District of Columbia also implemented a law similar to Idaho's in 2023. Cyclist advocacy groups have sought similar "Idaho stop" laws for other jurisdictions in the United States.

== Disadvantages ==
Stop sign placement can pose difficulties and hazards in applications where cross traffic is not controlled by a sign or light. Relatively long distance between the stop sign and the crossroad facilitates accurate perception of the speed of approaching cross traffic, but lengthens the time and distance required to enter and clear the junction. Relatively short distance between the stop sign and the crossroad shortens the time required for safe passage through the intersection, but degrades the ability of the stopped driver to accurately perceive the speed of approaching cross traffic. Specifically, drivers approaching an intersection from beyond the subtended angular velocity detection threshold (SAVT) limit may be perceived by a stopped driver as standing still rather than approaching, which means the stopped driver may not make an accurate decision as to whether it is safe to proceed past the stop sign. Whether the distance between the stop sign and the crossroad is officially short or is shortened by drivers creeping past the stop line, they can lose the visual acuity of lateral motion, leaving them to rely on the SAVT. This can make it challenging to accurately estimate the movement of approaching cross traffic. According to recent game-theoretical analysis, at intersections where all directions face stop signs, drivers have strong incentives to run the stop sign. A better solution is to randomly remove one stop sign from all directions, which could lead to significant efficiency gains while ensuring safe traffic.

== Gallery ==
Algeria

Armenia

Austria

Bangladesh, Nepal

Belgium, Bulgaria, Romania, Croatia

Bhutan

Bosnia and Herzegovina

Brazil

Brunei

Cambodia

Canada — Québec (in Cree)

Quebec, Canada

Central America

China

Cuba

Cyprus

Denmark

Estonia

Ethiopia

Finland

France, Francophone Africa, Haiti, Monaco

Germany, Czech Republic, Georgia, Latvia, SADC, North Macedonia, Vietnam

Greece

Hong Kong

Hungary

Indonesia

Iran, Afghanistan

Ireland

Israel, Palestine

Italy, Albania, Burundi, Lebanon, Malta, San Marino, Sierra Leone, Vatican City

Jamaica

Japan

Laos

Luxembourg

Malaysia

Macau SAR, Portugal (1971–1994)

Mexico

Mongolia

Morocco, Mauritania, Libya

Myanmar

Netherlands, Aruba, Suriname

Nigeria

Norway

North Korea

Pakistan

Philippines, Sri Lanka

Poland

Portugal, Lusophone Africa

Russia, Azerbaijan, Belarus, Kazakhstan, Kyrgyzstan, Lithuania, Tajikistan, Turkmenistan, Ukraine, Uzbekistan

Serbia, Montenegro, Slovenia

Singapore

Slovakia

South America, Dominican Republic, Puerto Rico

Somaliland

South Korea

Spain

Sweden

Switzerland, Liechtenstein

Taiwan

Thailand

Tunisia

Turkey

United Arab Emirates, Saudi Arabia, Egypt, Bahrain, Iraq, Jordan, Kuwait, Oman, Qatar, Yemen

United Kingdom, India, Anglophone Africa, Anglophone Caribbean (Lesser Antilles), Mauritius, Seychelles

United States, English-speaking Canada, Australia, New Zealand, Spain, Andorra, Belize, Fiji, Guyana, Papua New Guinea, Tonga

Vanuatu

=== Historical gallery ===
The following are some older stop sign designs:

Australia (1946–1960)

Austria (1945–1960)

Belgium

Brazil (1941–1954)

Czechoslovakia (1945–1951)

Finland (1957–1971)

Germany (before 1937)

Germany (1938–1953 for FRG/1956 for GDR)

Greece (before 1982)

Hungary

Hungary (1953–1962)

Italy (1959–1990)

Iceland (1945–1956)

Iceland (1956–1975)

Japan (1950–1960)

Japan (1960–1963)

Japan (1963–2017)

Kenya

Libya

Mexico

Mexico (until 2023)

New Zealand (1933–1966)

Netherlands (1941-1951)

Netherlands (1951-1966)

North Korea

Norway (1949-1955)

Norway (1955-1974)

Poland

Romania (1957–1961)

Romania (1961–1970)

Romania (1970–1971)

Slovakia (until 2015)

South Africa (1951–1974)

South Africa (1974–1993)

South Vietnam (1955–1975)

Soviet Union (1980–1991)

Spain (1962–1976)

Spain (1976–1992)

Spain (1992–2023) (Note: Still used in Djibouti and Equatorial Guinea.)

Sweden (1951–1976)

Switzerland (1949–1979)

Switzerland (1979–2003)

Taiwan (1954–1968)

Thailand

Tonga (until 2025)

Turkey (1952–196?)

Turkey (196?–1975)

United Kingdom (1965–1975)

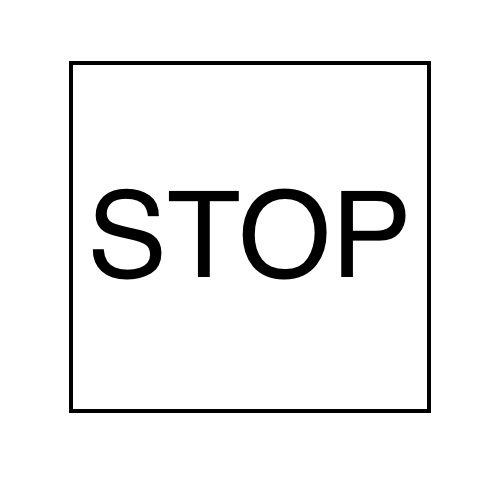
United States, Detroit (1915–1925)

United States (1927–1935) Used in rural areas

United States (1930–1935) Used in urban areas

United States (1935–1941)

United States (1941–1954)

Zambia

Zimbabwe (1965–2016)

== See also ==
- All-way stop
- Assured clear distance ahead
- Road safety
- Roundabout
- Rules of the road
- Stopping sight distance
- Traffic psychology
- War of the stop signs
- Yield sign
