= Skrovnik =

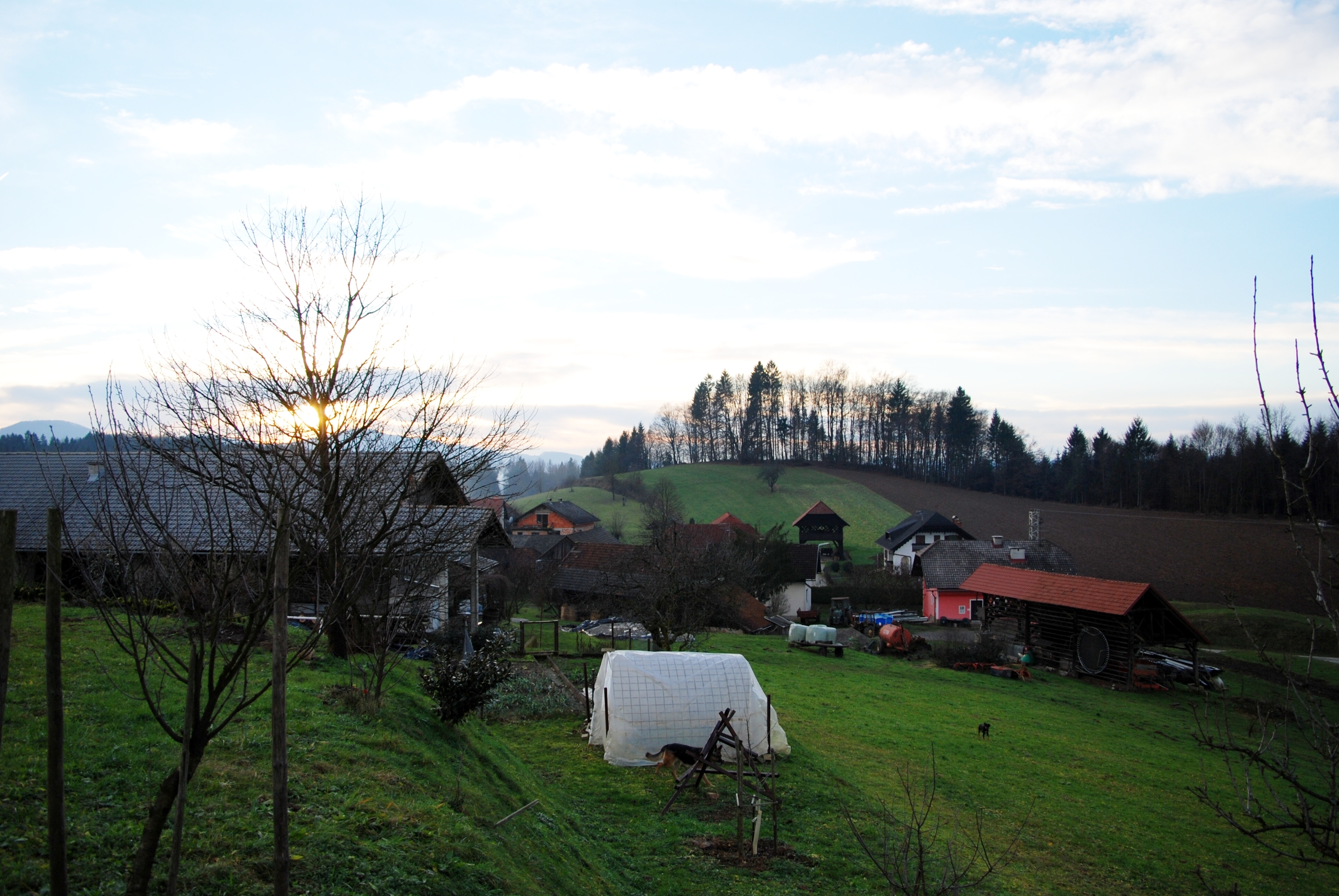

- Location in Slovenia
- Coordinates: 45°57′46.41″N 15°9′58.69″E
- Country: Slovenia
- Traditional region: Lower Carniola
- Statistical region: Lower Sava
- Municipality: Sevnica

Area
  - Total: 1.13 km^{2} (0.44 sq mi)
- Elevation: 260.3 m (854 ft)

Population (2002)
  - Total: 64

Skrovnik (pronounced [ˈskɾoːu̯nik]) is a small settlement in the Municipality of Sevnica in east-central Slovenia. It lies on the left bank of the Mirna River northeast of Mokronog on the regional road to Tržišče in the historical region of Lower Carniola. The municipality is now included in the Lower Sava Statistical Region.
