= Kamensko =

Kamensko may refer to:

- Kamensko, Bulgaria, a village in Burgas Province
- Kamensko, Bosnia and Herzegovina, a village near Olovo
- Kamensko, Primorje-Gorski Kotar County, a village near Vrbovsko, Croatia
- Kamensko, Split-Dalmatia County, a village near Trilj, Croatia
- Kamensko, Karlovac, a part of the city of Karlovac, Croatia
- Kamensko, Montenegro, a village near Nikšić
- Kamensko (company), a former textile company in Zagreb, Croatia
- Kamenško, a village in southeastern Slovenia

== See also ==
- Kamenska
