= Kamenica, Sevnica =

Kamenica
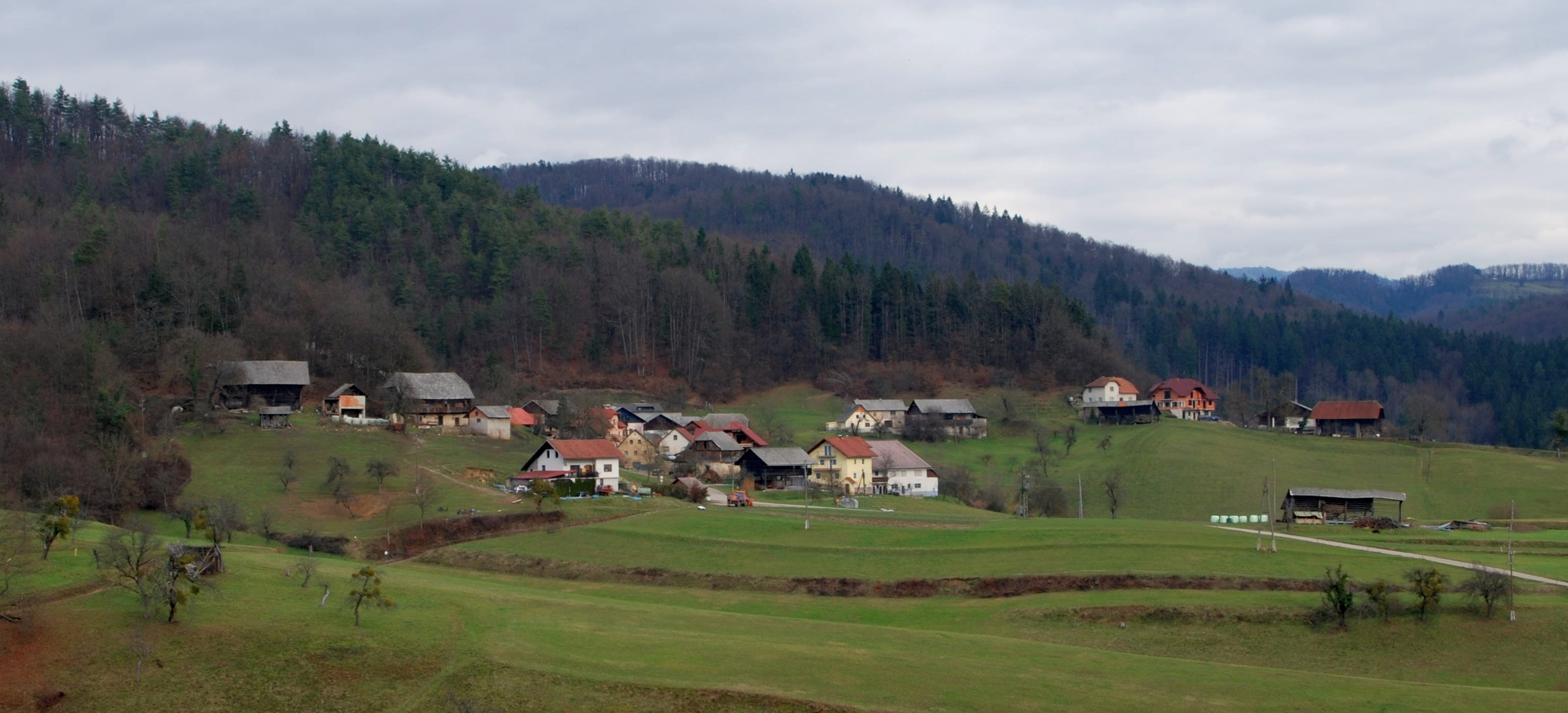
- Kamenica from the southwest

- Location in Slovenia
- Coordinates: 45°59′48.01″N 15°11′56.17″E
- Country: Slovenia
- Traditional region: Lower Carniola
- Statistical region: Lower Sava
- Municipality: Sevnica

Area
  - Total: 1.53 km^{2} (0.59 sq mi)
- Elevation: 306.5 m (1,006 ft)

Population (2012)
  - Total: 40
  - Density: 26/km^{2} (67/sq mi)

Kamenica (pronounced [ˈkaːmɛnitsa]) is a small village northeast of Krmelj in the Municipality of Sevnica in central Slovenia. The area is part of the historical region of Lower Carniola. The municipality is now included in the Lower Sava Statistical Region. Until 2001, the settlement included the area of now autonomous settlement of Kamenško.

== St. Margaret's Church ==
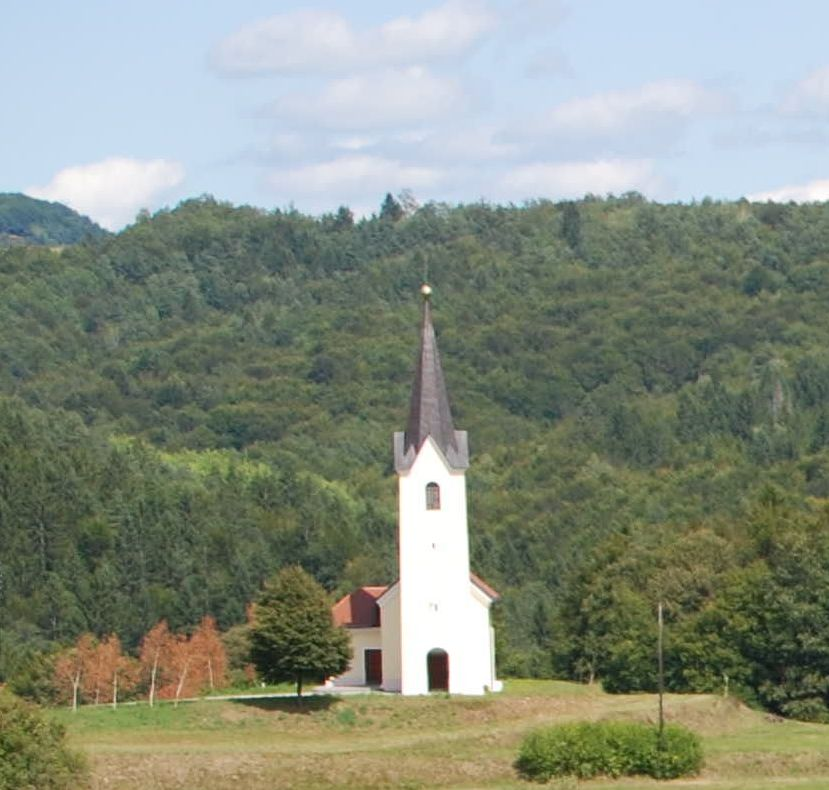
St. Margaret's Church

The local church built on a small hill southeast of the settlement is dedicated to Saint Margaret (Slovene: sveta Marjeta) and belongs to the Parish of Šentjanž. It was built around 1700 on the site of an earlier building.
