= Slančji Vrh =

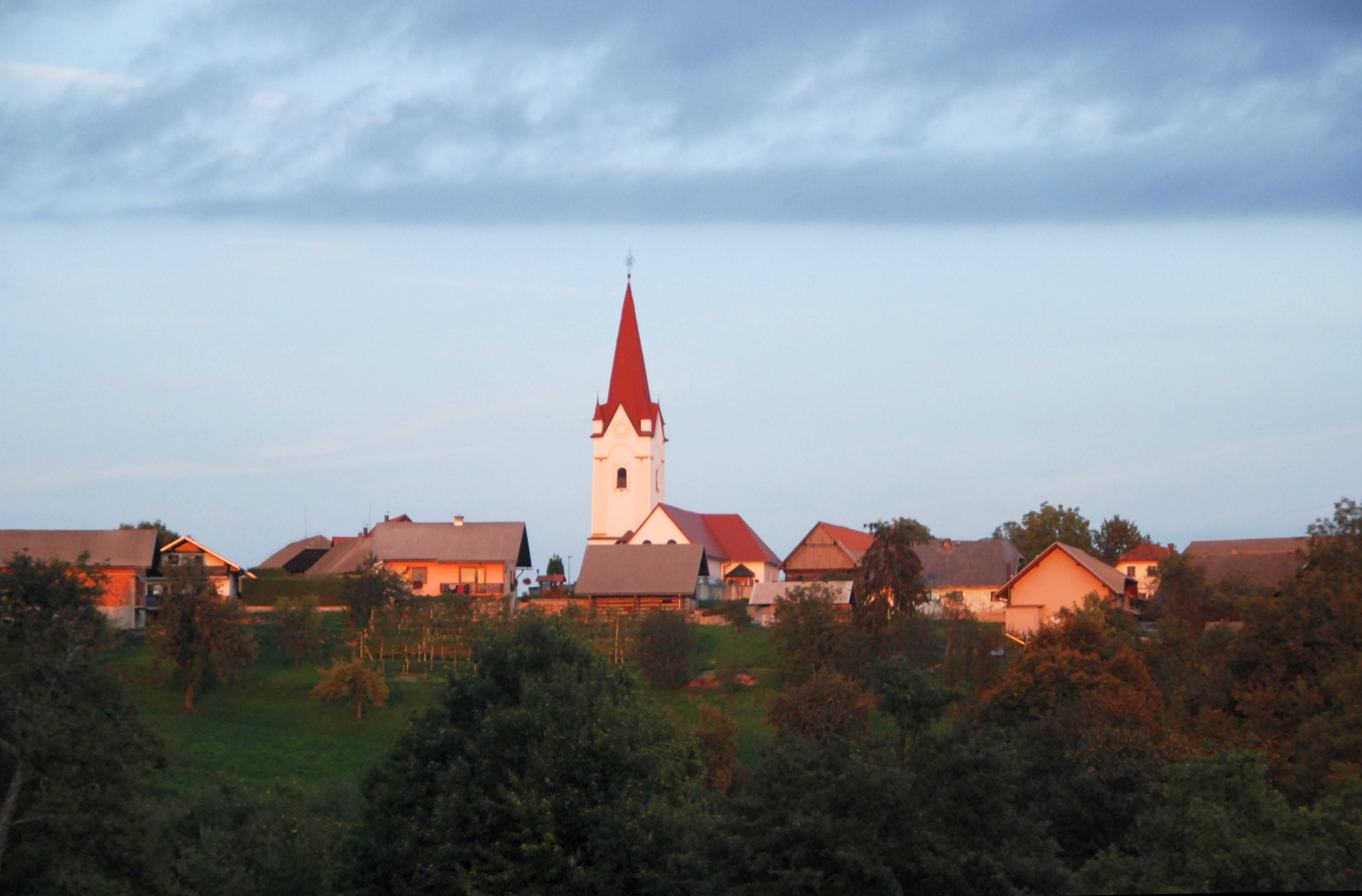
- Slančji Vrh (view from the west)

- Location in Slovenia
- Coordinates: 45°57′6.8″N 15°13′53.08″E
- Country: Slovenia
- Traditional region: Lower Carniola
- Statistical region: Lower Sava
- Municipality: Sevnica

Area
  - Total: 0.98 km^{2} (0.38 sq mi)
- Elevation: 466.5 m (1,531 ft)

Population (2002)
  - Total: 38

Slančji Vrh (pronounced [ˈslaːntʃi ˈʋərx]) is a small nucleated village in the Municipality of Sevnica in east-central Slovenia. The area is part of the historical region of Lower Carniola. The municipality is now included in the Lower Sava Statistical Region.

The local church is dedicated to Saint Ulrich (Slovene: sveti Urh) and belongs to the Parish of Tržišče. It is a medieval building with a number of additions and rebuilding phases over the centuries.
