= Kamenško =

- Location in Slovenia
- Coordinates: 46°0′1″N 15°11′28″E
- Country: Slovenia
- Traditional region: Lower Carniola
- Statistical region: Lower Sava Slovenia
- Municipality: Sevnica

Area
  - Total: 0.6 km^{2} (0.23 sq mi)

Population (2014)
  - Total: 14
  - Density: 22/km^{2} (57/sq mi)
- Postal code: 8296

Kamenško (pronounced [ˈkaːmɛnškɔ]) is a small village in the Municipality of Sevnica in southeastern Slovenia. It lies on a small rise northeast of Krmelj, east of the road connecting Krmelj and Šentjanž, above and to the north of the villages of Brezje and Kamenica. Until 2001, the area was part of the settlement of Kamenica. The village is part of the traditional region of Lower Carniola and is included in the Lower Sava Statistical Region.
