= Hantine =

- Location in Slovenia
- Coordinates: 45°58′38″N 15°16′03″E
- Country: Slovenia
- Traditional region: Lower Carniola
- Statistical region: Lower Sava
- Municipality: Sevnica
- Elevation: 441 m (1,447 ft)

Hantine (pronounced [hanˈtiːnɛ]; in some sources also Hantina, Hentina, or Hentine) is a former settlement in the Municipality of Sevnica in central Slovenia. It is now part of the village of Drušče. The area is part of the traditional region of Lower Carniola. The municipality is now included in the Lower Sava Statistical Region.

== Geography ==
Hantine is located about 900 meters (3,000 ft) north of Drušče in a clearing in the forest, in hills rising above the Mirna River. Radovan Creek, a tributary of the Mirna, has its source west of the Blatnik farm in the settlement. Geologically, the settlement stands on solid, partly brecciated limestone mixed with hornstone and dark platy limestone lying above Middle Triassic dolomite.

== Name ==
Hantine was attested in historical sources as Quinteyd before 1406, Quintyn in 1421, and Quintin in 1423.

== History ==
Hantine was deemed annexed by Drušče in 1952, ending any existence it had as an independent settlement.
