= Brezje, Sevnica =

Brezje
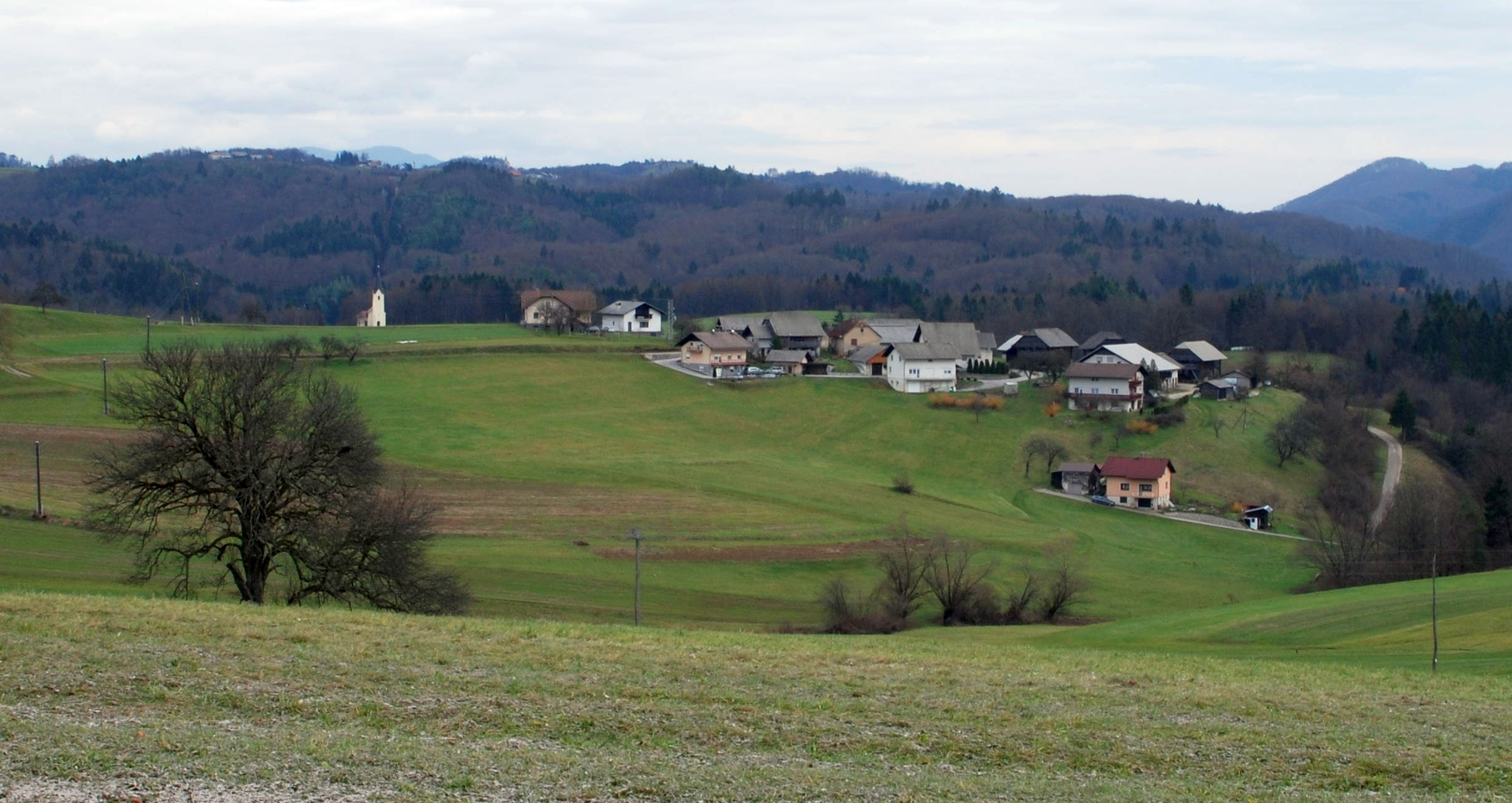
- View of Brezje from Hinjce

- Location in Slovenia
- Coordinates: 45°59′25.03″N 15°11′49.58″E
- Country: Slovenia
- Traditional region: Lower Carniola
- Statistical region: Lower Sava
- Municipality: Sevnica

Area
  - Total: 0.25 km^{2} (0.097 sq mi)

Population (2013)
  - Total: 17
  - Density: 68/km^{2} (180/sq mi)
- Postal code: 8296

Brezje (pronounced [ˈbɾeːzjɛ]) is a small village in the Municipality of Sevnica in southeastern Slovenia. It lies on a small rise east of Krmelj and the village of Hinjce and west of the Mirna River. The village is part of the traditional region of Lower Carniola and is included in the Lower Sava Statistical Region. One of the two roads from Krmelj to the main road linking Mokronog and Sevnica runs through the settlement, in the valley south of the village core. A cattle trough stands on its right side at the crossroad leading from it into the village. It was built in the 1940s.

== Name ==
Brezje was attested in written sources as Pirkch in 1455 and Pirgk in 1467. The name Brezje literally means 'birch woods', derived from the common noun breza 'birch'. Like similar toponyms in Slovenia (e.g., Brezova, Brezovec, Brezovci), it originally referred to the local vegetation.

== History ==
Until 2006, the area was part of the settlement of Goveji Dol.
