= Sevnica–Trebnje Railway =

Railway line in Slovenia

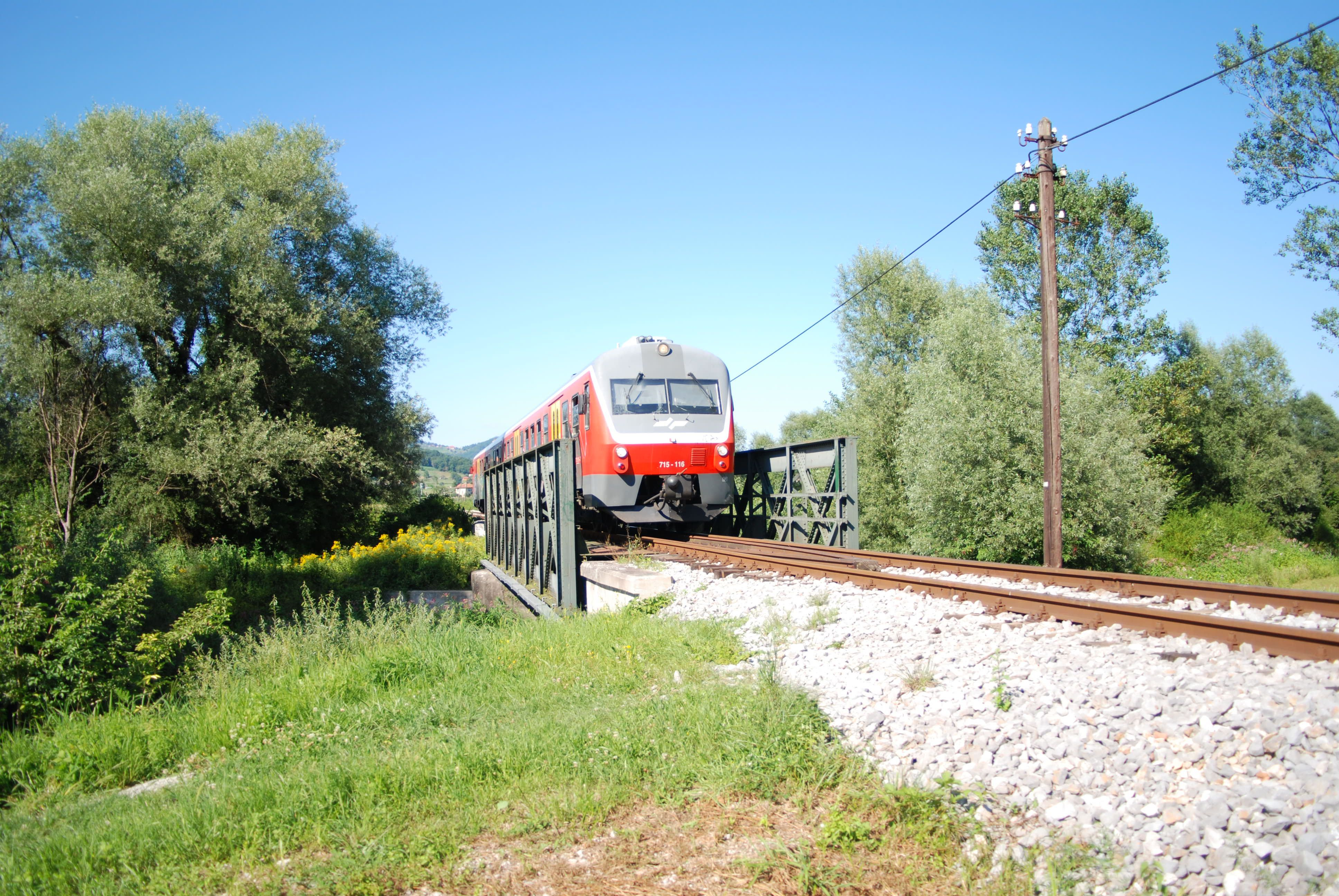
- Passenger train on the Sevnica–Trebnje Railway crossing the bridge over the Mirna at the settlement of Mirna

Overview
- Owner: Slovenian Railway Network
- Locale: Slovenija
- Termini: Sevnica railway station; Trebnje railway station

Service
- System: Slovenian Railways

History
- Opened: 8 December 1938

Technical
- Line length: 31.2 km (19.4 mi)
- Number of tracks: 1
- Track gauge: 1,435 mm (4 ft 8 1/2 in) standard gauge

The Sevnica–Trebnje Railway (Slovene: Železniška proga Sevnica–Trebnje) is one of the railway lines that form the Slovenian Railway Network. It is located in Lower Carniola, the traditional region of southeastern Slovenia. Its termini are in Sevnica and Trebnje, and it is 31.2 kilometres (19.4 mi) long, non-electrified and single-tracked. It is used by both passenger and freight trains.

== Course ==
The line crosses the Sava River and enters the Mirna Valley, where it then crosses the Mirna and the Bistrica rivers. It runs through the settlements of Dolenji Boštanj, Tržišče, Pijavice, Slovenska Vas, and Mirna. The largest structure on the line is the 158-metre (518 ft) Sava River bridge at Sevnica, built in 1938.

== History ==
The prime reason for the line was the coal mine in Krmelj. The section between Trebnje and Krmelj was built in 1908. Between 1936 and 1938 the route was extended from Tržišče to Sevnica. The mine was closed in 1962 and the track removed in 1996, while the line from Sevnica to Trebnje through Tržišče has remained open.

=== Role during the 2023 flood ===
Heavy rainfall on 4 August 2023 damaged the main line Ljubljana from Zidani Most in several places and made it impassable. This would have completely cut off the western part of the Slovenian railway network from the east, had it not been for the use of the alternative line from Ljubljana to Sevnica via Trebnje, which proved to be much more flood-resistant than the main line. On the morning of 5 August, the only possibility to travel between the Slovenian capital Ljubljana and the second-largest city, Maribor, was this railway line and a subsequent rail replacement bus between Sevnica and Celje.

== Sources ==
- Rustja, Karol. Dolenjske proge. (in Slovene) Tiri in čas, 6. Slovenske železnice - Železniški muzej. Ljubljana, 1994. ISBN 86-81445-06-5.
