= Velika Preska =

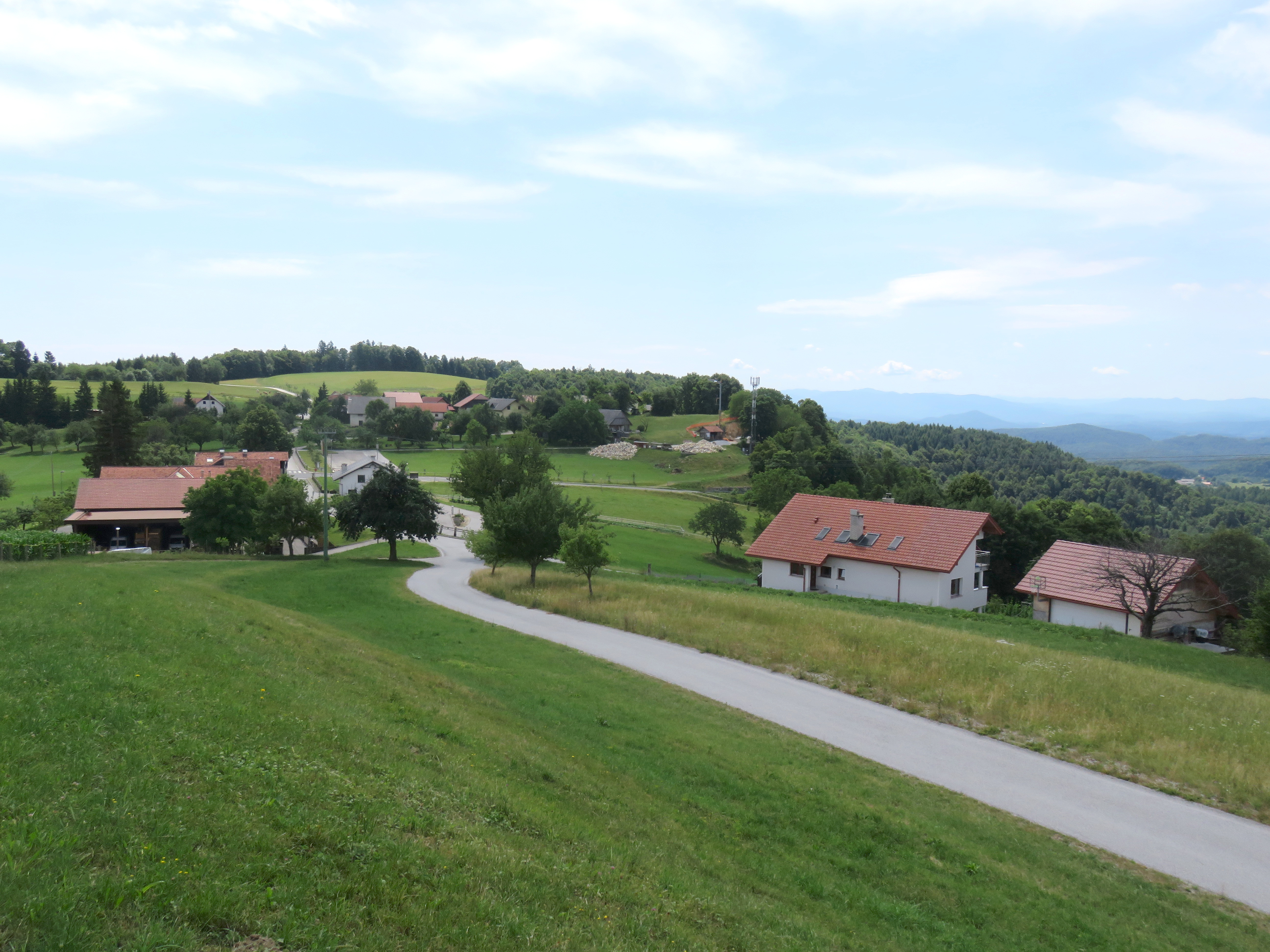

- Location in Slovenia
- Coordinates: 46°2′35.12″N 14°57′43.23″E
- Country: Slovenia
- Traditional region: Lower Carniola
- Statistical region: Central Sava
- Municipality: Litija

Area
  - Total: 1.76 km^{2} (0.68 sq mi)
- Elevation: 788.1 m (2,586 ft)

Population (2002)
  - Total: 52
- Postal code: 1272

Velika Preska (pronounced [ˈʋeːlika ˈpɾeːska]) is a settlement in the hills west of Dole pri Litiji in central Slovenia. The area is part of the traditional region of Lower Carniola and is now included with the rest of the Municipality of Litija in the Central Sava Statistical Region.
