= Gabrje, Sevnica =

Gabrje
- Location in Slovenia
- Coordinates: 45°59′6.75″N 15°13′7.12″E
- Country: Slovenia
- Traditional region: Lower Carniola
- Statistical region: Lower Sava
- Municipality: Sevnica

Area
  - Total: 1.02 km^{2} (0.39 sq mi)
- Elevation: 270 m (890 ft)

Population (2002)
  - Total: 63

Gabrje (pronounced [ˈɡaːbəɾjɛ]; in older sources also Gabrije) is a small settlement on the right bank of the Mirna River in the Municipality of Sevnica in central Slovenia. The area is part of the historical region of Lower Carniola. The municipality is now included in the Lower Sava Statistical Region.
