= Dolenji Boštanj =

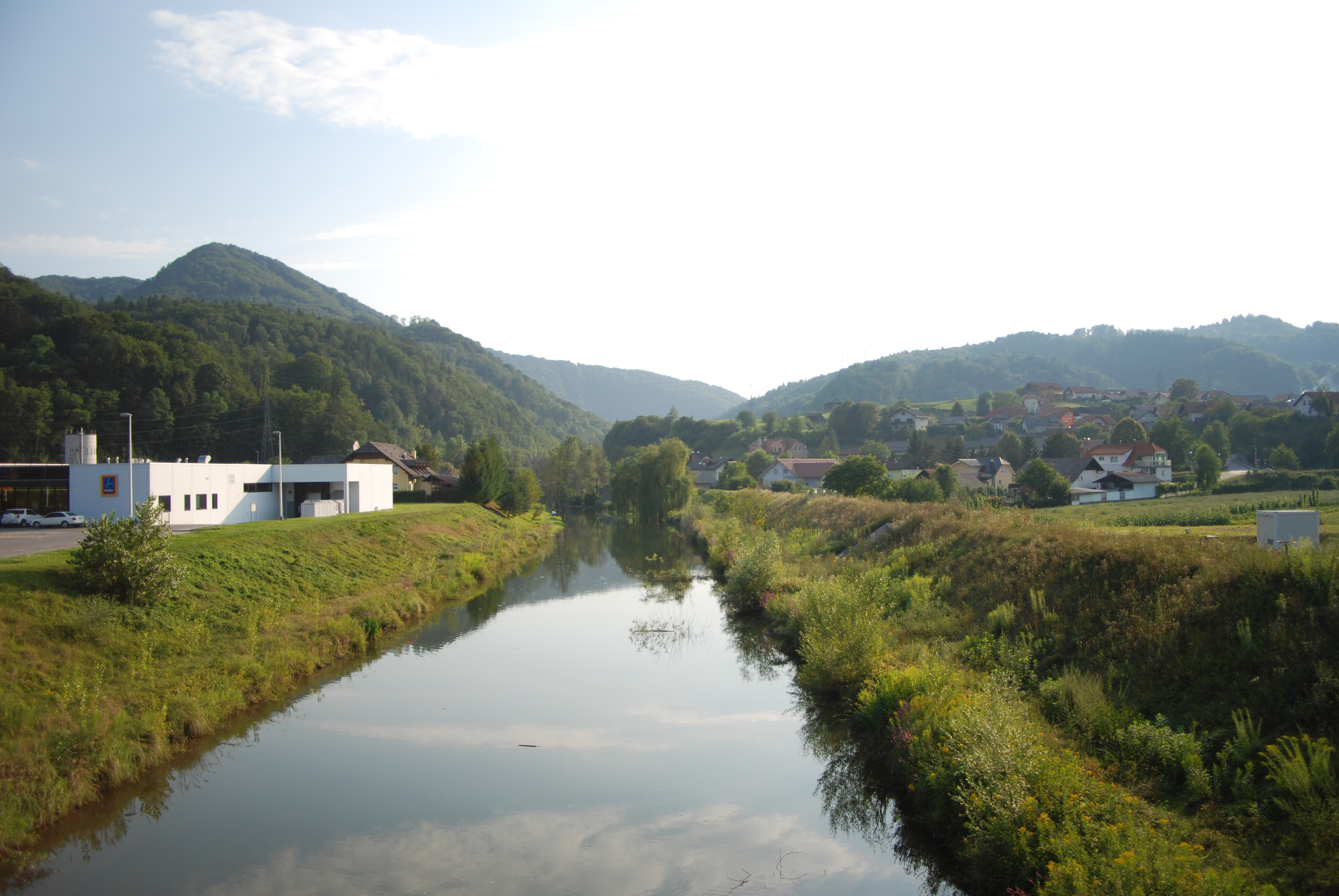

- Location in Slovenia
- Coordinates: 46°2′29.43″N 15°13′52.11″E
- Country: Slovenia
- Traditional region: Lower Carniola
- Statistical region: Lower Sava
- Municipality: Sevnica

Area
  - Total: 1.44 km^{2} (0.56 sq mi)
- Elevation: 189 m (620 ft)

Population (2002)
  - Total: 89

Dolenji Boštanj (pronounced [dɔˈleːnji bɔˈʃtaːn]; German: Untersavenstein) is a settlement in the Municipality of Sevnica in central Slovenia. It lies near the confluence of the Mirna River with the Sava in Lower Carniola. The municipality is now included in the Lower Sava Statistical Region. The rail line from Sevnica to Trebnje runs through the settlement and has a station there.

== Boštanj Manor ==
Boštanj Manor (German: Hof Savenstein), locally known as Gradič'k 'little castle', stands above the main road in the settlement. It was erected by the Wernegkh noble family before 1636. After 1782, the owners were the Buseth and Lichtenthurn families. At that time, it was damaged by the French, who established the Illyrian Provinces in the area. After 1826, the Planinc family owned the castle. After 1867, it was owned by the Juvančič family and then the Lipar family. It is probably the successor of Unter Rein Manor, built in the 16th century by the Gallenstein noble family.
