= Tržišče, Sevnica =

Tržišče
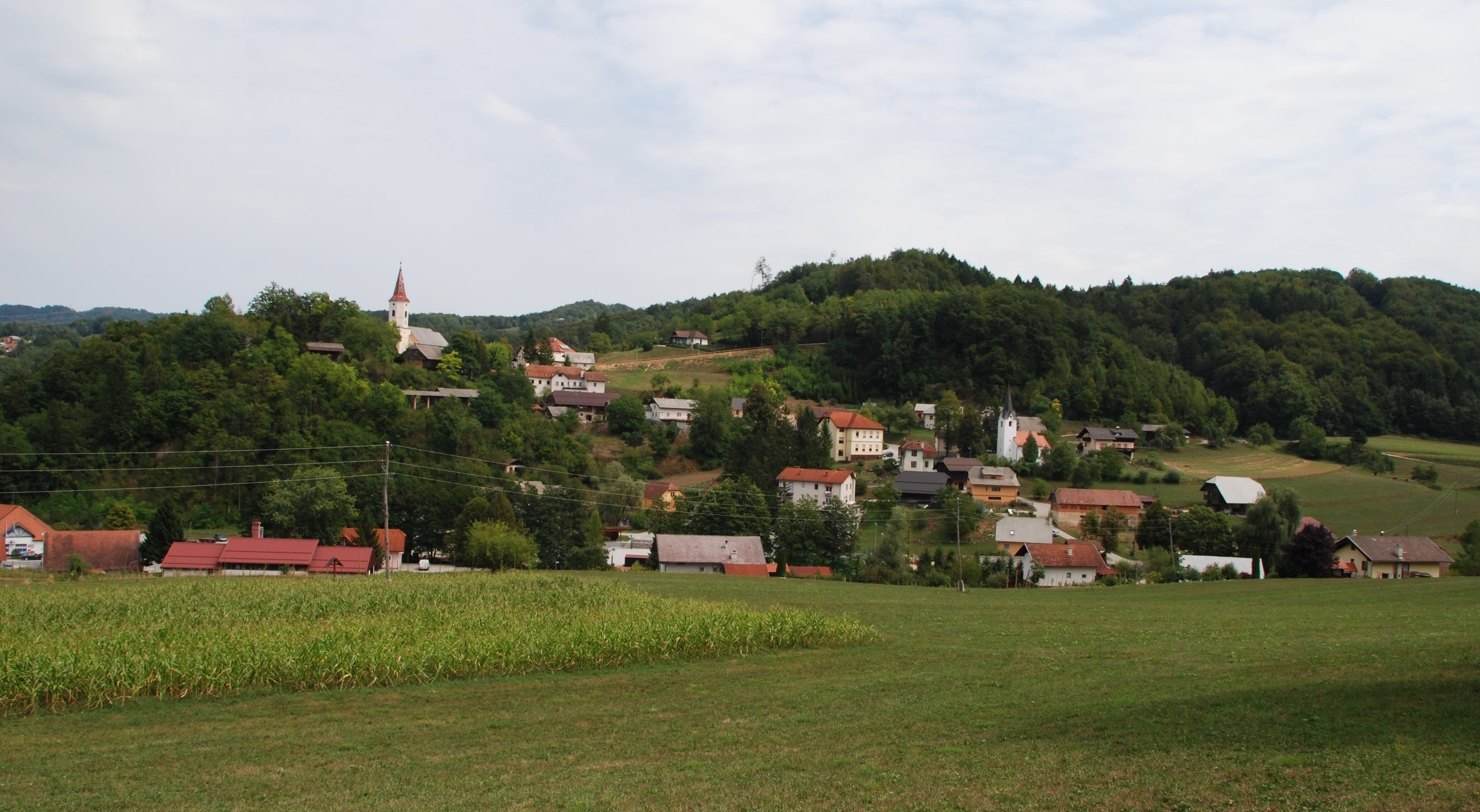

- Location in Slovenia
- Coordinates: 45°57′29.08″N 15°11′38.02″E
- Country: Slovenia
- Traditional region: Lower Carniola
- Statistical region: Lower Sava
- Municipality: Sevnica

Area
  - Total: 1.47 km^{2} (0.57 sq mi)
- Elevation: 251.7 m (826 ft)

Population (2012)
  - Total: 203
  - Density: 139/km^{2} (360/sq mi)

Tržišče (pronounced [təɾˈʒiːʃtʃɛ]; German: Terschische) is a settlement along the road linking Mokronog and Sevnica in the Lower Carniola region in east-central Slovenia. It is part of the Municipality of Sevnica, which is included in the Lower Sava Statistical Region. St. George's Hill (Slovene: Šentjurjev hrib; 366 metres or 1,201 feet) lies to the northwest of the village. The rail line from Sevnica to Trebnje runs through the settlement and has a station there. The settlement includes the hamlets of Mostec and Sveta Trojica (German: Heiligendreifaltigkeit).

== Churches ==
The parish church in the settlement is dedicated to the Holy Trinity (Slovene: Sveta Trojica) and belongs to the Roman Catholic Diocese of Novo Mesto. It dates to the first quarter of the 16th century. A second church in the southern part of the settlement is dedicated to the Assumption of Mary and was originally a 13th-century building that was rebuilt around 1700.
