= Mirna (Sava) =

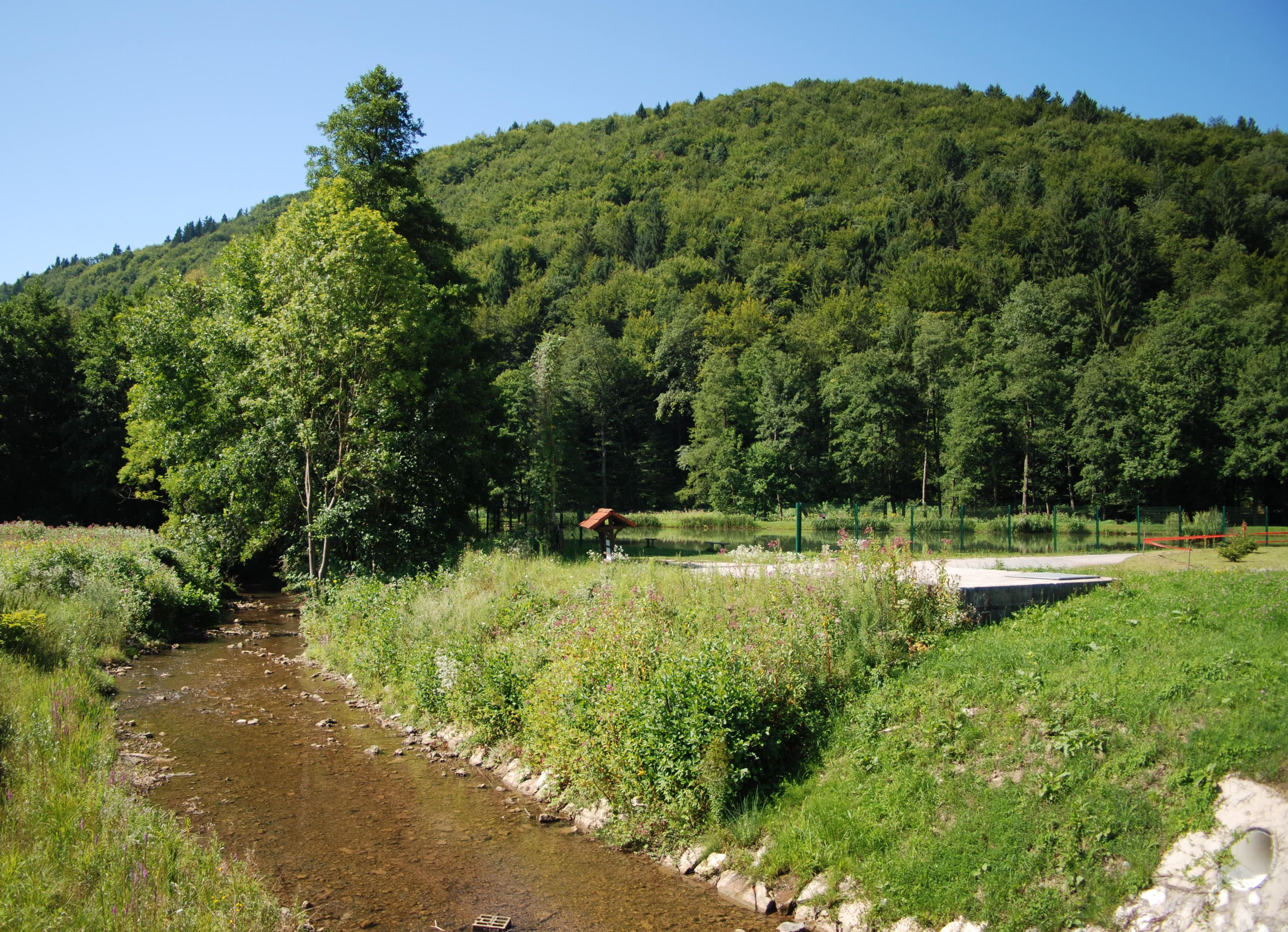
- The Mirna River at Mirna Castle, before the confluence with Vejar Creek (downstream view). Mirna Pond to the right is a dammed pond on Vejar Creek.

Location
- Country: Slovenia

Physical characteristics
- Mouth
  - location: Sava
  - coordinates: 46.0082°N 15.2941°E
- Length: 44 km (27 mi)
- Basin size: 294 km^{2} (114 sq mi)

Basin features
- Progression: Sava→ Danube→ Black Sea

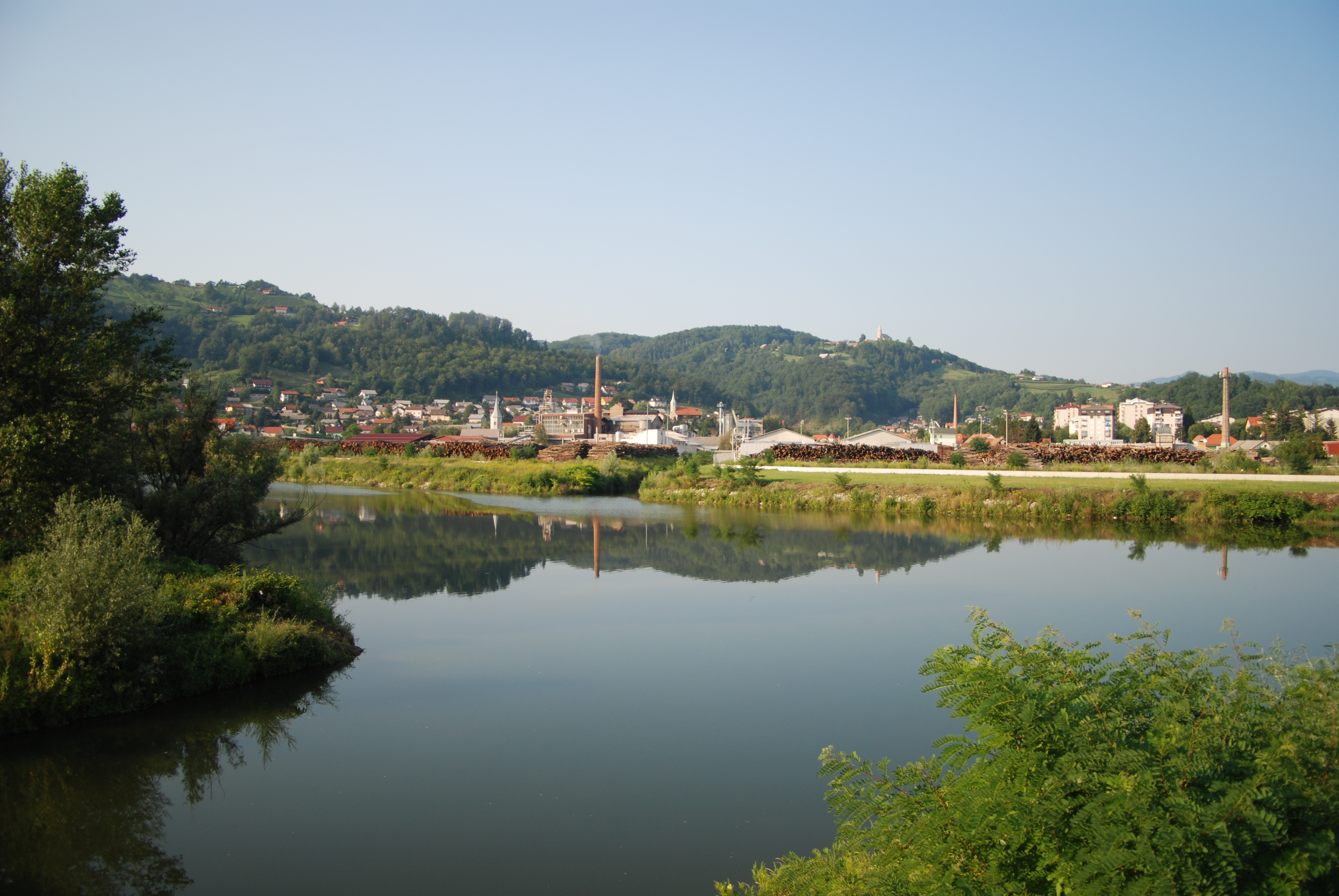
The confluence of the Mirna and the Sava at Sevnica

The Mirna is a river in southeastern Slovenia. The river is a right tributary of the Sava River in the province of Lower Carniola. It is 44 kilometers (27 mi) long, starts below the settlement of Velika Preska, flows through the Mirna Valley and joins the Sava at Dolenji Boštanj, opposite Sevnica.

The largest settlement on the river is the town of Mirna. The river is traversed by the Sevnica–Trebnje Railway. The river was mentioned for the first time in 1028 in relation to a 1016 document by Henry II, Holy Roman Emperor.

Mirna is the river in which the marathon swimmer Martin Strel first learned to swim.

== Name ==
The name Mirna is derived through dissimilation from the verb *nyrati 'to arise from the ground'. This is attested by medieval attestations of the name containing the letter n (e.g., inter fluenta Nirine in 1016).

The upper part of the river is sometimes named Mirnščica or Mirenščica. The expert on Slovene language Ivan Gregorčič and the geographer Maja Topole have characterised the latter form as incorrect.

== See also ==
- List of rivers of Slovenia
