= Krmelj =

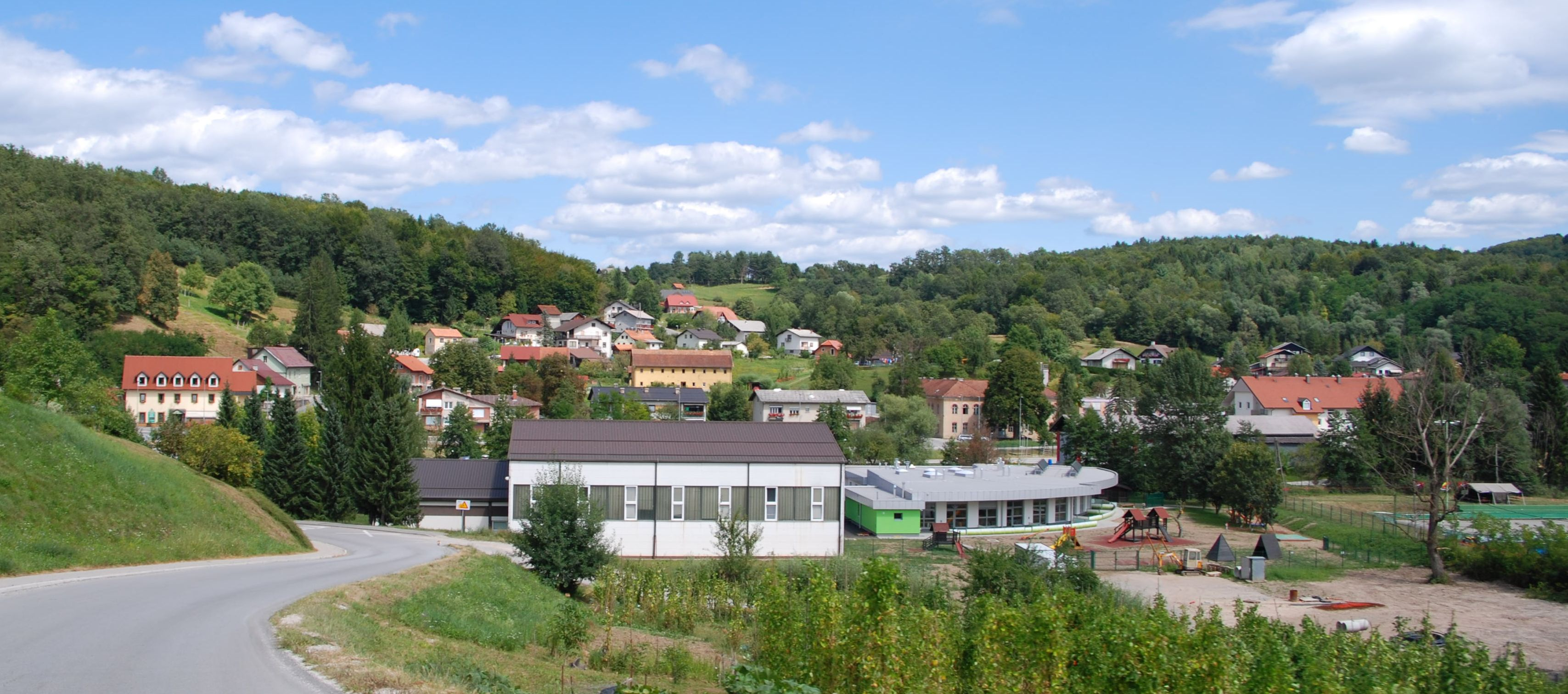
- View of Krmelj from the west

- Location in Slovenia
- Coordinates: 45°58′57.54″N 15°11′20.21″E
- Country: Slovenia
- Traditional region: Lower Carniola
- Statistical region: Lower Sava
- Municipality: Sevnica

Area
  - Total: 2.02 km^{2} (0.78 sq mi)
- Elevation: 247.3 m (811 ft)

Population (2012)
  - Total: 698
  - Density: 343/km^{2} (890/sq mi)

Krmelj (pronounced [kəɾˈmeːl]) is a settlement in the Municipality of Sevnica in central Slovenia. It lies in the valley of Hinje Creek, a left tributary of the Mirna River. The area is part of the historical region of Lower Carniola and is now included in the Lower Sava Statistical Region. The history and the development of Krmelj have been significantly influenced by its brown coal mine.

== Railroad ==
Krmelj has been connected by railroad with Trebnje since 1908 and with Sevnica since 1938. There is a former railway station in Krmelj, now used as the local fire station. It was in use only after the railroad connected Krmelj with Sevnica and was originally named the Šent Janž Railway Station after the formerly larger settlement of Šentjanž. After World War II, Krmelj grew larger than Šentjanž and the railway station was renamed the Krmelj Railway Station. Since 1996, it has been closed to rail service.

== Ponds ==
Two ponds, the remnants of coal mining in the town area, lie in the southern part of the settlement.
