= Jesenice (disambiguation) =

Jesenice is a town in Slovenia.

Jesenice may also refer to:

== Croatia ==
- Jesenice, Croatia, a settlement near Dugi Rat

== Czech Republic ==
- Jesenice (Prague-West District), a town in the Central Bohemian Region
- Jesenice (Příbram District), a municipality and village in the Central Bohemian Region
- Jesenice (Rakovník District), a town in the Central Bohemian Region
- Jesenice, a village and part of Okrouhlá (Cheb District) in the Karlovy Vary Region
- Jesenice, a village and part of Příbram in the Central Bohemian Region
- Velká Jesenice, a municipality and village in the Hradec Králové Region

== Slovenia ==
- Municipality of Jesenice
- Jesenice, Brežice, a village
- Dolenje Jesenice, a village in the Municipality of Šentrupert
- Gorenje Jesenice, a village in the Municipality of Šentrupert

== See also ==
- Jasenice (disambiguation)
