= Prelesje =

Prelesje is the name of several settlements in Slovenia:

- Prelesje, Črnomelj, a settlement in the Municipality of Črnomelj
- Prelesje, Gorenja Vas–Poljane, a settlement in the Municipality of Gorenja Vas–Poljane
- Prelesje, Litija, a settlement in the Municipality of Litija
- Prelesje, Šentrupert, a settlement in the Municipality of Šentrupert

== See also ==
- Prilesje (disambiguation)
- Lesje
