= Trstenik =

Trstenik is a South Slavic place name originating from the word trska which means reed. It may refer to:

== Croatia ==
- Trstenik, Dubrovnik-Neretva County, a village in the Orebić municipality, Croatia
- Trstenik (island), a small island near Korčula, Croatia
- Trstenik, Istria County, a hamlet in the Lanišće municipality, Croatia
- Trstenik, Split, a neighbourhood of the city of Split, Croatia
- Trstenik, Zagreb County, a village in the Marija Gorica municipality, Croatia
- Trstenik Nartski, a village near Rugvica, Zagreb County, Croatia

== Greece ==
- Tristeno, before 1927: Drestenikon, a village in Zagori municipality, Greece

== North Macedonia ==
- Trstenik (Rosoman), a village in Rosoman Municipality
- Trstenik, Sveti Nikole, a village in Sveti Nikole Municipality

== Serbia ==
- Trstenik, Serbia, a town in Serbia
- FK Trstenik, football club from the town of Trstenik, plays in Serbian League East
- Stari Trstenik, a village near the town of Trstenik

== Slovenia ==
- Trstenik, Benedikt, a village in the Municipality of Benedikt, northeastern Slovenia
- Trstenik, Kranj, a village in the Urban Municipality of Kranj, northwestern Slovenia
- Trstenik, Ormož, a village in the Municipality of Ormož, northeastern Slovenia
- Trstenik, Šentrupert, a settlement in the Municipality of Šentrupert, southeastern Slovenia

== See also ==
- Trastenik, a town in Bulgaria
- Trastenik (village), a village in Bulgaria
- Trestenik, a village in the municipality of Peja, Kosovo
- Tërstenik (disambiguation)
- Trstenik Airport, also known as "Odžaci", is an airport in Serbia, 2.5 km from the town of Trstenik and 12 km from the spa of Vrnjačka Banja
