= Veliki Cirnik =

- Location in Slovenia
- Coordinates: 45°59′39.26″N 15°8′24.69″E
- Country: Slovenia
- Traditional region: Styria
- Statistical region: Lower Sava
- Municipality: Sevnica

Area
  - Total: 2.3 km^{2} (0.89 sq mi)
- Elevation: 399 m (1,309 ft)

Population (2002)
  - Total: 77

Veliki Cirnik (pronounced [ˈʋeːliki ˈtsiːɾnik]; German: Großzirnik) is a village in the Municipality of Sevnica in east-central Slovenia. It lies southwest of Šentjanž in the historical region of Styria. The municipality is now included in the Lower Sava Statistical Region.

== Name ==
The name Veliki Cirnik literally means 'big Cirnik', distinguishing the village from neighboring Mali Cirnik pri Šentjanžu (literally, 'little Cirnik near Šentjanž'). The name Cirnik is derived from the Slovene common noun cer 'Turkey oak', thus referring to the local vegetation.

== Church ==
The local church is dedicated to the Feast of the Cross and belongs to the Parish of Šentrupert. It dates to the late 16th or early 17th century.
