= Pilgrims' Trail (Slovenia) =

Trail in southern Slovenia

Coordinates: 45°56′29.37″N 15°8′16.21″E

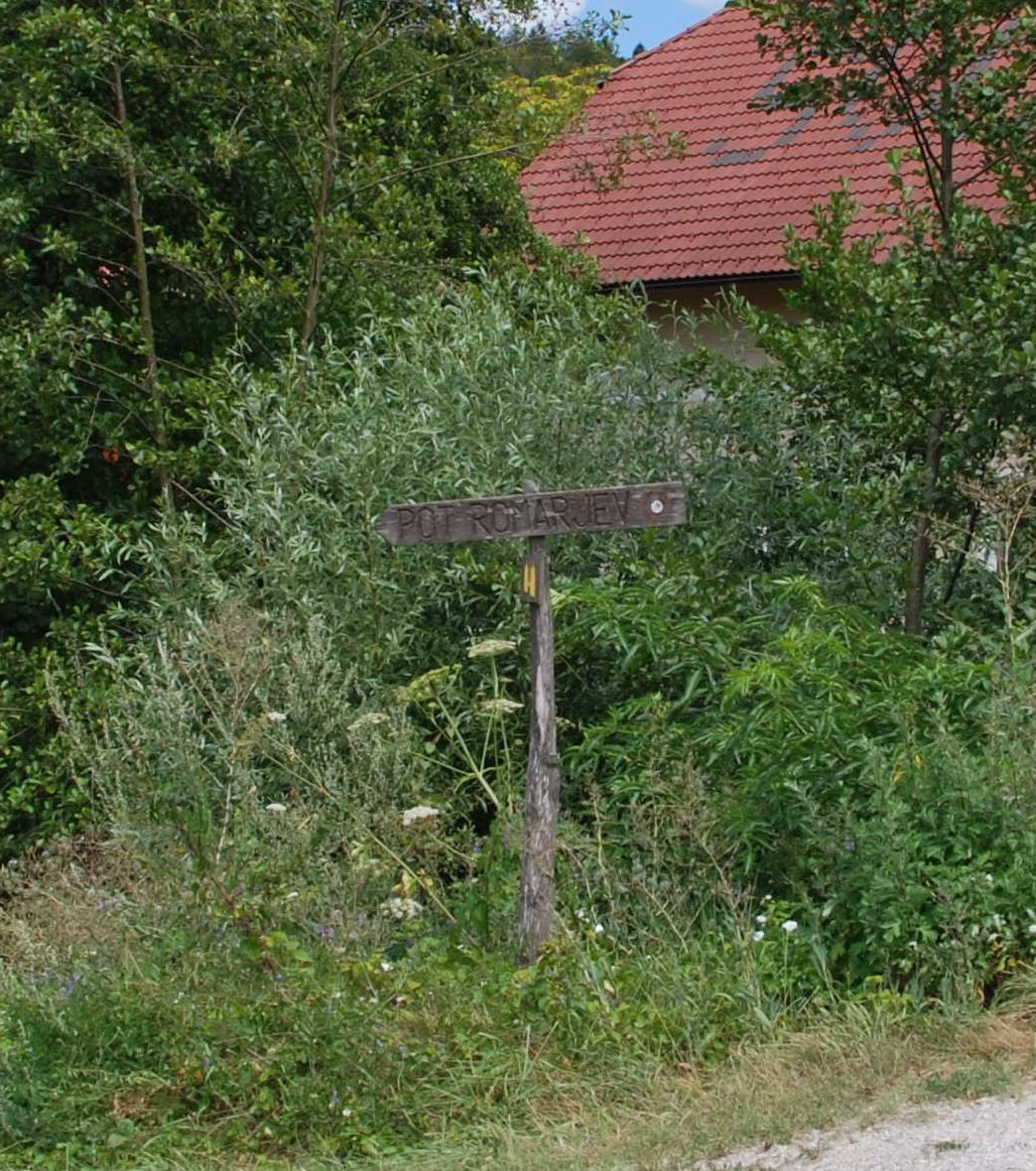
The fingerpost of the Pilgrims' Trail in the village of Hrastovica

The Pilgrims' Trail (Slovene: Pot romarjev) is a 28-kilometre-long (17 mi) trail in southeastern Slovenia. It runs from Mount Sorrow (Žalostna gora) above Mokronog through Šentrupert, past the Church of St. Francis Xavier in Vesela Gora ("Mount Joy"), and to the Zaplaz Pilgrimage Church in Čatež. The entire walk takes 6 to 7 hours. An organised pilgrimage takes place on the trail every year on the second Sunday of May. The path is maintained by the mountaineering club from Šentrupert, whereas the event is organised by the cultural society of Šentrupert.
