= Škrilj, Semič =

Škrilj
- Location in Slovenia
- Coordinates: 45°38′9.53″N 15°6′42.15″E
- Country: Slovenia
- Traditional region: Lower Carniola
- Statistical region: Southeast Slovenia
- Municipality: Semič
- Elevation: 876.3 m (2,875 ft)

Population (2002)
  - Total: none

Škrilj (pronounced [ˈʃkɾiːl]; German: Skrill) is a remote former settlement in the Municipality of Semič in southern Slovenia. The area is part of the traditional region of Lower Carniola and is now included in the Southeast Slovenia Statistical Region. Its territory is now part of the village of Planina.

== Name ==
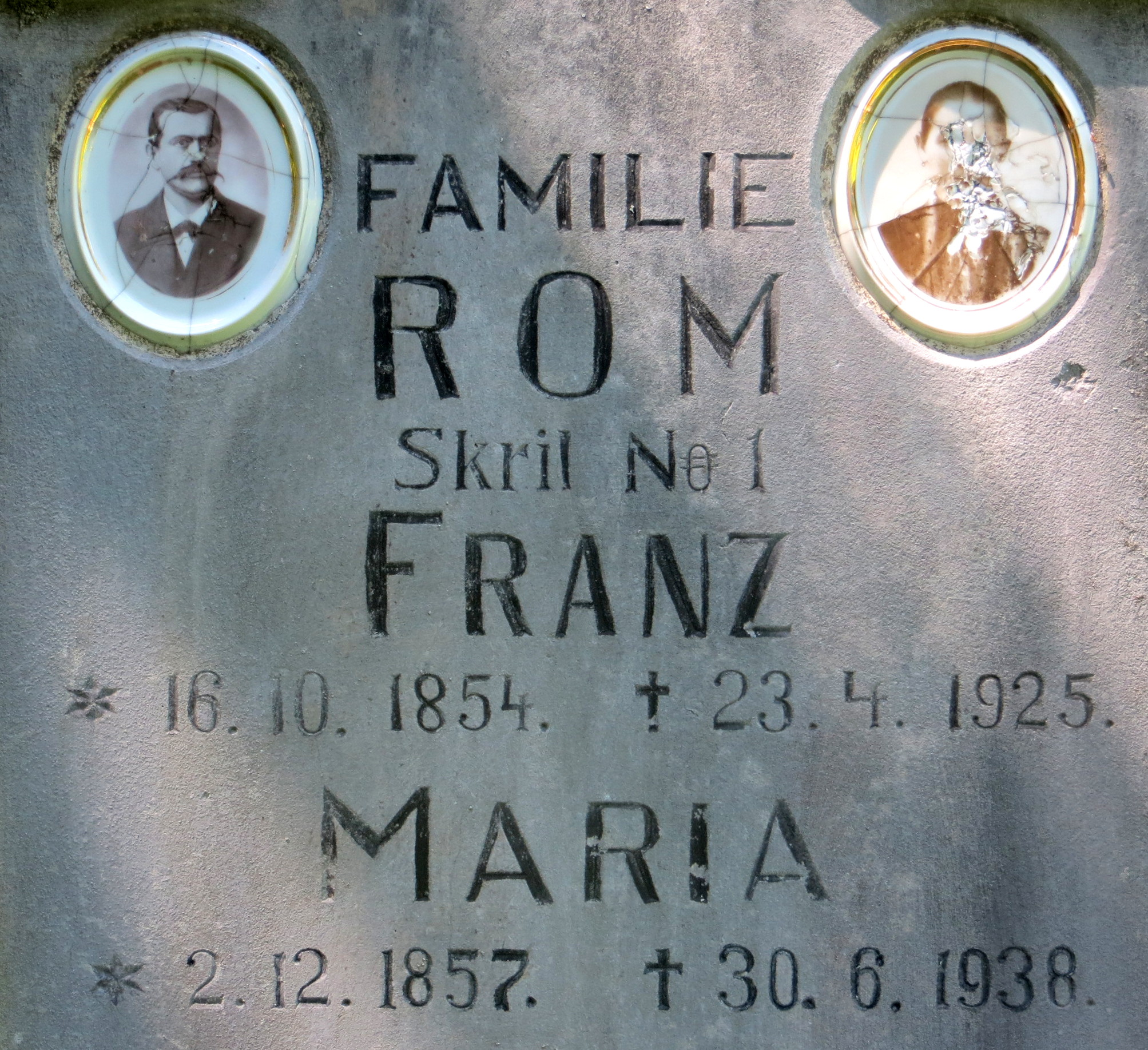
Gottschee German gravestone with the toponym Skril

The name Škrilj comes from the dialect word škril, corresponding to standard Slovene skril 'slate', referring to the local lithology. Similar place names with the same root include Škrilje, Skrilje, Škrljevo, and Škrlovica.

== History ==
Škrilj was a Gottschee German village. In 1931 the village had six houses. The original residents were expelled in the fall of 1941. Italian troops burned the village during the Rog Offensive in the summer of 1942 and it was not rebuilt after the war.
