= Jasenice =

Jasenice may refer to:

== Bosnia and Herzegovina ==
- Jasenica (Neretva), river in Mostarsko Polje, and the right tributary of the Neretva.

== Croatia ==
- Jasenice, Zadar County, a village and municipality near Zadar, Croatia
- Jasenice, Dubrovnik-Neretva County, village in Konavle, Croatia
- Jasenice (Třebíč District), a village and municipality in the Czech Republic

== See also ==
- Jesenice (disambiguation)
