= Škrljevo Castle =

Coordinates: 45.9780°N 15.0755°E

- Grad Škrljevo; Grailach
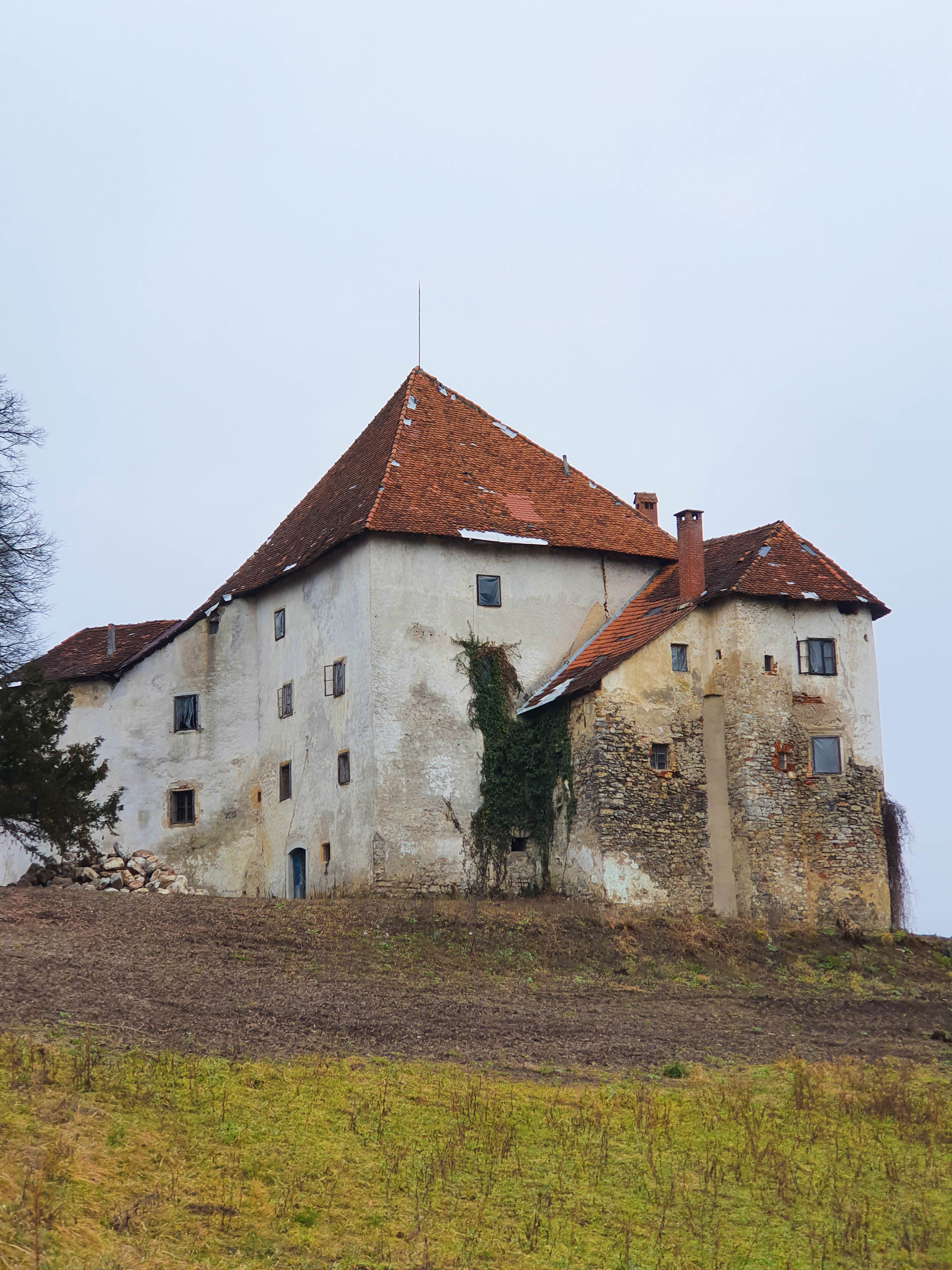
- Interactive map of the Škrljevo Castle area

General information
- Location: Škrljevo, Municipality of Šentrupert, Slovenia
- Completed: around 1020

Škrljevo Castle (Slovenian: Grad Škrljevo german: Grailach) is a castle in Carniola, in what became the municipality of Šentrupert, Slovenia.

== History ==
The first surviving mention of the castle dates to 1043. Valvasor attributed the castle’s founding to St. Hemma.

The Jesuit Bautscher, a contemporary of Valvasor, left a message in Latin, which placed St. Hemma, among other goods, also brought the Grailach rule into the marriage: "[...] dotem attulit comitatum Peilnstein, castra Vizel, Landsberg, Weitenstein, Andernacum, Nassenfues, Grailach, Erkhenstein, ac alia praedia in Carniola sita [...]. "

According to Hemma's donation (1043), these goods belonged to the Benedictine monastery she founded on the Gurk in Carinthia until 1072 and then to the Gurk diocese, which the Grailach lordship gave it as a 17th century fief.

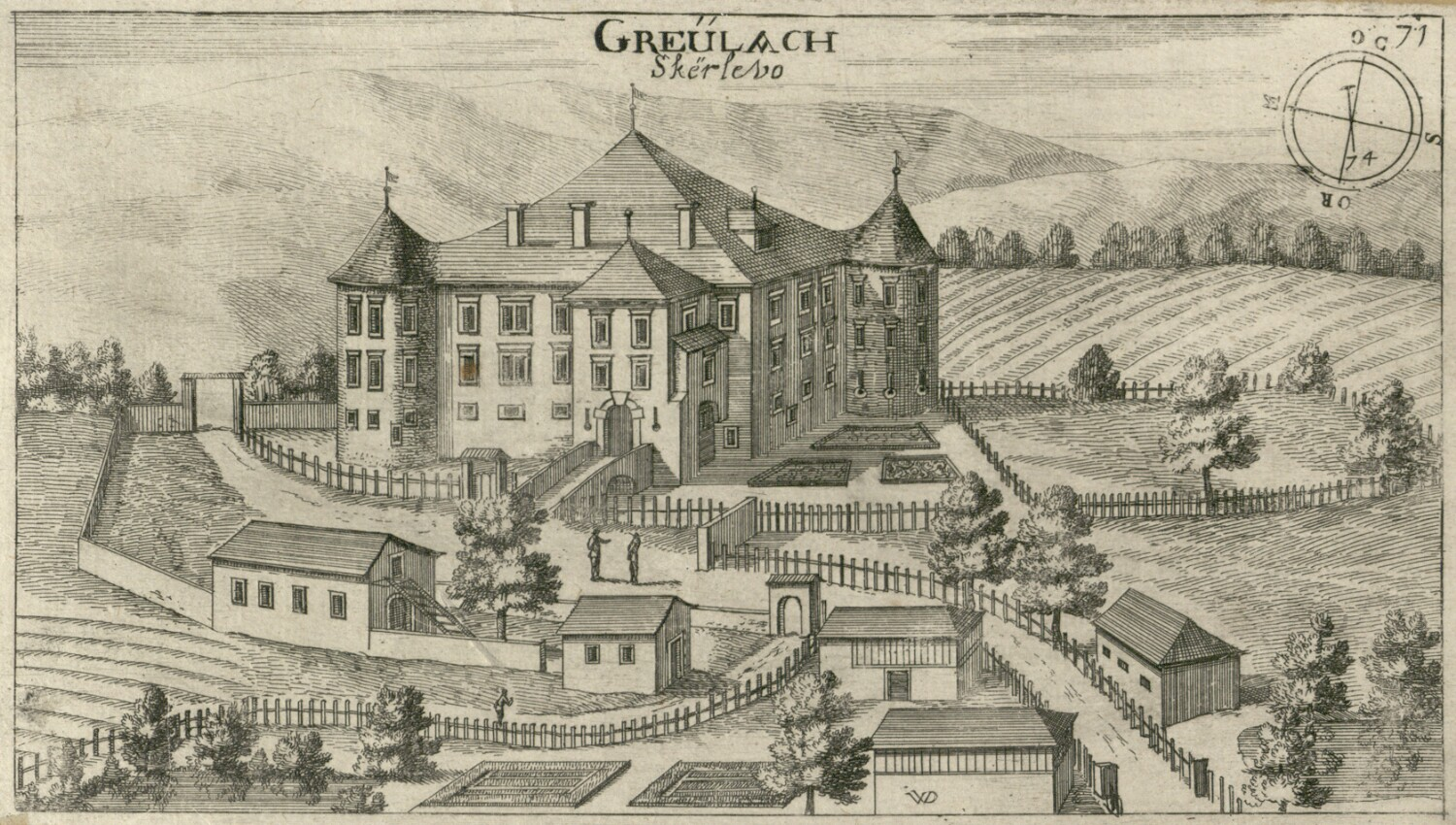
Škrljevo Castle 1679 by Valvasor

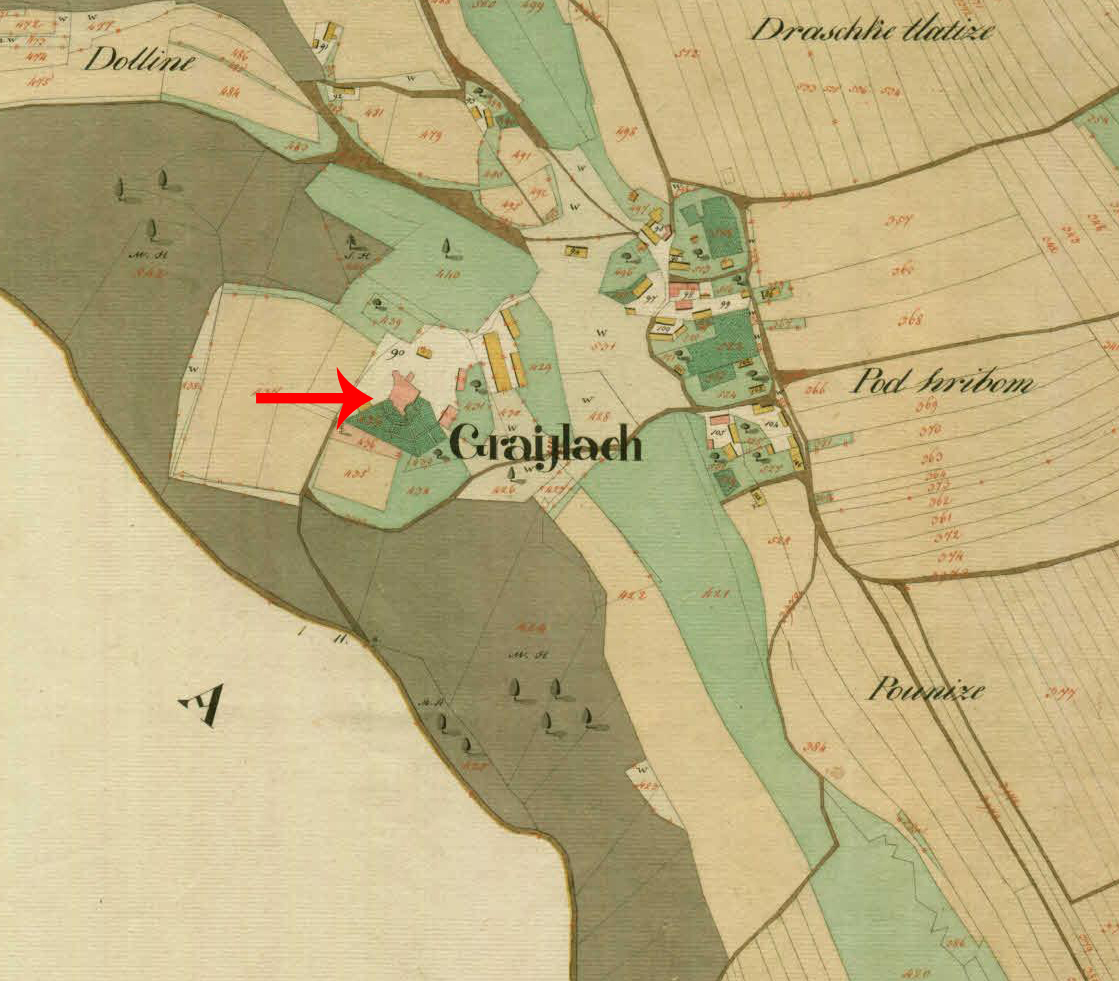
Škrljevo Castle on a Franciscan Cadastre 1823-1869

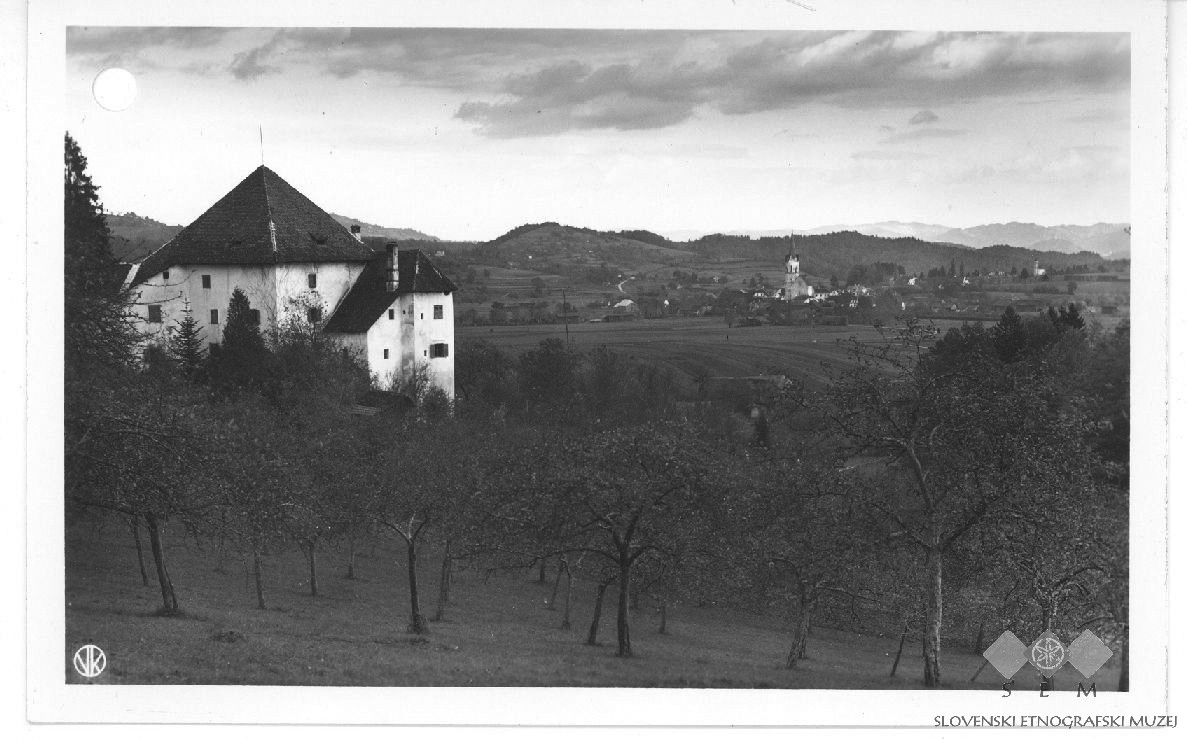
The castle between 1928 and 1947

In the 1043 document, it was mentioned as Chrilouva. As an estate, Škrljevo was first mentioned in 1130 as the predium Chrilowe. From 1072 until the 17th century, the castle hosted the head of the Krka diocese.

The castle was originally built as a towering court. Its estate was later granted to Count William II, Breže-Selško, and after his death his wife Hemma of Gurk donated the property to the Krško diocese. The court was first written about indirectly in 1163, when a document mentions the knight of Škrljevo and the minister of Aquileia, Majnhard Škrljevski (purchrauiis Megnardo de Crilog). The direct connection with Hemma of Gurk, whom Valvasor claimed owned the castle in the 10th century, remains unexplored.

In 1541, Škrljevo Castle came into the possession of the Auerspergs and in 1585 a document appeared which named Janez Baltazar Wernegk as the owner.

== Design ==
The castle is Romanesque in its core, It was extended in the Renaissance and became a fortified mansion. Later in the Gothic period it was partially rebuilt. In the Baroque period —a façade was added, which is still visible today.

== Owners ==
No information about the owners of the castle and the Grailach rule was known until the middle of the 16th century.

The earliest known rulers were brothers Adam and Sigismund von Auersperg, mentioned in 1541. They were followed by Johann Balthasar von Werneck in 1585, and then by Rudolph Count Barbo von Wachsenstein until 1613, succeeded briefly by Ruess von Ruessenstein. Martin Khaysell became the owner from 1613 to 1705, followed by the Barons von Langenmantel until 1785. Ownership then passed to the Barons von Pittoni (1785–1799), the Schuller family (1799–1834), and Karl Vasič (1834–1885), who managed the estate for the Auersperg family, before it passed to Podobnik in 1885.

== Tumulus ==
In the forest west of Škrljevo Castle, tumulus from the Early Iron Age with diameters of 15 m and 12 m and heights of 2 m and 1.5 m were discovered. A smaller burial is visible to the northwest of the smaller mound. Both were excavated in 1905 by J. Pečnik.
