= Draga pri Šentrupertu =

- Location in Slovenia
- Coordinates: 45°59′10.65″N 15°4′38.78″E
- Country: Slovenia
- Traditional region: Lower Carniola
- Statistical region: Southeast Slovenia
- Municipality: Šentrupert

Area
  - Total: 2.25 km^{2} (0.87 sq mi)
- Elevation: 323.7 m (1,062 ft)

Population (2002)
  - Total: 98

Draga pri Šentrupertu (pronounced [ˈdɾaːɡa pɾi ʃɛnˈtɾuːpɛɾtu] or [ˈdɾaːɡa pɾi ʃənˈtɾuːpɛɾtu]) is a village northwest of Šentrupert in southeastern Slovenia. The area is part of the historical region of Lower Carniola. The Municipality of Šentrupert is now included in the Southeast Slovenia Statistical Region.

== Name ==
The name of the settlement was changed from Draga to Draga pri Šentrupertu (literally, 'Draga near Šentrupert') in 1953. The name Draga is derived from the Slovene common noun draga 'small, narrow valley', referring to the geographical location of the settlement.
