= Kamnje, Šentrupert =

Kamnje
- Location in Slovenia
- Coordinates: 45°59′2.51″N 15°5′38.25″E
- Country: Slovenia
- Traditional region: Lower Carniola
- Statistical region: Southeast Slovenia
- Municipality: Šentrupert

Area
  - Total: 1.01 km^{2} (0.39 sq mi)
- Elevation: 303.8 m (997 ft)

Population (2002)
  - Total: 94

Kamnje (pronounced [ˈkaːmnjɛ]) is a settlement just north of Šentrupert in southeastern Slovenia. The area is part of the historical region of Lower Carniola. The Municipality of Šentrupert is now included in the Southeast Slovenia Statistical Region.
