= Ravnik =

Ravnik may refer to:

== Places ==
In Croatia:

- Ravnik (island), an Adriatic island

In Romania:

- Rafnic (Croatian: Ravnik), a village in the commune of Lupac

In Slovenia:

- Nanos, Vipava, a settlement in the Municipality of Vipava (known as Ravnik until 1955)
- Ravnik, Bloke, a settlement in the Municipality of Bloke
- Ravnik, Šentrupert, a settlement in the Municipality of Šentrupert
- Ravnik pri Hotedršici, a settlement in the Municipality of Logatec

== People ==
- Janko Ravnik, Slovenian composer
