= Roženberk =

- Location in Slovenia
- Coordinates: 45°58′41.98″N 15°7′42.72″E
- Country: Slovenia
- Traditional region: Lower Carniola
- Statistical region: Southeast Slovenia
- Municipality: Šentrupert

Area
  - Total: 0.67 km^{2} (0.26 sq mi)
- Elevation: 292.1 m (958 ft)

Population (2002)
  - Total: 24

Roženberk (pronounced [ˈɾoːʒənbɛɾk]; in older sources also Rosenberg) is a small settlement north of Dolenje Jesenice in the Municipality of Šentrupert in southeastern Slovenia. The area is part of the historical region of Lower Carniola. The municipality is now included in the Southeast Slovenia Statistical Region.
