= Zabukovje =

Zabukovje is a Slovene place name that may refer to:

- Zabukovje nad Sevnico, a village in the Municipality of Sevnica, southeastern Slovenia
- Zabukovje pri Raki, a village in the Municipality of Krško, eastern Slovenia
- Zabukovje, Kranj, a village in the Municipality of Kranj, northwestern Slovenia
- Zabukovje, Šentrupert, a village in the Municipality of Šentrupert, southeastern Slovenia
- Zabukovje, Vojnik, a village in the Municipality of Vojnik, eastern Slovenia
