= Škrljevo, Šentrupert =

Škrljevo
- Location in Slovenia
- Coordinates: 45°58′41.17″N 15°4′41.53″E
- Country: Slovenia
- Traditional region: Lower Carniola
- Statistical region: Southeast Slovenia
- Municipality: Šentrupert

Area
  - Total: 1.14 km^{2} (0.44 sq mi)
- Elevation: 275.1 m (903 ft)

Population (2002)
  - Total: 82

Škrljevo (pronounced [ʃkəɾˈljeːʋɔ]) is a settlement just west of Šentrupert in southeastern Slovenia. The area is part of the historical region of Lower Carniola and is now included in the Southeast Slovenia Statistical Region. It includes the hamlet of Češnjice (German: Kerschdorf).

Škrljevo Castle (German: Grailach) is a castle on the western edge of the settlement. It was first mentioned in written documents dating to 1044. The current building dates to the 15th and 17th centuries with some 19th-century rebuilding.
