= Ravne nad Šentrupertom =

- Location in Slovenia
- Coordinates: 46°0′44.93″N 15°4′17.07″E
- Country: Slovenia
- Traditional region: Lower Carniola
- Statistical region: Southeast Slovenia
- Municipality: Šentrupert

Area
  - Total: 3.22 km^{2} (1.24 sq mi)
- Elevation: 535 m (1,755 ft)

Population (2002)
  - Total: 42

Ravne nad Šentrupertom (pronounced [ˈɾáːwnɛ nat ʃɛnˈtɾúːpɛɾtɔm, - ʃənˈ-]) is a small settlement in the hills north of Šentrupert in the Lower Carniola region of southeastern Slovenia. The entire Municipality of Šentrupert is included in the Southeast Slovenia Statistical Region.

== Name ==
The name of the settlement was changed from Ravne to Ravne nad Šentrupertom in 1953.
