= Priles =

Priles may refer to:

- Príles, a section of Trenčianska Teplá, Slovakia
- Priles, Croatia, a village near Sveti Đurđ, Croatia

== See also ==
- Prilesje (disambiguation)
