= Hrastno =

- Location in Slovenia
- Coordinates: 45°59′23.48″N 15°7′6.58″E
- Country: Slovenia
- Traditional region: Lower Carniola
- Statistical region: Southeast Slovenia
- Municipality: Šentrupert

Area
  - Total: 3.65 km^{2} (1.41 sq mi)
- Elevation: 421.4 m (1,383 ft)

Population (2002)
  - Total: 56

Hrastno (pronounced [ˈxɾaːstnɔ]) is a settlement in the hills northeast of Šentrupert in the historical region of Lower Carniola in southeastern Slovenia. The Municipality of Šentrupert is now included in the Southeast Slovenia Statistical Region.
