= Mali Cirnik pri Šentjanžu =

- Location in Slovenia
- Coordinates: 45°59′14.6″N 15°8′58.08″E
- Country: Slovenia
- Traditional region: Lower Carniola
- Statistical region: Southeast Slovenia
- Municipality: Šentrupert

Area
  - Total: 2.82 km^{2} (1.09 sq mi)
- Elevation: 375.2 m (1,231 ft)

Population (2002)
  - Total: 62

Mali Cirnik pri Šentjanžu (pronounced [ˈmaːli ˈtsiːɾnik pɾi ʃɛnˈtjaːnʒu] or [ˈmaːli ˈtsiːɾnik pɾi ʃənˈtjaːnʒu]; German: Kleinzirnik) is a village in the Municipality of Šentrupert in southeastern Slovenia. It lies in the hills east of Šentrupert just off the road towards Šentjanž in the historical region of Lower Carniola. The municipality is now included in the Southeast Slovenia Statistical Region. The settlement includes the hamlets of Stražberk (in older sources also Stražberg, German: Straßberg), Vrhe, and Selo.

== Name ==
The name of the settlement was changed from Mali Cirnik to Mali Cirnik pri Šentjanžu in 1955. The name Mali Cirnik pri Šentjanžu literally means 'little Cirnik near Šentjanž', distinguishing the village from neighboring Veliki Cirnik (literally, 'big Cirnik'). The name Cirnik is derived from the Slovene common noun cer 'Turkey oak', thus referring to the local vegetation. In the past the German name was Kleinzirnik.
