= Okrog =

Okrog is a Slovene place name that may refer to:

- Okrog, Litija, a village in the Municipality of Litija, central Slovenia
- Okrog, Šentjur, a village in the Municipality of Šentjur, eastern Slovenia
- Okrog, Šentrupert, a village in the Municipality of Šentrupert, southeastern Slovenia
- Okrog pri Motniku, a village in the Municipality of Kamnik, northern Slovenia
