= Vrh, Šentrupert =

Vrh
- Location in Slovenia
- Coordinates: 45°58′49.52″N 15°6′10.28″E
- Country: Slovenia
- Traditional region: Lower Carniola
- Statistical region: Southeast Slovenia
- Municipality: Šentrupert

Area
  - Total: 2.29 km^{2} (0.88 sq mi)
- Elevation: 309.7 m (1,016 ft)

Population (2002)
  - Total: 30

Vrh (pronounced [ˈʋəɾx]) is a settlement east of Šentrupert in the historical region of Lower Carniola in southeastern Slovenia. The Municipality of Šentrupert is now included in the Southeast Slovenia Statistical Region.
