= Prilesje =

Prilesje may refer to:

- Prilesje, Zagreb County, a village near Vrbovec, Croatia
- Prilesje, Velike Lašče, a village in central Slovenia
- Prilesje, Lukovica, a village in central Slovenia
- Prilesje pri Plavah, a village in western Slovenia
- Prilesje, Zagreb, a street running along the western edge of Maksimir Park

== See also ==
- Prilesye
- Priles (disambiguation)
- Prelesje (disambiguation)
