= Straža, Šentrupert =

Straža
- Location in Slovenia
- Coordinates: 45°57′55.83″N 15°4′41″E
- Country: Slovenia
- Traditional region: Lower Carniola
- Statistical region: Southeast Slovenia
- Municipality: Šentrupert

Area
  - Total: 1.28 km^{2} (0.49 sq mi)
- Elevation: 257 m (843 ft)

Population (2002)
  - Total: 122

Straža (pronounced [ˈstɾaːʒa]; German: Strascha) is a settlement in the Municipality of Šentrupert in southeastern Slovenia. It lies on the road from Šentrupert towards Mirna in the historical region of Lower Carniola. The municipality is now included in the Southeast Slovenia Statistical Region. The settlement includes the hamlets of Kurja Dolina (Slovene: Kurja dolina), Grilov Hrib (Slovene: Grilov hrib), and Praproče.
