= Brinje, Šentrupert =

Brinje
- Location in Slovenia
- Coordinates: 45°58′8.76″N 15°5′12.6″E
- Country: Slovenia
- Traditional region: Lower Carniola
- Statistical region: Southeast Slovenia
- Municipality: Šentrupert

Area
  - Total: 0.89 km^{2} (0.34 sq mi)
- Elevation: 261 m (856 ft)

Population (2002)
  - Total: 70

Brinje (pronounced [ˈbɾiːnjɛ]) is a settlement south of Šentrupert in the historical region of Lower Carniola in southeastern Slovenia. The Municipality of Šentrupert is now included in the Southeast Slovenia Statistical Region.
