= Tërstenik =

Tërstenik may refer to:

- Tërstenik, Drenas, a village in the municipality of Drenas, Kosovo
- Tërstenik, Viti, a village in the municipality of Viti, Kosovo

== See also ==
- Trestenik, a village in the municipality of Peja, Kosovo
- Trstenik (disambiguation)
