= Vesela Gora =

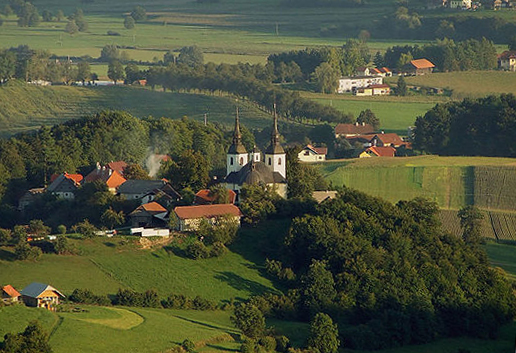

- Location in Slovenia
- Coordinates: 45°58′12.34″N 15°4′46.6″E
- Country: Slovenia
- Traditional region: Lower Carniola
- Statistical region: Southeast Slovenia
- Municipality: Šentrupert

Area
  - Total: 0.32 km^{2} (0.12 sq mi)
- Elevation: 310.6 m (1,019 ft)

Population (2015)
  - Total: 59

Vesela Gora (pronounced [ʋɛˈseːla ˈɡɔːɾa]) is a small settlement in the Municipality of Šentrupert in southeastern Slovenia. The area is part of the historical region of Lower Carniola. The municipality is now included in the Southeast Slovenia Statistical Region.

== History ==
Vesela Gora was established in 1992, when its territory was separated from Brinje and it was made a settlement in its own right.

== Church ==
The pilgrimage church in the settlement is dedicated to Saint Francis Xavier and belongs to the Parish of Šentrupert. It was built from 1723 to 1735 and has two belfries.
