= Hom, Šentrupert =

Hom
- Location in Slovenia
- Coordinates: 45°59′37.49″N 15°5′44.81″E
- Country: Slovenia
- Traditional region: Lower Carniola
- Statistical region: Southeast Slovenia
- Municipality: Šentrupert

Area
  - Total: 5.43 km^{2} (2.10 sq mi)
- Elevation: 423.4 m (1,389 ft)

Population (2002)
  - Total: 87

Hom (pronounced [ˈxoːm]) is a dispersed settlement in the Municipality of Šentrupert in southeastern Slovenia. The area is part of the historical region of Lower Carniola. The municipality is now included in the Southeast Slovenia Statistical Region.

The local church is dedicated to the Holy Spirit (Slovene: Sveti Duh) and belongs to the Parish of Šentrupert. It is a Romanesque building with remains of 16th-century frescos.
