= Ravnik, Šentrupert =

Ravnik
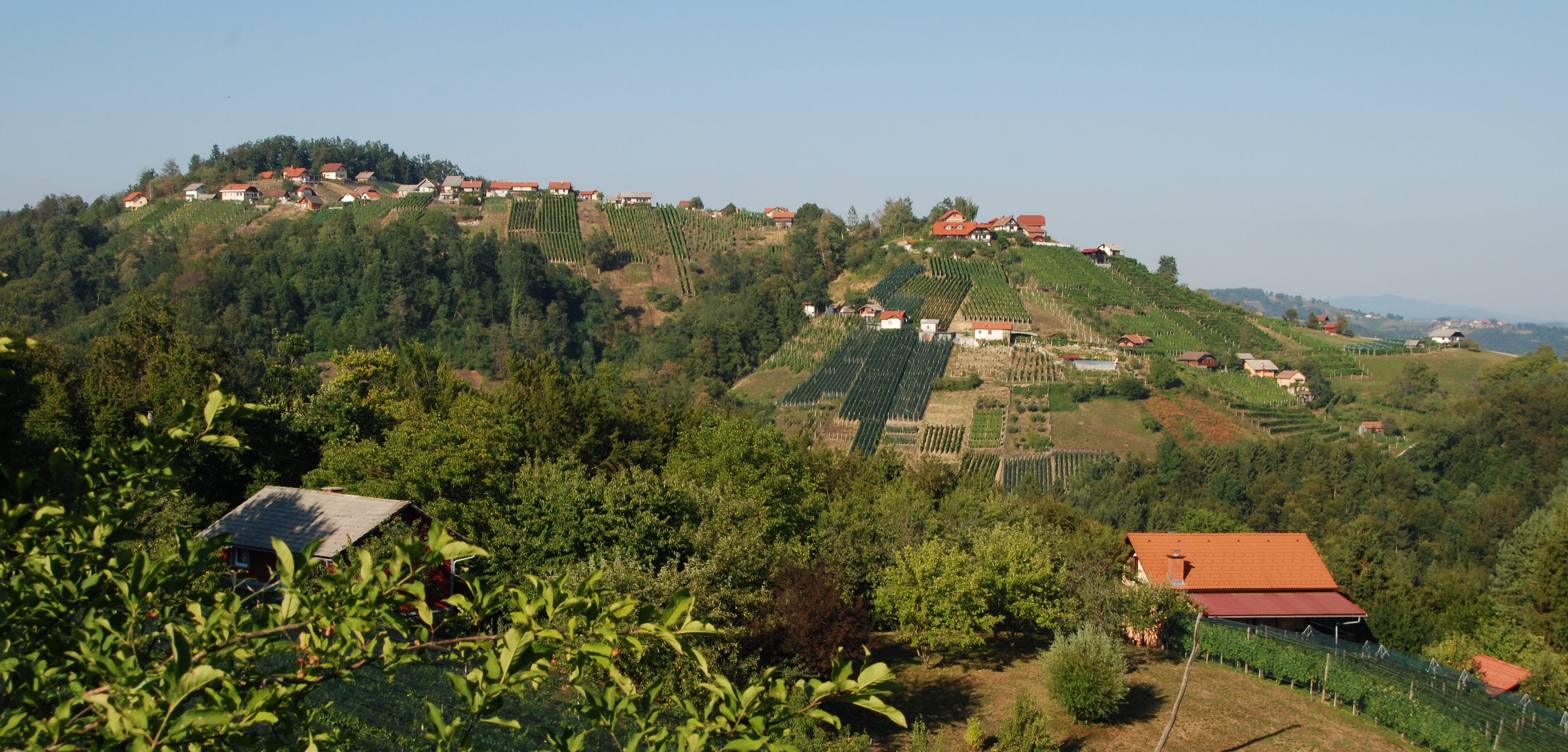

- Location in Slovenia
- Coordinates: 45°58′33.12″N 15°3′29.04″E
- Country: Slovenia
- Traditional region: Lower Carniola
- Statistical region: Southeast Slovenia
- Municipality: Šentrupert

Area
  - Total: 2.15 km^{2} (0.83 sq mi)
- Elevation: 368.3 m (1,208 ft)

Population (2002)
  - Total: 77

Ravnik (pronounced [ˈɾaːu̯nik]) is a dispersed settlement in the hills west of Šentrupert in the historical region of Lower Carniola in Slovenia. The Municipality of Šentrupert is now included in the Southeast Slovenia Statistical Region.
