= Kostanjevica, Šentrupert =

Kostanjevica
- Location in Slovenia
- Coordinates: 46°0′56.86″N 15°5′29.14″E
- Country: Slovenia
- Traditional region: Lower Carniola
- Statistical region: Southeast Slovenia
- Municipality: Šentrupert

Area
  - Total: 2.39 km^{2} (0.92 sq mi)
- Elevation: 528.8 m (1,735 ft)

Population (2002)
  - Total: 39

Kostanjevica (pronounced [kɔˈstaːnjɛʋitsa]) is a village in the Municipality of Šentrupert in southeastern Slovenia. It is a dispersed settlement in the hills north of Šentrupert in the historical region of Lower Carniola. The municipality is now included in the Southeast Slovenia Statistical Region.
