= Zaloka =

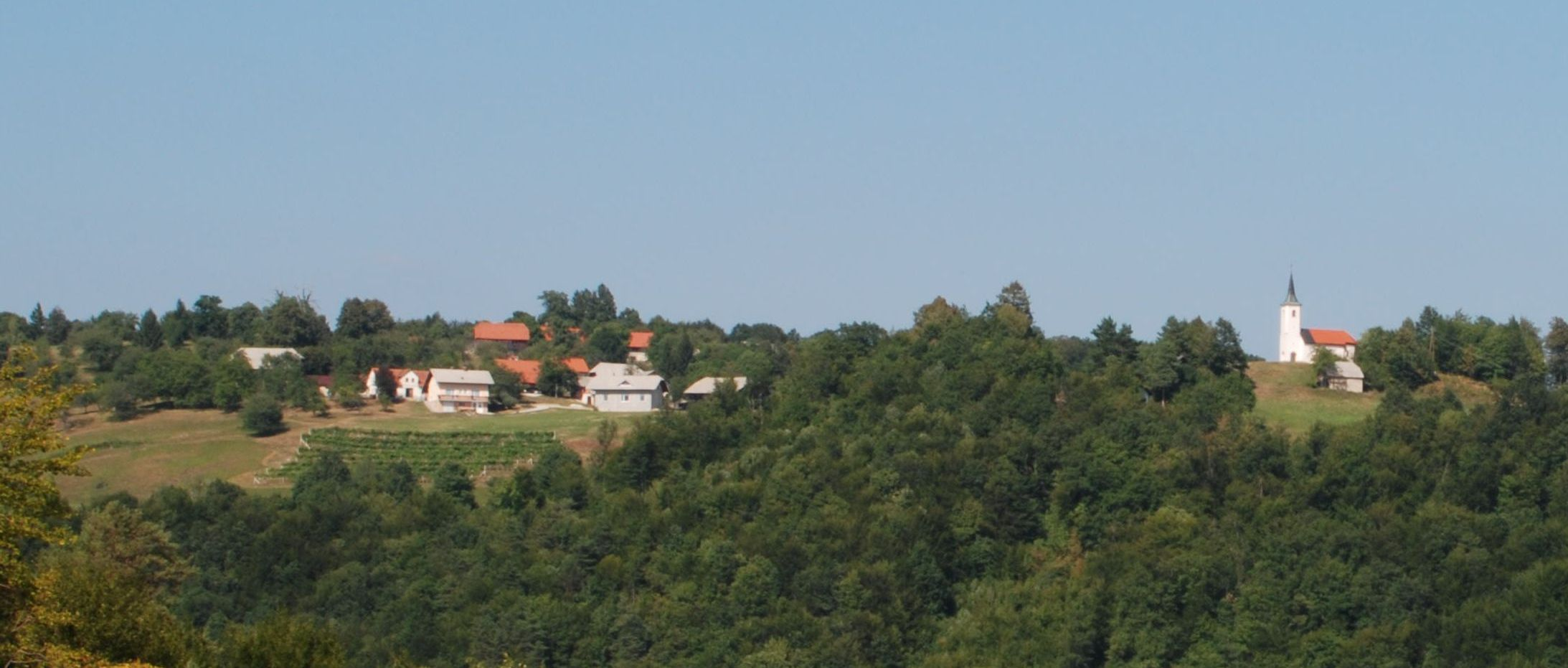
- The village of Zaloka, with St. Agnes's Church

- Location in Slovenia
- Coordinates: 45°59′48.3″N 15°2′18.01″E
- Country: Slovenia
- Traditional region: Lower Carniola
- Statistical region: Southeast Slovenia
- Municipality: Šentrupert

Area
  - Total: 2.96 km^{2} (1.14 sq mi)
- Elevation: 544.6 m (1,787 ft)

Population (2012)
  - Total: 44
  - Density: 15/km^{2} (39/sq mi)

Zaloka (pronounced [ˈzaːlɔka]) is a village in the Municipality of Šentrupert in southeastern Slovenia. The area is part of the historical region of Lower Carniola. The municipality is now included in the Southeast Slovenia Statistical Region.

The local church is dedicated to Saint Agnes (Slovene: sveta Neža) and belongs to the Parish of Šentrupert. It dates to the 16th century.
