= Podbočje =

Podbočje Sveti Križ pri Kostanjevici (until 1952)
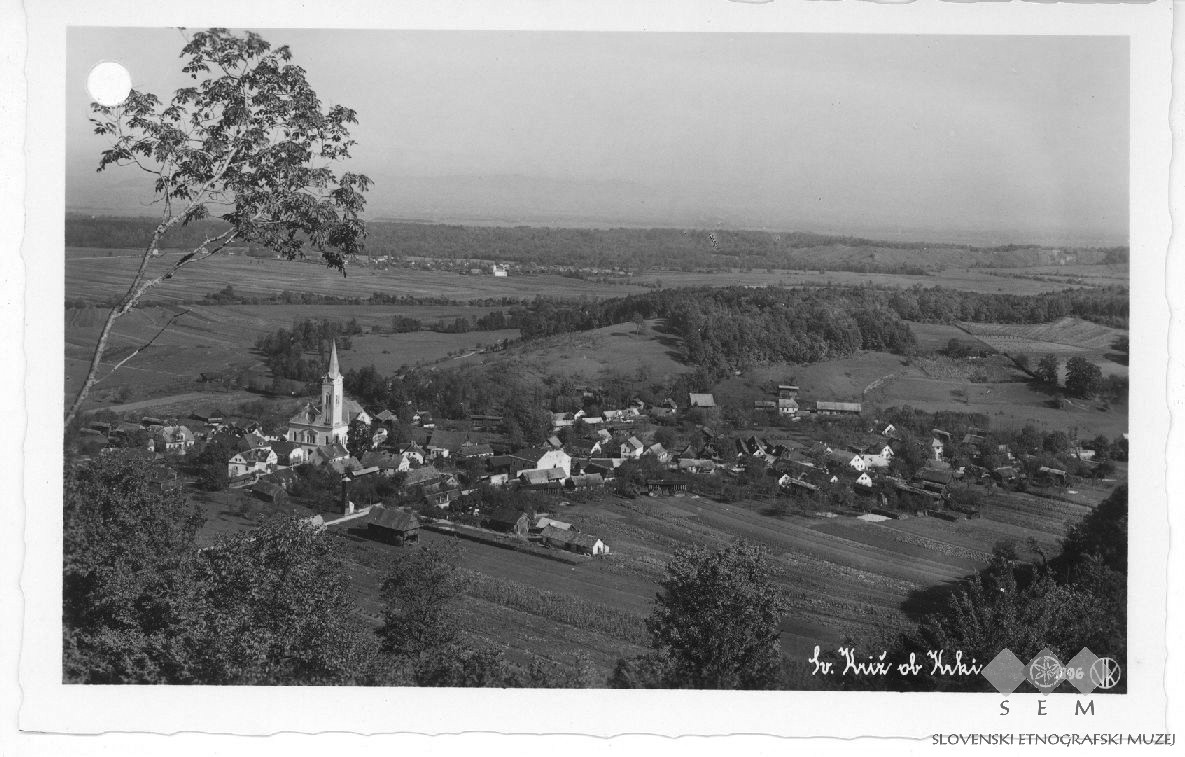
- Postcard of Podbočje

- Location in Slovenia
- Coordinates: 45°51′56.04″N 15°27′46.61″E
- Country: Slovenia
- Traditional region: Lower Carniola
- Statistical region: Lower Sava
- Municipality: Krško

Area
  - Total: 1.46 km^{2} (0.56 sq mi)
- Elevation: 153.2 m (503 ft)

Population (2002)
  - Total: 336
- Postal code: 8312

Podbočje (pronounced [pɔdˈbóːtʃjɛ]; German: Heiligenkreuz) is a village on the right bank of the Krka River in the foothills of the Gorjanci range in the Municipality of Krško in eastern Slovenia. The area is part of the traditional region of Lower Carniola. It is now included with the rest of the municipality in the Lower Sava Statistical Region.

== Name ==
The name of the settlement was changed from Sveti Križ pri Kostanjevici (literally, 'Holy Cross near Kostanjevica') to Podbočje (literally, 'below the slope') in 1952. The name was changed on the basis of the 1948 Law on Names of Settlements and Designations of Squares, Streets, and Buildings as part of efforts by Slovenia's postwar communist government to remove religious elements from toponyms. In the past the German name was Heiligenkreuz.

== Church ==
The parish church in the village is dedicated to the Holy Cross and belongs to the Roman Catholic Diocese of Novo Mesto. It is a Neo-Gothic church built in 1907.
