= Prelesje, Šentrupert =

Prelesje
- Location in Slovenia
- Coordinates: 45°57′47.36″N 15°6′15.32″E
- Country: Slovenia
- Traditional region: Lower Carniola
- Statistical region: Southeast Slovenia
- Municipality: Šentrupert

Area
  - Total: 0.87 km^{2} (0.34 sq mi)
- Elevation: 249.4 m (818 ft)

Population (2002)
  - Total: 121

Prelesje (pronounced [pɾɛˈleːsjɛ]) is a settlement in the Municipality of Šentrupert in southeastern Slovenia. The area is part of the historical region of Lower Carniola. The municipality is now included in the Southeast Slovenia Statistical Region. The railway line from Sevnica to Trebnje runs just south of the settlement.
