= Velká Jesenice =

- Municipality
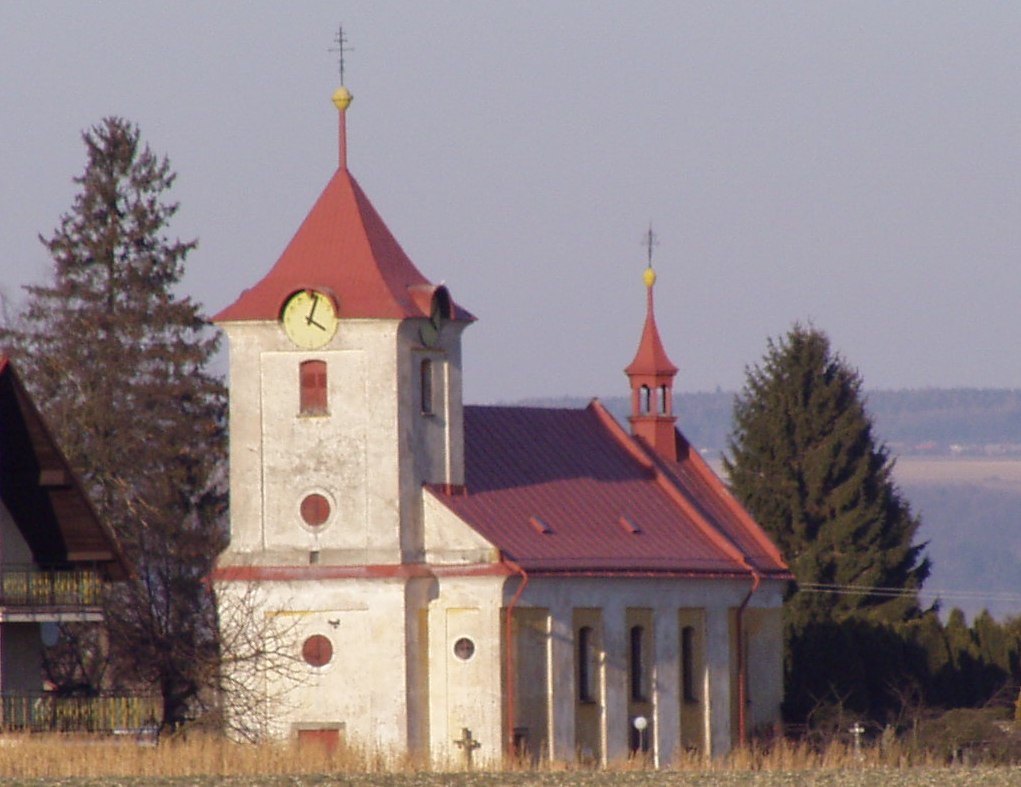
- Church of the Assumption of the Virgin Mary

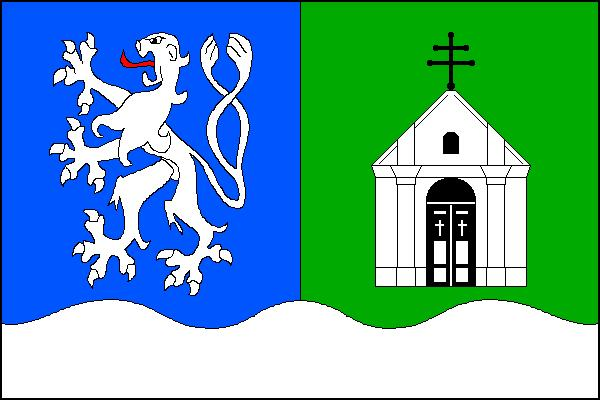
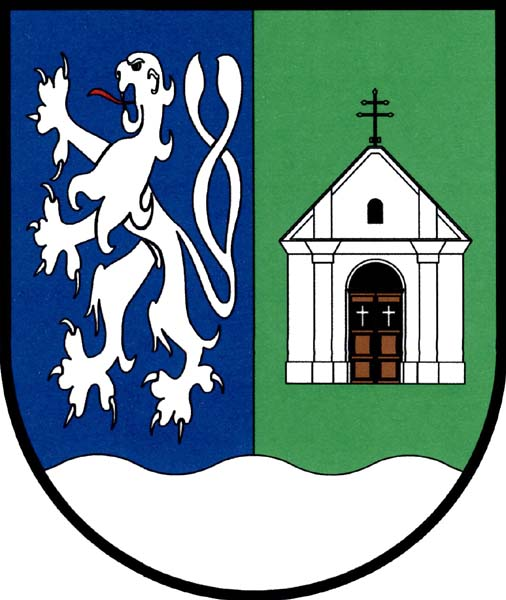
- Flag Coat of arms

- Location in the Czech Republic
- Coordinates: 50°21′40″N 16°2′16″E
- Country: Czech Republic
- Region: Hradec Králové
- District: Náchod
- First mentioned: 1436

Area
  - Total: 14.72 km^{2} (5.68 sq mi)
- Elevation: 286 m (938 ft)

Population (2026-01-01)
  - Total: 733
  - Density: 49.8/km^{2} (129/sq mi)
- Time zone: UTC+1 (CET)
  - Summer (DST): UTC+2 (CEST)
- Postal codes: 551 01, 552 24
- Website: velkajesenice.cz

Velká Jesenice (German: Groß Jessenitz) is a municipality and village in Náchod District in the Hradec Králové Region of the Czech Republic. It has about 700 inhabitants.

== Administrative division ==
Velká Jesenice consists of three municipal parts (in brackets population according to the 2021 census):

- Velká Jesenice (632)
- Veselice (35)
- Volovka (44)

== Demographics ==
Historical population
Year	Pop.	±%
1869	1,148	—
1880	1,160	+1.0%
1890	1,191	+2.7%
1900	1,153	−3.2%
1910	1,151	−0.2%
1921	1,098	−4.6%
1930	1,135	+3.4%
1950	910	−19.8%
1961	891	−2.1%
1970	834	−6.4%
1980	807	−3.2%
1991	736	−8.8%
2001	722	−1.9%
2011	719	−0.4%
2021	711	−1.1%
Source: Censuses
