= Okrog, Šentrupert =

Okrog
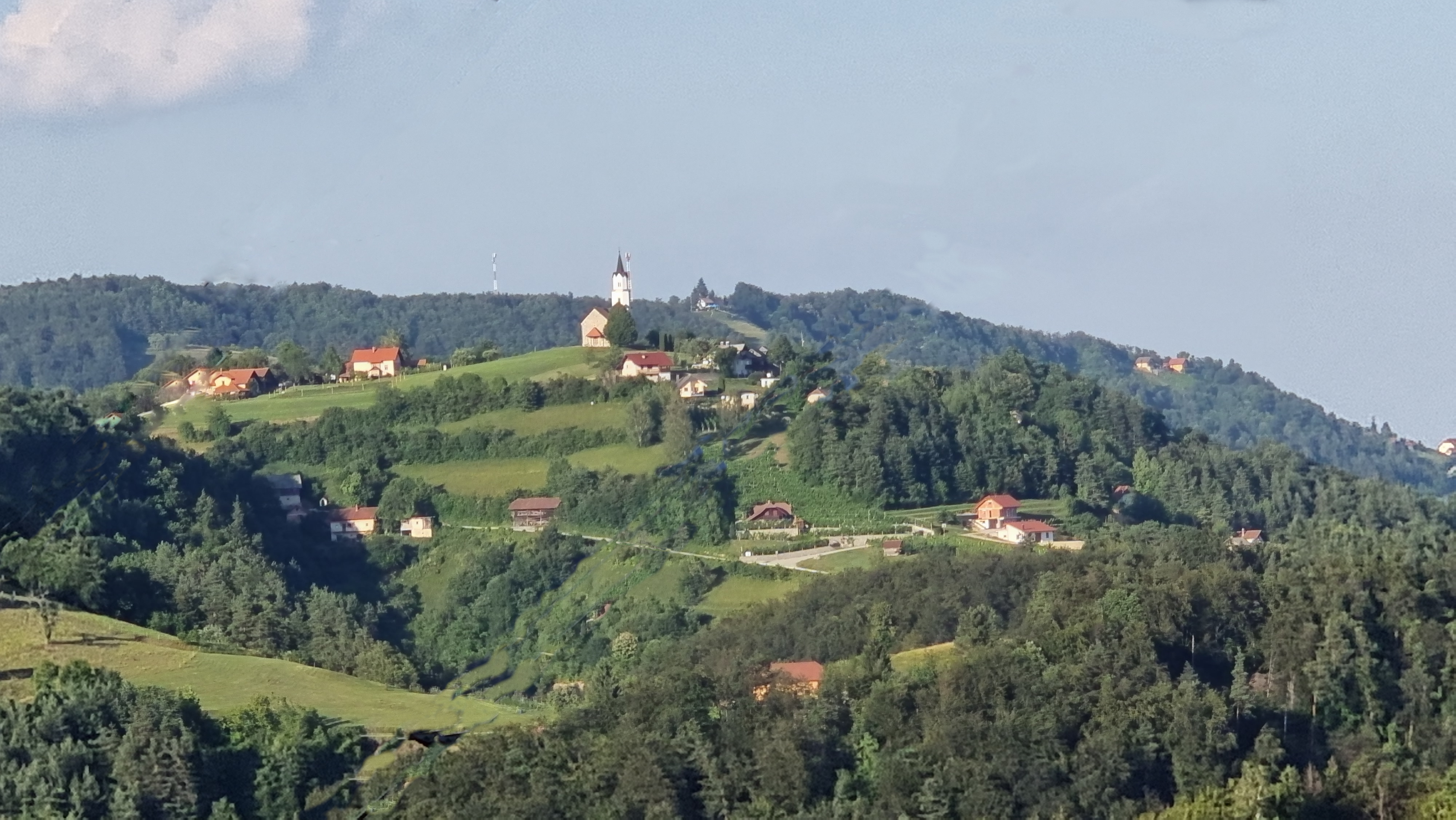

- Location in Slovenia
- Coordinates: 45°59′22.03″N 15°3′27.23″E
- Country: Slovenia
- Traditional region: Lower Carniola
- Statistical region: Southeast Slovenia
- Municipality: Šentrupert

Area
  - Total: 1.43 km^{2} (0.55 sq mi)
- Elevation: 427.6 m (1,403 ft)

Population (2012)
  - Total: 93
  - Density: 65/km^{2} (170/sq mi)

Okrog (pronounced [ɔˈkɾoːk]) is a settlement in the Municipality of Šentrupert in southeastern Slovenia. The area is part of the historical region of Lower Carniola. The municipality is now included in the Southeast Slovenia Statistical Region.

The local church is dedicated to Saint Barbara and belongs to the Parish of Šentrupert. It dates to the mid-15th century with some 17th-century remodelling.
