= Zabukovje, Šentrupert =

Zabukovje
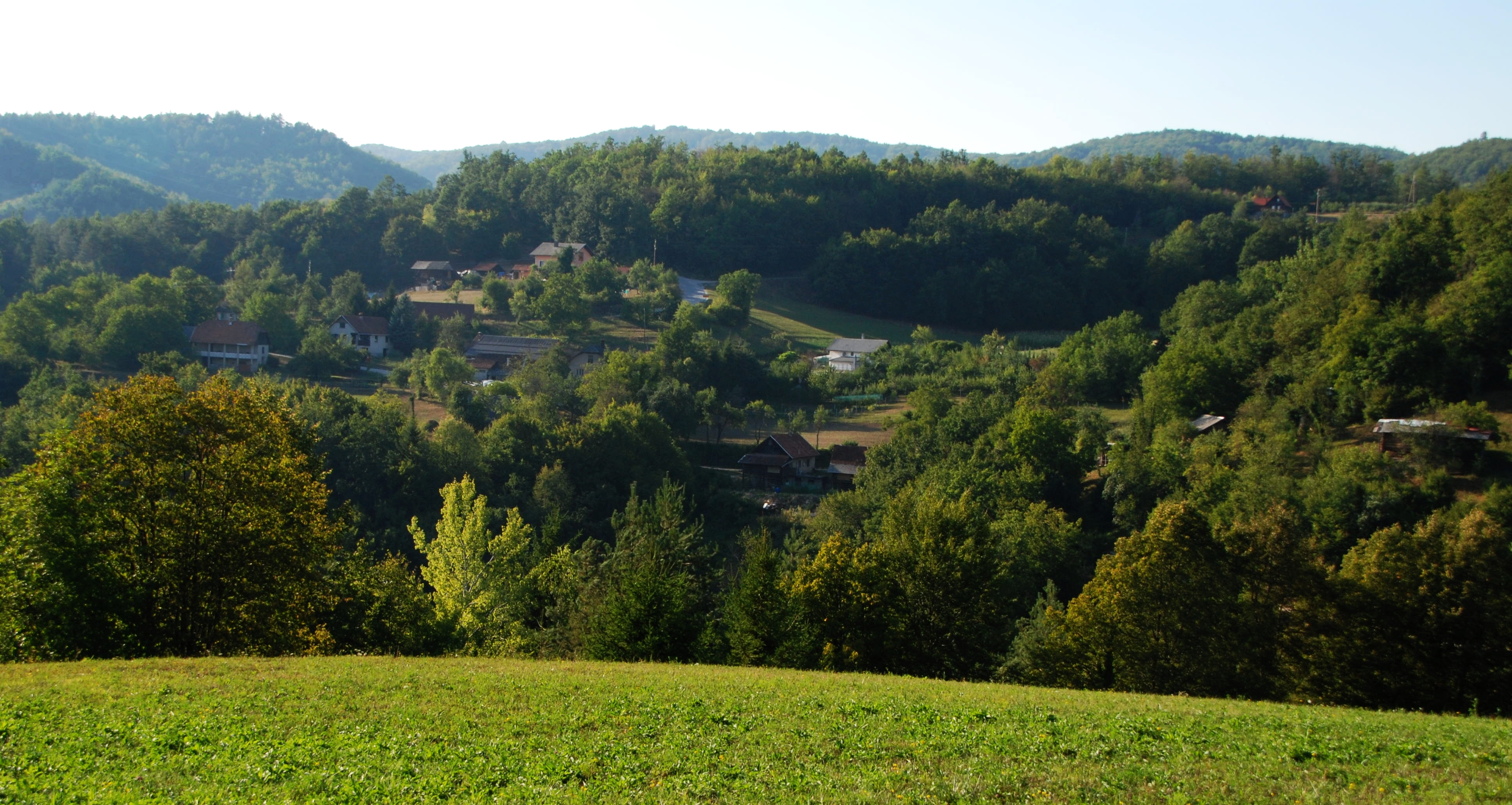

- Location in Slovenia
- Coordinates: 45°58′59.38″N 15°2′34.71″E
- Country: Slovenia
- Traditional region: Lower Carniola
- Statistical region: Southeast Slovenia
- Municipality: Šentrupert

Area
  - Total: 3.71 km^{2} (1.43 sq mi)
- Elevation: 349.6 m (1,147 ft)

Population (2002)
  - Total: 25

Zabukovje (pronounced [zaˈbuːkɔu̯jɛ]; German: Sabukuje) is a dispersed settlement in the Municipality of Šentrupert in southeastern Slovenia. It lies in the hills west of Šentrupert and north of Mirna. The area is part of the historical region of Lower Carniola. The municipality is now included in the Southeast Slovenia Statistical Region.
