= Lešje =

Lešje may refer to:

- Lešje, Serbia, a village near Paraćin
- Lešje, Vojnik, a village in Slovenia
- Lešje, Majšperk, a village in Slovenia
- Lešje Monastery, a Serbian Orthodox monastery in Lešje, Serbia
