= Príles =

Coordinates: 48°57′N 18°08′E

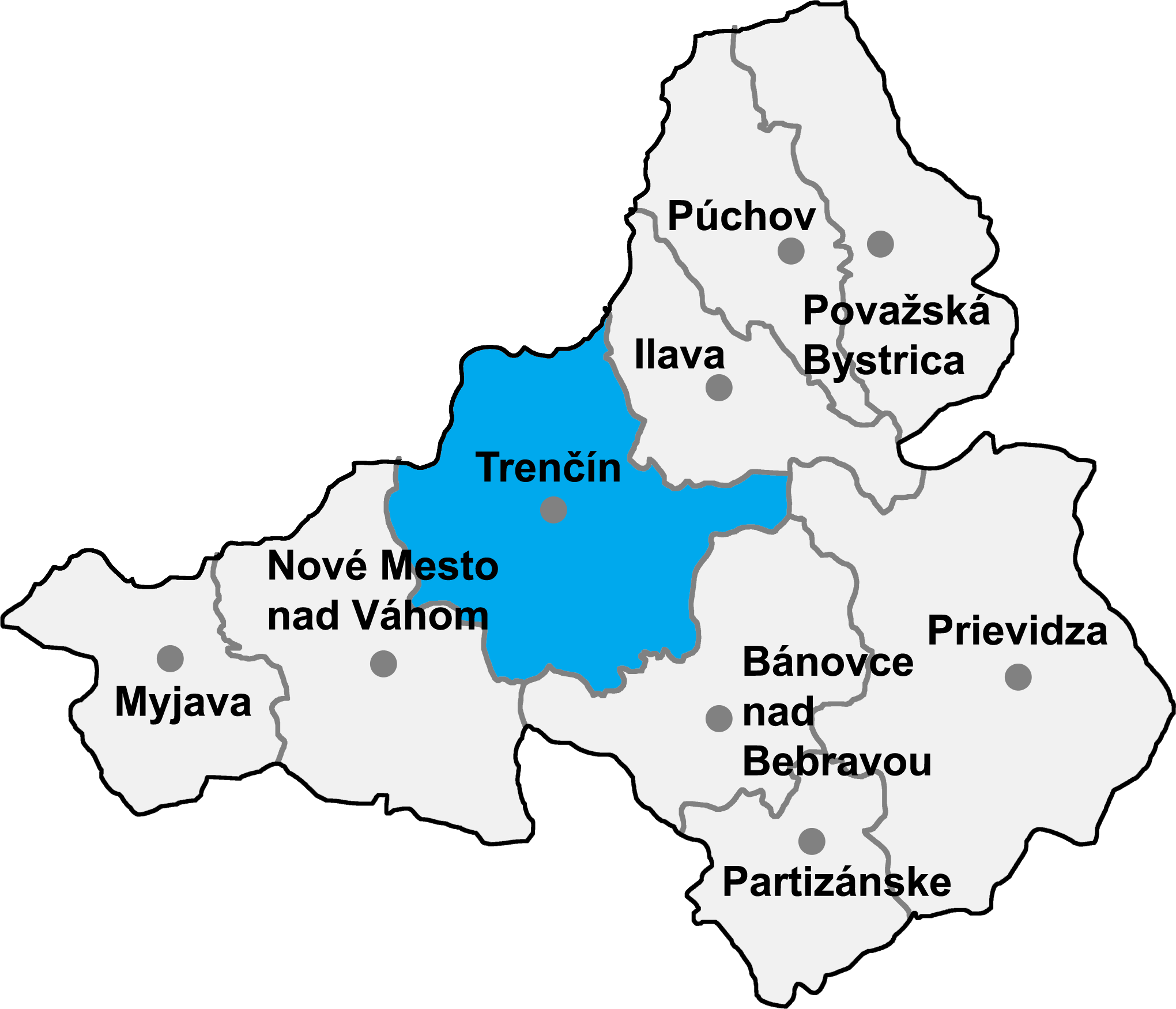
Location of Trenčín District in the Trenčín Region

Príles (Hungarian: Prilesz) is the local part of Trenčianska Teplá.

== History ==
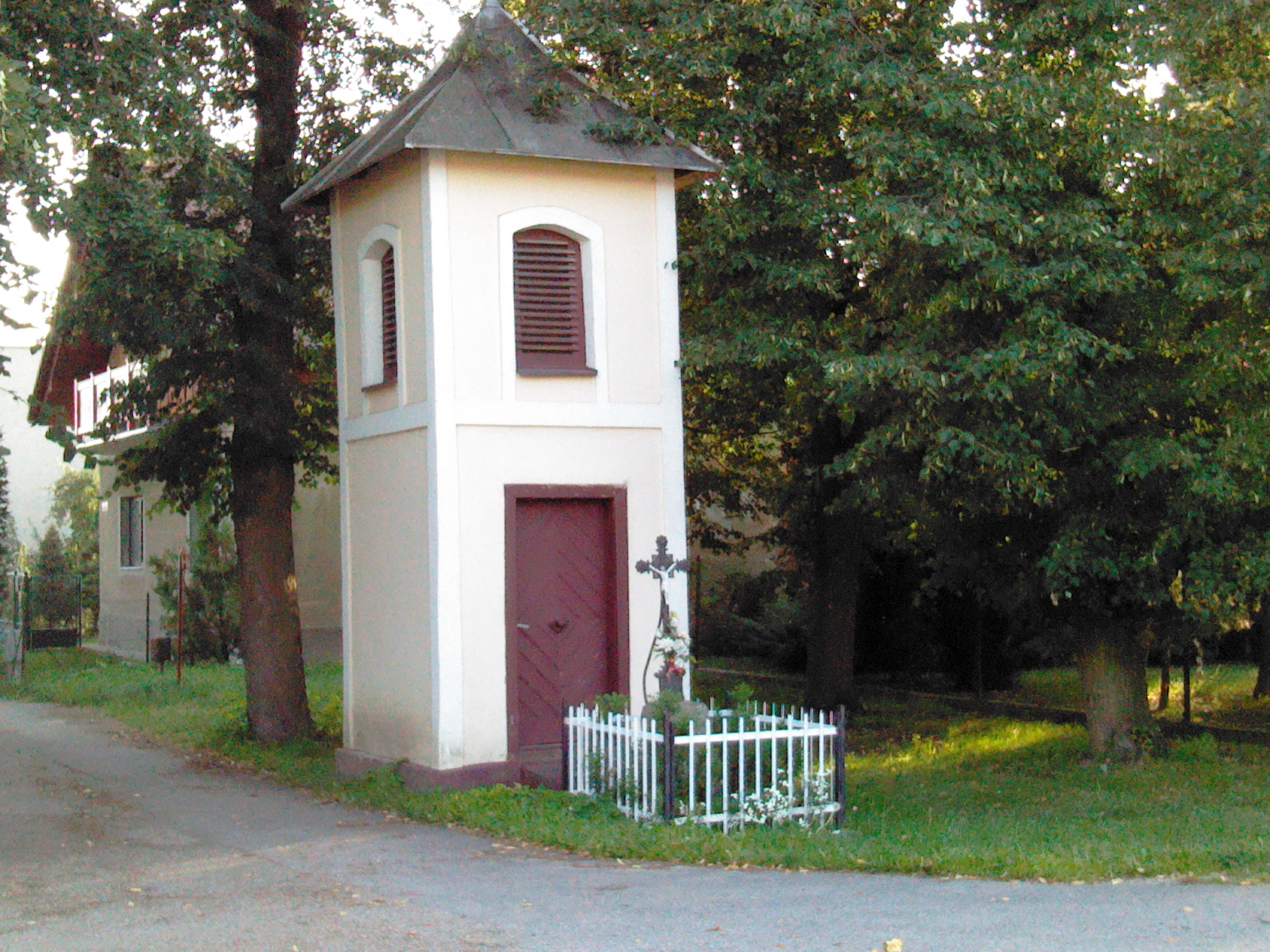
Belfry in Príles

The first mention comes from the 1351. Príles owning families: Prileszky, Hudcovics, Máriássy, Skrbenský... In 1913, it joined nearly village Trenčianska Teplá.

== Geography ==
Located between the Dubnica nad Váhom and Trenčianska Teplá.
