= Municipality of Šentrupert =

Municipality of Slovenia

Municipality of Šentrupert Občina Šentrupert
- Municipality
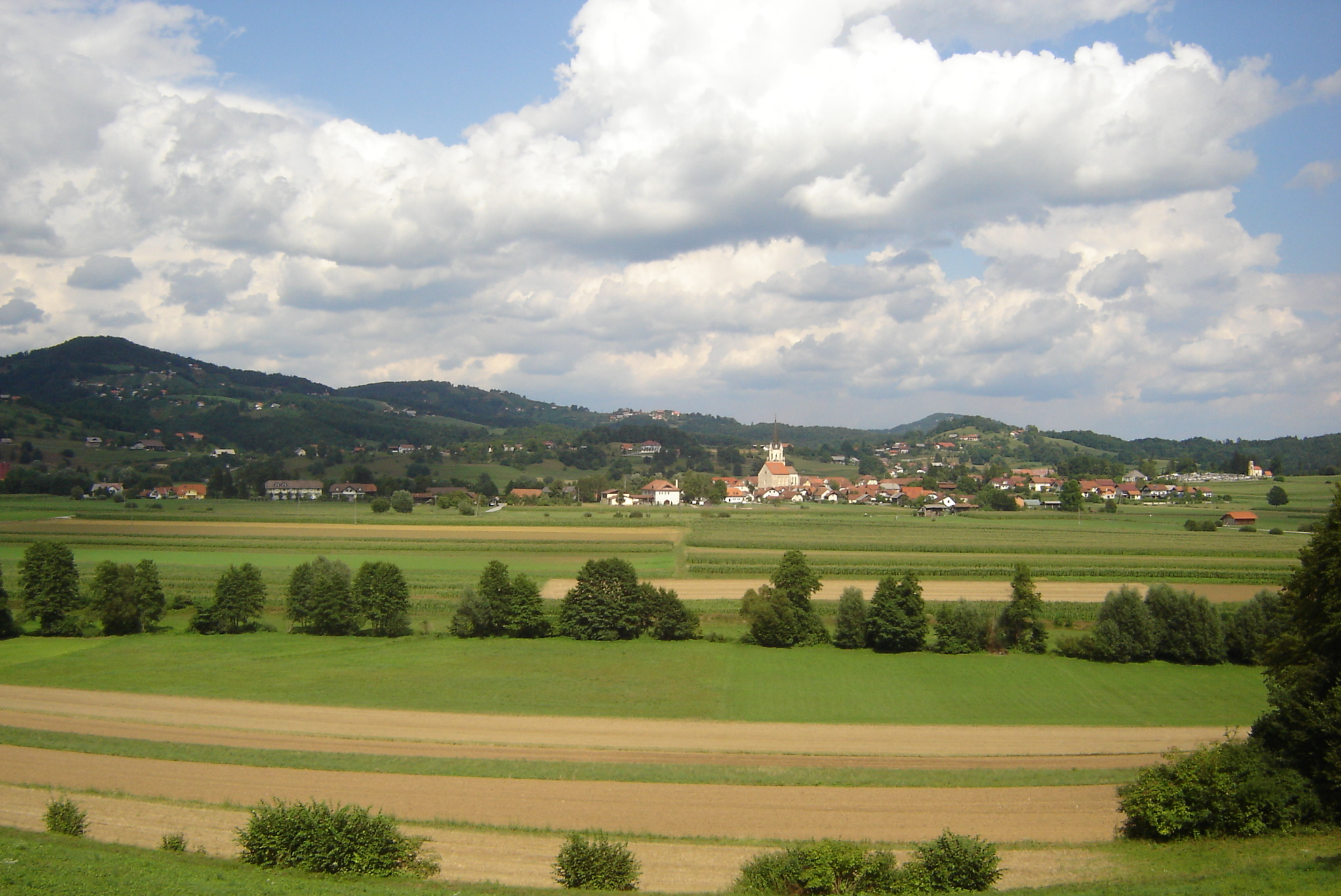

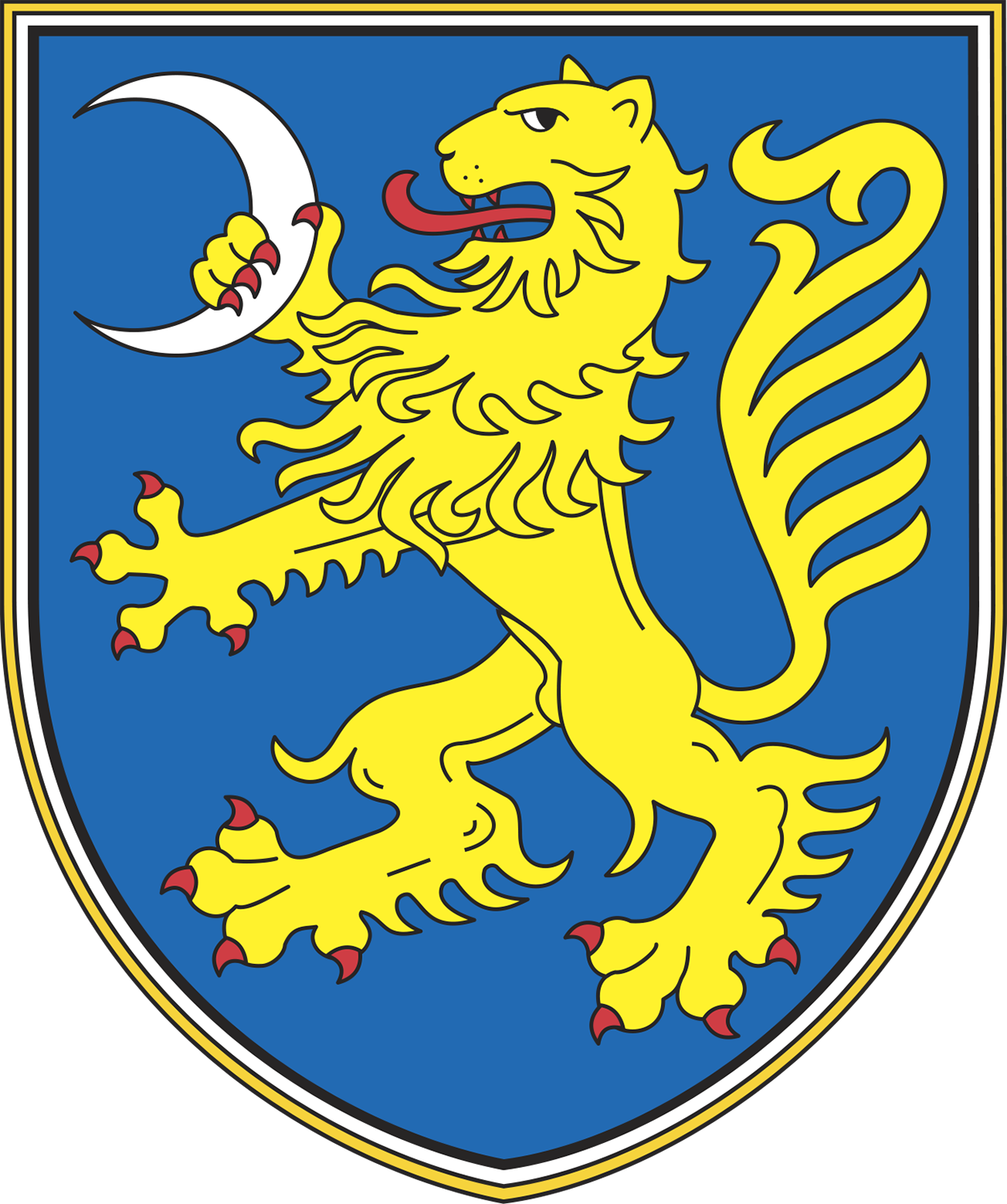
- Coat of arms

- Location of the Municipality of Šentrupert in Slovenia
- Coordinates: 45°58′30″N 15°05′30″E
- Country: Slovenia
- Established: 2006

Government
  - Mayor: Andrej Martin Kostelec

Area
  - Total: 49 km^{2} (19 sq mi)

Population (2018)
  - Total: 2,900
  - Density: 59/km^{2} (150/sq mi)
- Time zone: UTC+01 (CET)
  - Summer (DST): UTC+02 (CEST)
- Postal code: 8232
- Website: www.sentrupert.si

The Municipality of Šentrupert (Slovene: Občina Šentrupert) is a municipality in southeastern Slovenia. The seat of the municipality is the town of Šentrupert. The area is part of the traditional region of Lower Carniola. It is now included in the Southeast Slovenia Statistical Region.

Šentrupert was established on 14 June 2006. Before that date, it was a local community within the Municipality of Trebnje.

On 15 April 2010, the municipal councillors adopted a coat of arms and flag proposed by Aleksander Hribovšek. The coat of arms was based upon that posthumously and fictitiously attributed to Hemma of Gurk and that of the family of Barbo von Waxenstein. It consists of a lion or (gold) on a field azure (blue) holding a crescent argent (silver) in its right paw.

== Settlements ==
In addition to the municipal seat of Šentrupert, the municipality also includes the following settlements:

- Bistrica
- Brinje
- Dolenje Jesenice
- Draga pri Šentrupertu
- Gorenje Jesenice
- Hom
- Hrastno
- Kamnje
- Kostanjevica
- Mali Cirnik pri Šentjanžu
- Okrog
- Prelesje
- Ravne nad Šentrupertom
- Rakovnik pri Šentrupertu
- Ravnik
- Roženberk
- Škrljevo
- Slovenska Vas
- Straža
- Trstenik
- Vesela Gora
- Vrh
- Zabukovje
- Zaloka
