= Jasenice (Třebíč District) =

- Municipality
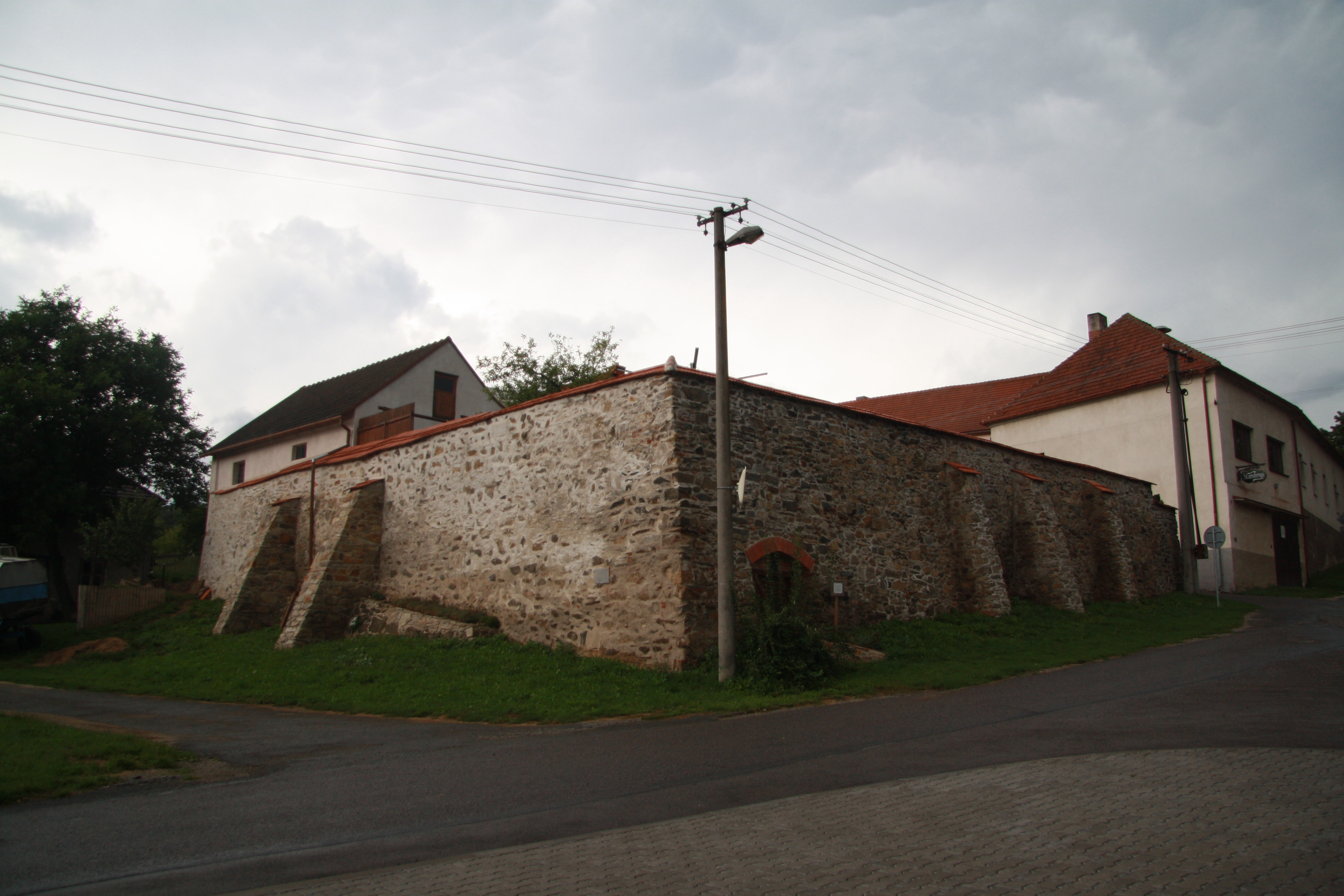
- Jasenice Fortress

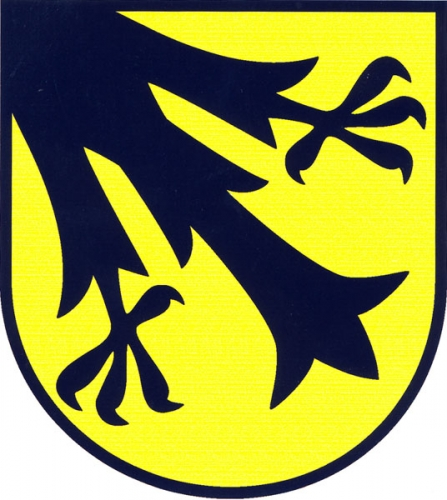
- Flag Coat of arms

- Location in the Czech Republic
- Coordinates: 49°15′29″N 16°9′49″E
- Country: Czech Republic
- Region: Vysočina
- District: Třebíč
- First mentioned: 1353

Area
  - Total: 5.92 km^{2} (2.29 sq mi)
- Elevation: 415 m (1,362 ft)

Population (2026-01-01)
  - Total: 196
  - Density: 33.1/km^{2} (85.7/sq mi)
- Time zone: UTC+1 (CET)
  - Summer (DST): UTC+2 (CEST)
- Postal code: 675 71
- Website: www.jasenice.cz

Jasenice is a municipality and village in Třebíč District in the Vysočina Region of the Czech Republic. It has about 200 inhabitants.

Jasenice lies approximately 22 kilometres (14 mi) east of Třebíč, 45 km (28 mi) east of Jihlava, and 156 km (97 mi) south-east of Prague.

== Demographics ==
Historical population
Year	Pop.	±%
1869	289	—
1880	306	+5.9%
1890	305	−0.3%
1900	343	+12.5%
1910	341	−0.6%
1921	351	+2.9%
1930	345	−1.7%
1950	261	−24.3%
1961	322	+23.4%
1970	279	−13.4%
1980	220	−21.1%
1991	201	−8.6%
2001	213	+6.0%
2011	211	−0.9%
2021	176	−16.6%
Source: Censuses
