= Gorenje Jesenice =

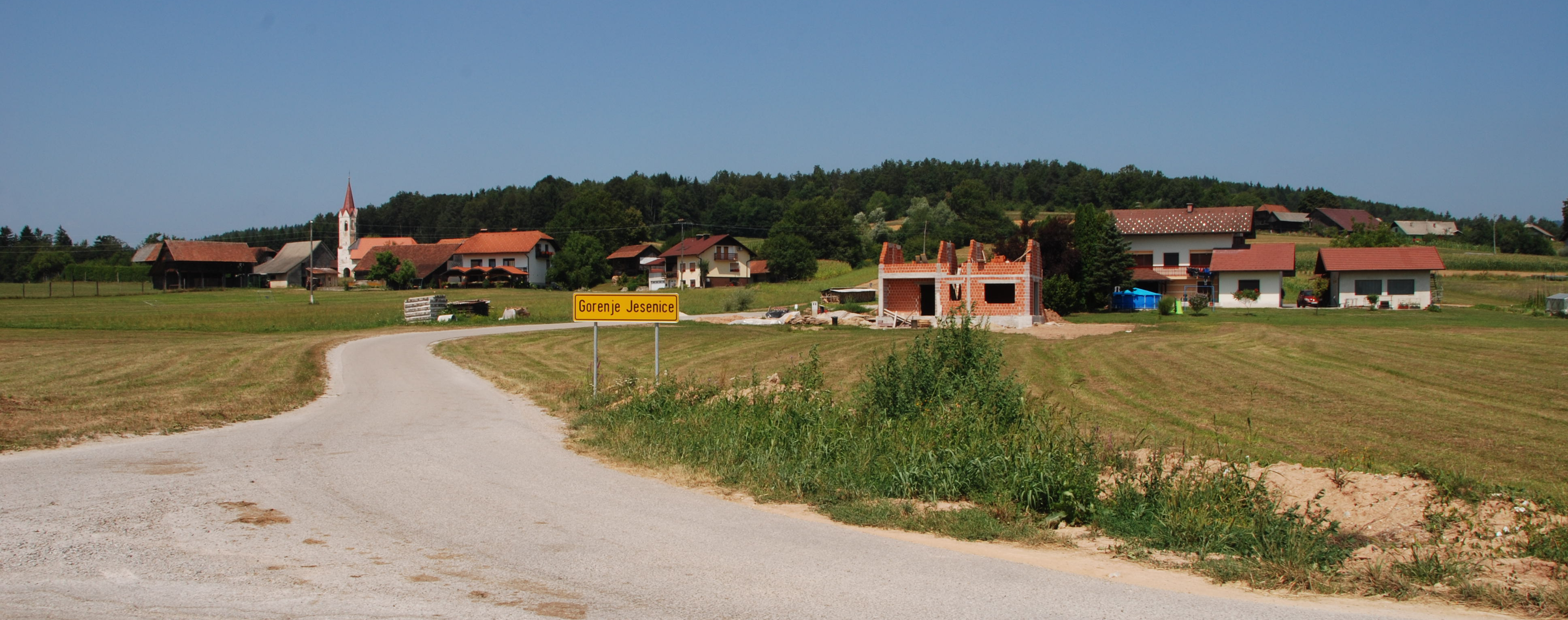
- View of Gorenje Jesenice from the east standing on the main local road

- Location in Slovenia
- Coordinates: 45°58′2.14″N 15°7′42.17″E
- Country: Slovenia
- Traditional region: Lower Carniola
- Statistical region: Southeast Slovenia
- Municipality: Šentrupert

Area
  - Total: 1.54 km^{2} (0.59 sq mi)
- Elevation: 245.7 m (806 ft)

Population (2002)
  - Total: 111

Gorenje Jesenice (pronounced [ɡɔˈɾeːnjɛ jɛsɛˈniːtsɛ]; German: Oberjessenitz) is a village in the Municipality of Šentrupert in southeastern Slovenia. The area is part of the historical region of Lower Carniola. The municipality is now included in the Southeast Slovenia Statistical Region.

The local church is dedicated to Saint Cantius (Slovene: sveti Kancijan) and belongs to the Parish of Šentrupert. It was first mentioned in written documents dating to 1526 with some 17th- and 18th-century remodelling.
