= Trstenik, Šentrupert =

Trstenik
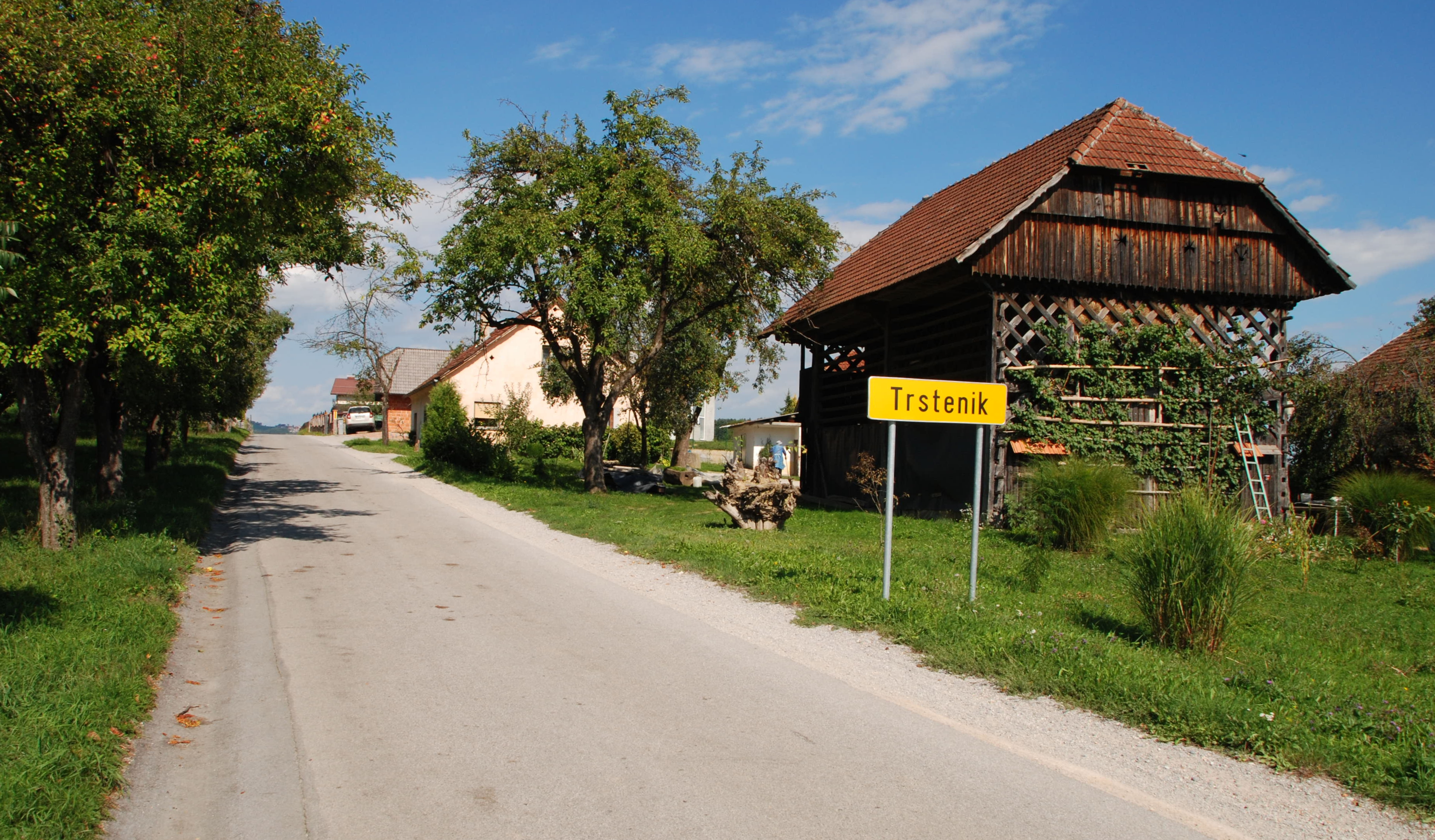

- Location in Slovenia
- Coordinates: 45°57′40.3″N 15°4′9.86″E
- Country: Slovenia
- Traditional region: Lower Carniola
- Statistical region: Southeast Slovenia
- Municipality: Šentrupert

Area
  - Total: 1.41 km^{2} (0.54 sq mi)
- Elevation: 275.9 m (905 ft)

Population (2002)
  - Total: 104

Trstenik (pronounced [təɾstɛˈniːk]) is a settlement in the Municipality of Šentrupert in southeastern Slovenia. It lies just northeast of Mirna in the historical region of Lower Carniola. The municipality is now included in the Southeast Slovenia Statistical Region. It includes the hamlets of Butara, Gorenji Konec (Slovene: Gorenji konec), Veliki Konec (Veliki konec), Kurja Dolina (Kurja dolina), Dolenji Konec (Doleji konec), Kot (German: Winkel), and Sotlo.
