= Šentjanž, Sevnica =

Šentjanž
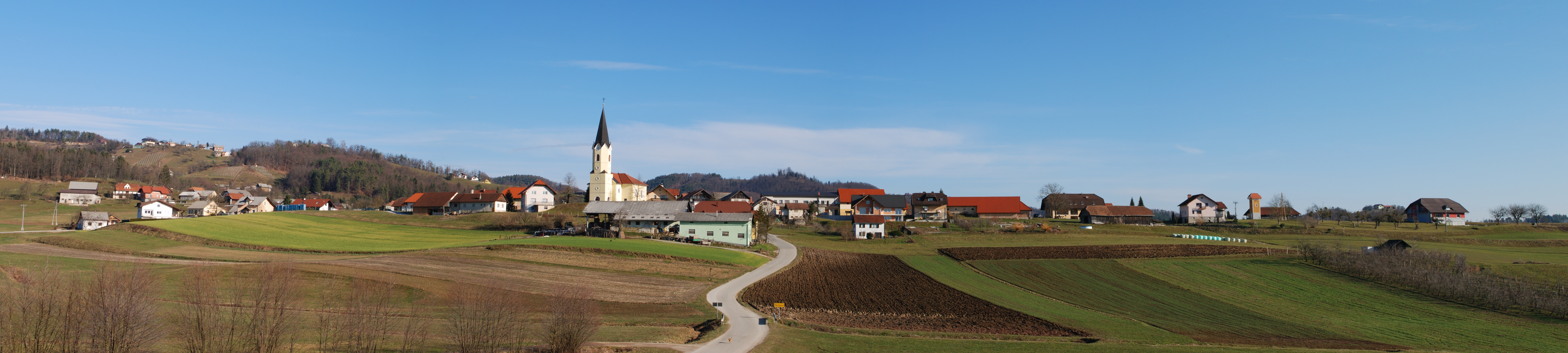
- View of Šentjanž from the southwest

- Location in Slovenia
- Coordinates: 46°0′40.67″N 15°10′7.12″E
- Country: Slovenia
- Traditional region: Lower Carniola
- Statistical region: Lower Sava
- Municipality: Sevnica

Area
  - Total: 2.35 km^{2} (0.91 sq mi)
- Elevation: 344 m (1,129 ft)

Population (2012)
  - Total: 393
  - Density: 168/km^{2} (440/sq mi)

Šentjanž (pronounced [sɛnˈtjaːnʃ] or [sənˈtjaːnʃ]; in older sources also Dvor, German: Johannisthal) is a village in the Municipality of Sevnica in east-central Slovenia. Traditionally, it belongs to Lower Carniola. The municipality is now included in the Lower Sava Statistical Region.

== Parish church ==
The local parish church from which the settlement gets its name is dedicated to John the Baptist (Slovene: sveti Janez Krstnik, contracted to Šentjanž) and belongs to the Roman Catholic Diocese of Novo Mesto. It was first mentioned in written documents dating to 1444 but was totally rebuilt around 1900.
