= Dolenje Jesenice =

- Location in Slovenia
- Coordinates: 45°58′15.7″N 15°8′15.18″E
- Country: Slovenia
- Traditional region: Lower Carniola
- Statistical region: Southeast Slovenia
- Municipality: Šentrupert

Area
  - Total: 1.13 km^{2} (0.44 sq mi)
- Elevation: 240.7 m (790 ft)

Population (2002)
  - Total: 61

Dolenje Jesenice (pronounced [dɔˈleːnjɛ jɛsɛˈniːtsɛ]; German: Unterjessenitz) is a small settlement in the Municipality of Šentrupert in southeastern Slovenia. The area is part of the historical region of Lower Carniola and is now included in the Southeast Slovenia Statistical Region.
