= Šentrupert =

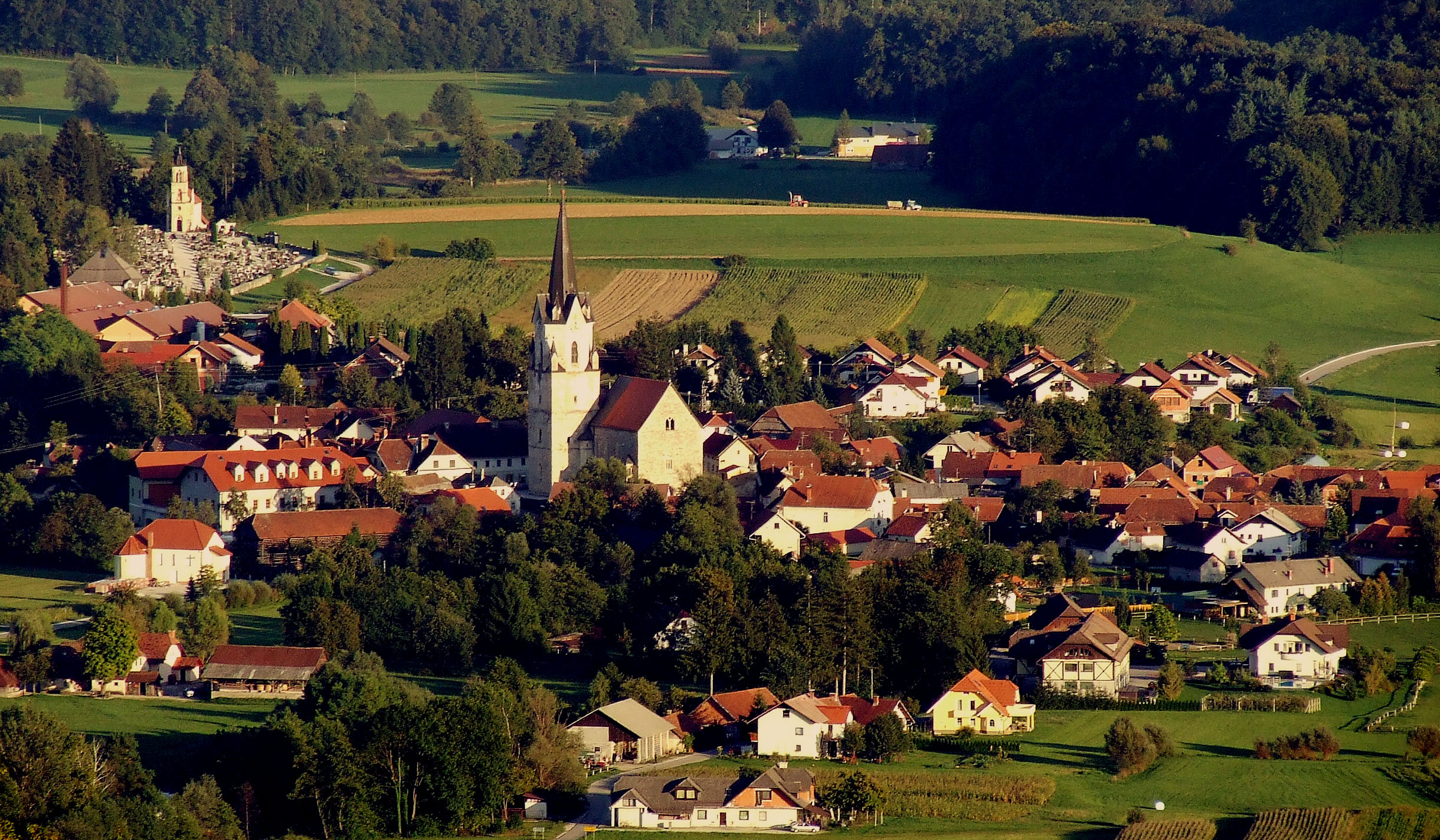

- Flag Coat of arms

- Location in Slovenia
- Coordinates: 45°58′37″N 15°5′23″E
- Country: Slovenia
- Traditional region: Lower Carniola
- Statistical region: Southeast Slovenia
- Municipality: Šentrupert

Area
  - Total: 1.2 km^{2} (0.46 sq mi)
- Elevation: 280 m (920 ft)

Population (2017)
  - Total: 310
  - Density: 269/km^{2} (700/sq mi)
- Postal code: 8232
- Website: https://www.sentrupert.si/

Šentrupert (pronounced [ʃɛnˈtɾúːpɛɾt, - ʃənˈ-]; German: Sankt Ruprecht) is a village in the traditional Lower Carniola region in southeastern Slovenia. In the past it was the cultural and economic centre of the Mirna Valley, but after the railway line bypassed the town the centre shifted to nearby Mirna. It is the seat of the Municipality of Šentrupert.

== Name ==
The name Šentrupert means 'Saint Rupert', referring to the local parish church. After the Second World War, there was an initiative by the new communist government to remove religious elements from toponyms (cf. Brecljevo, Podbočje, Podnanos, etc.). A proposal was made for Šentrupert to be renamed Dolenjski paradiž (literally, 'Lower Carniola paradise'), but it was not carried through.

== Landmarks ==
=== Parish church ===
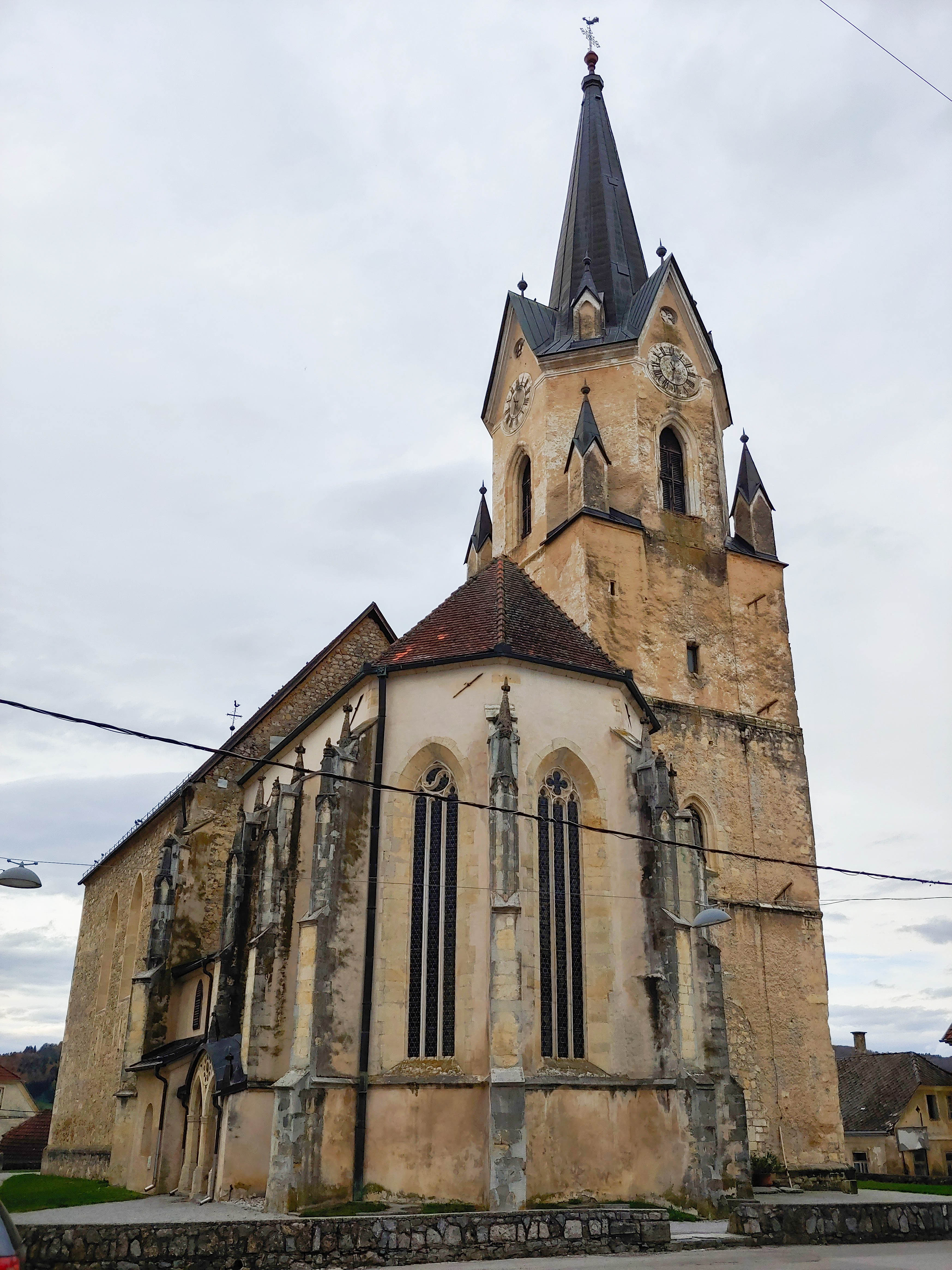
St. Rupert's Parish Church (2019)

The local parish church is dedicated to Saint Rupert and belongs to the Roman Catholic Diocese of Novo Mesto. It was first mentioned in written documents dating to 1163 and was restyled in the early 15th century.

=== Hayrack museum ===
Starting in 2011, the Municipality of Šentrupert has built the first ever open-air museum of hayracks in the southern part of the village. The museum started operating in June 2013. The collection, named "The Land of Hayracks" (Slovene: Dežela kozolcev), covers 2.5 hectares (6.2 acres) and includes 18 drying devices, among them 17 hayracks, with the oldest preserved from 1795, and presents all types of hayrack. The main organiser has been Rupert Gole, the Mayor of Šentrupert. The museum, which also serves as a place of cultural events, has been open since June 2013.

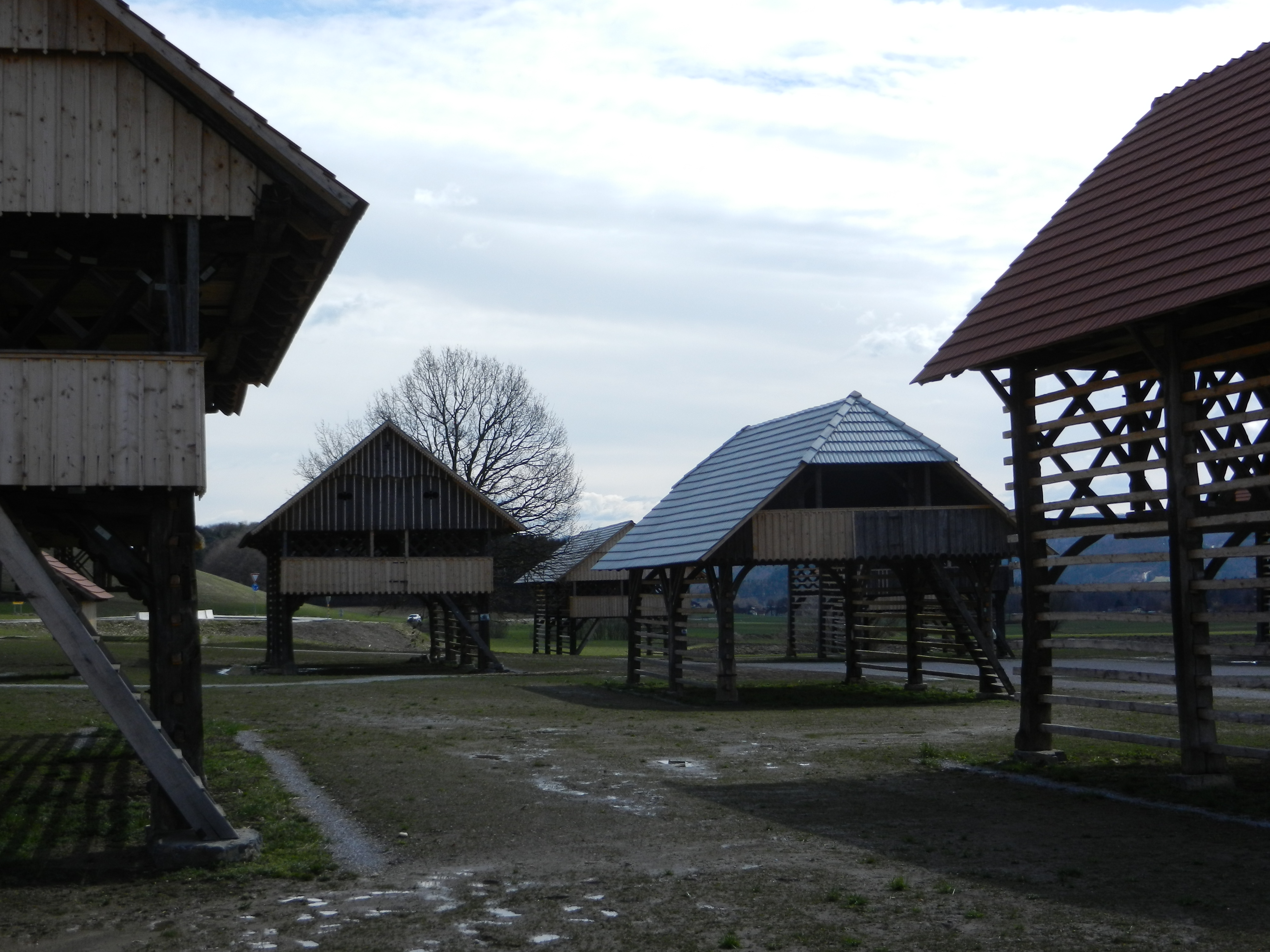
Land of Hayracks(2013)

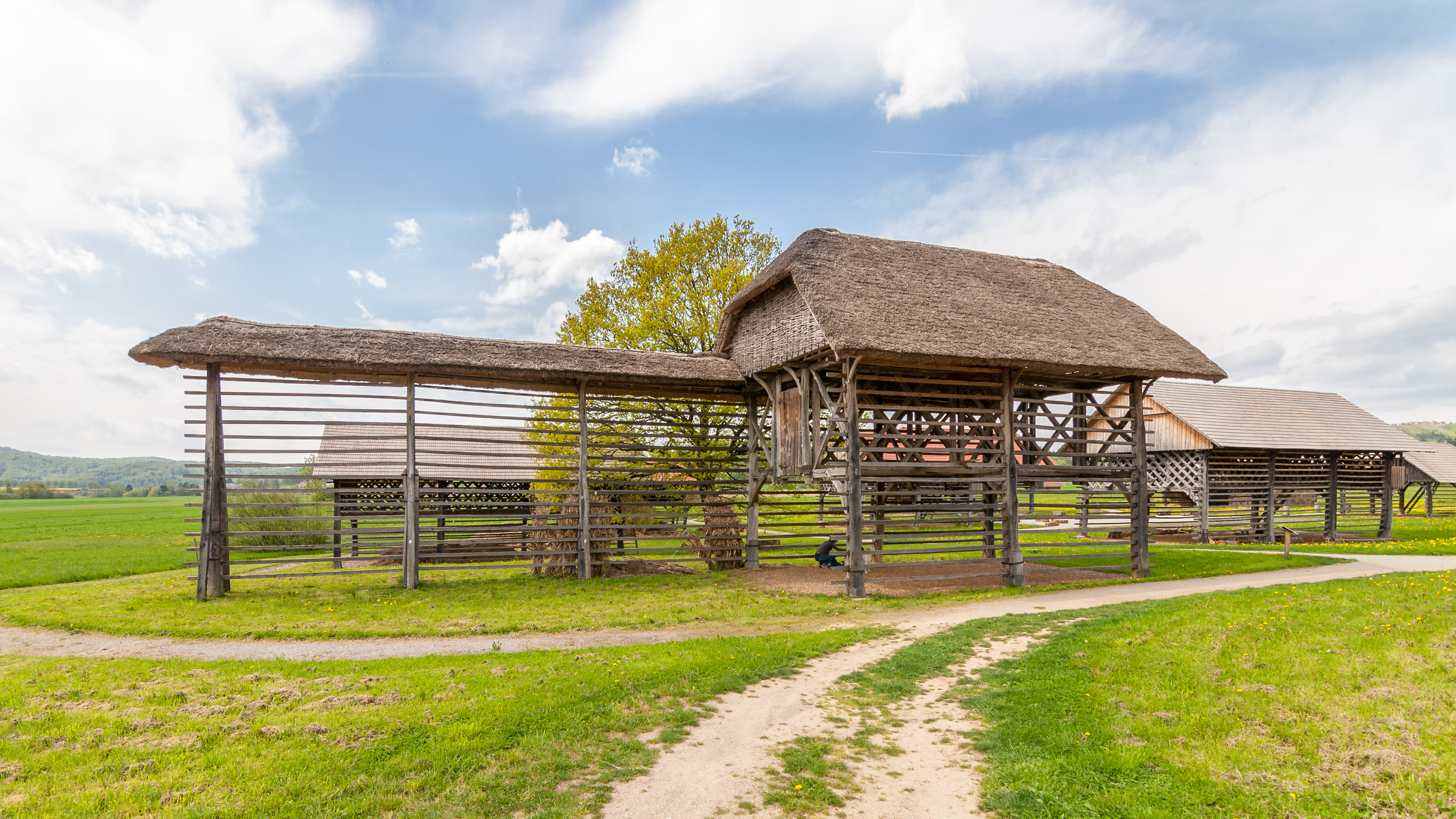
Roofed double hayrack with extension

Hayrack museum
