= Rebula =

Rebula may refer to:

- Alenka Rebula (born 1954), Slovene poet and psychotherapist
- Alojz Rebula (1924–2018), Slovene writer
- Jovan Rebula (born 1997), South African professional golfer
- Oto Rebula (1921–2001), Serbian athlete
- Ribolla Gialla, a white Italian wine grape
