= Opicina =

Opicina Opčine
- Frazione
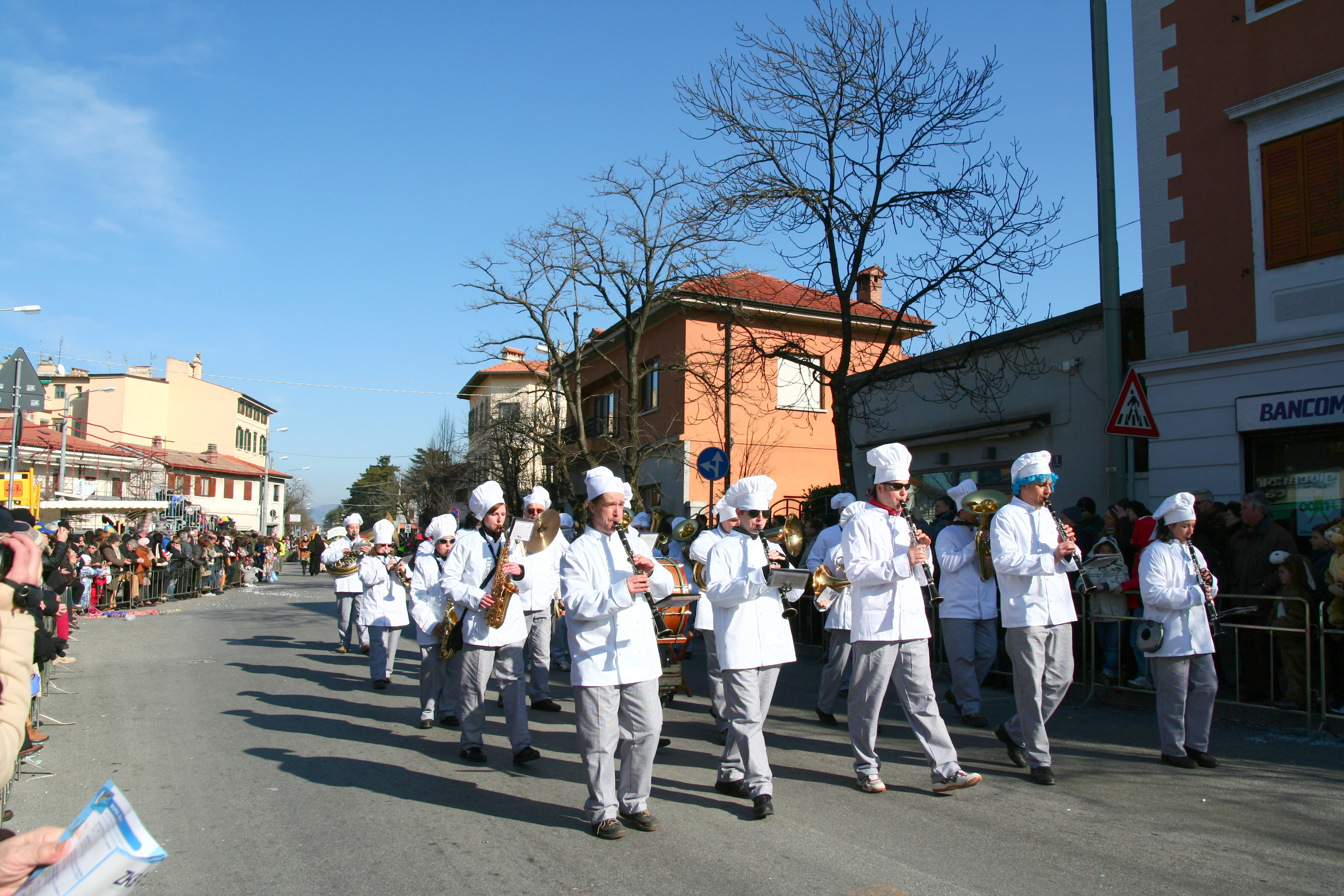
- Carnival feast at Opicina

- Location of Opicina; Opčine in Italy
- Coordinates: 45°41′15″N 13°47′19″E
- Country: Italy
- Region: Friuli-Venezia Giulia
- Province: Trieste (TS)
- Comune: Trieste
- Elevation: 330 m (1,080 ft)

Population (2015)
  - Total: 8,009
- Demonym: Opicinesi
- Time zone: UTC+1 (CET)
  - Summer (DST): UTC+2 (CEST)
- Postal code: 34151
- Dialing code: (+39) 040
- Patron saint: Bartholomew the Apostle

Opicina (Slovene: Opčine), formerly Poggioreale del Carso in Italian, is a town in northeastern Italy, close to the Slovenian border at Fernetti (Slovene: Fernetiči). Opicina is a frazione of the comune of Trieste, the provincial and regional capital. The town has a large Slovene population, with Slovenian being widely used alongside Italian in private and public institutions. The first town near Opicina is Sežana in Slovenia, there is also the next railway station.

== Geography ==
It is located on the Karst Plateau, 3 miles north of Trieste, a seaport on the Adriatic Sea.

=== Name ===
The name Opicina is of Slovene origin. It derives from "ob p'čine" ("ob pečini" in modern standard Slovene), meaning "by the cliff". Thus, it is among the Italian towns and villages in Friuli-Venezia Giulia with a name of Slavic origin. Before World War I, it used to be known in Italian as Opcina, a name still used in the local Triestine dialect. During the Fascist regime, the name was first Italianized into Villa Opicina, and subsequently renamed to Poggioreale del Carso. In 1966 it was renamed again as Villa Opicina. However, it has been frequently referred to as Opicina, including on road signs.

== History and culture ==
=== Population ===
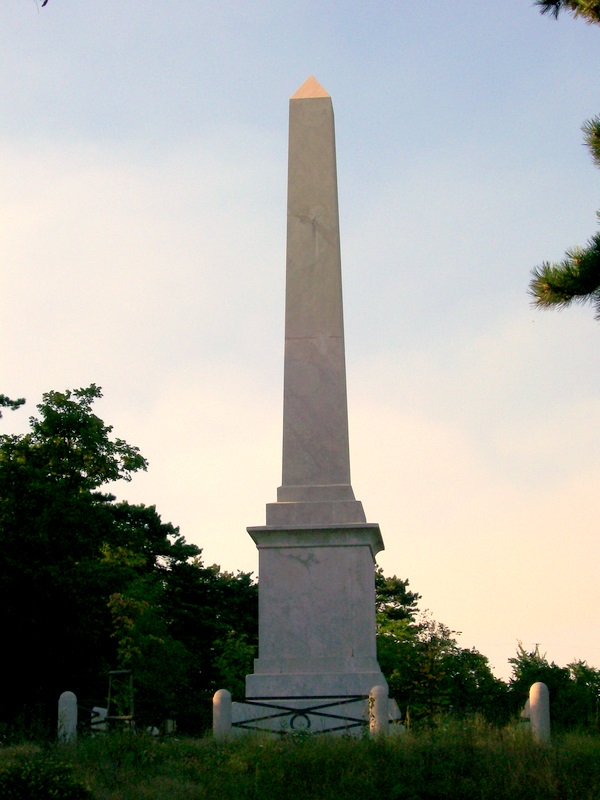
Obelisk erected in honor of Francis I

It is inhabited by a Slovene minority in Italy. According to the last Austrian census of 1911, over 89% of the population was of Slovene ethnicity. In the following decades, this number fell significantly: according to the census of 1971, just above half of the population of the settlement belonged to the Slovene speaking community, while the rest were mostly Italian speakers.

Since the 1990s, immigration from the city of Trieste and other predominantly Italian-speaking areas has most probably reduced the Slovene speakers to a minority. However, Slovene language is still widely used in the settlement, both in private and public life. Most of the official signs are bilingual, Italian and Slovene.

The local Slovenes speak a distinctive version of the Inner Carniolan dialect, which shows strong influences of the neighboring Karst dialect.

== Transport ==
The railway station Villa Opicina serves trains entering Italy from Slovenia, and as of 2025, provides three daily services to and from Trieste. At railway station is bus station also. From there the local buses connect village center and Trieste.

The Trieste–Opicina tramway, a unique hybrid of a tramway and funicular railway, links Villa Opicina with Oberdan Square in Trieste's city centre.

== Notable people ==
- Alojz Rebula
- Zora Tavčar
- Alenka Rebula Tuta

== See also ==
- Trieste–Opicina tramway
- Slovene minority in Italy
