= Trieste–Opicina tramway =

Hybrid tramway and funicular railway in Trieste, Italy

Coordinates: 45.6705°N 13.7891°E

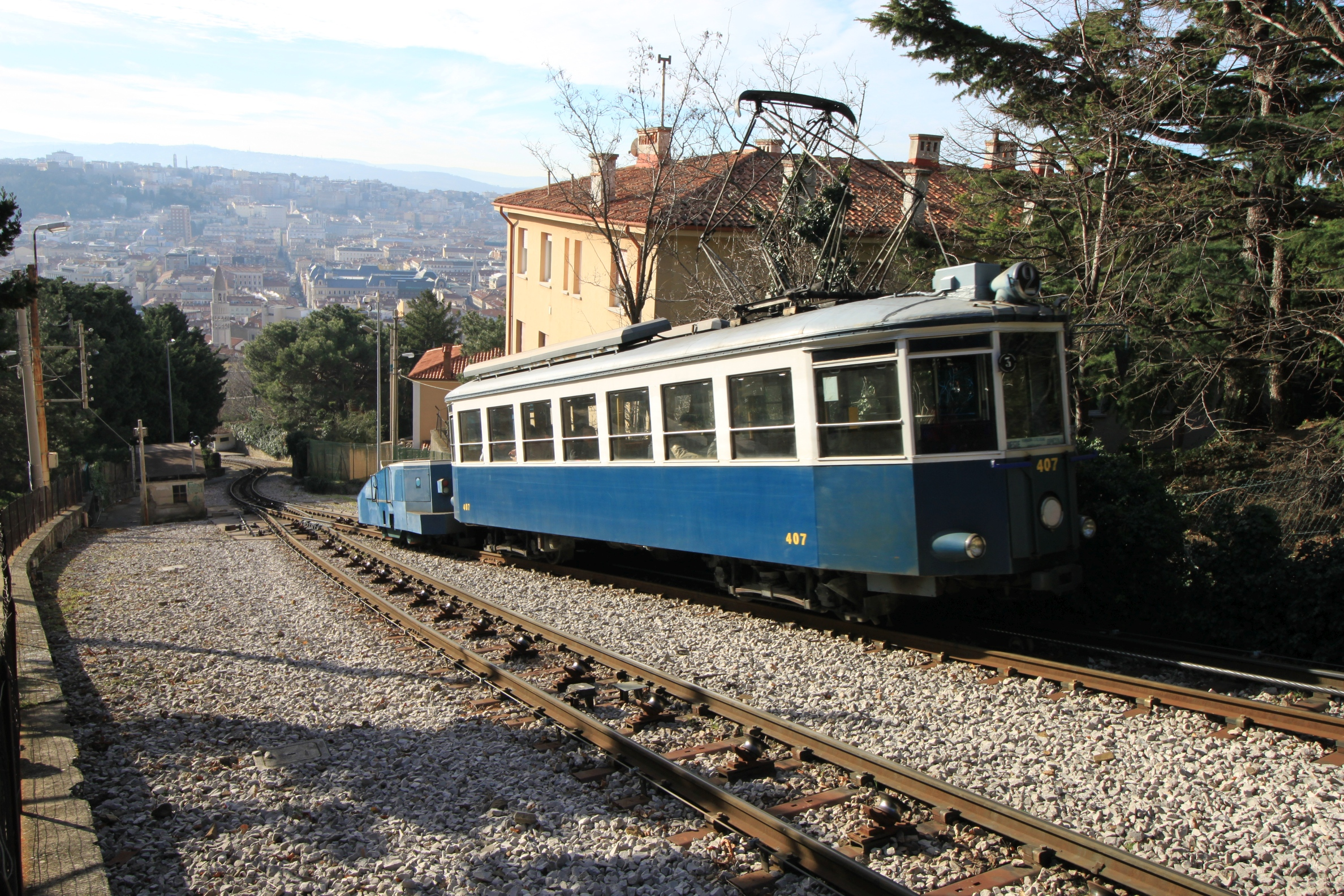
- Opicina Tramway, on the cable-hauled section. The city of Trieste can be seen in the background.

Overview
- Locale: Trieste, Italy
- Transit type: Hybrid tram / funicular
- Number of lines: 1
- Number of stations: 13

Operation
- Began operation: 1902
- Operator: Trieste Trasporti
- Number of vehicles: 8 tramcars + 2 cable tractors

Technical
- System length: 5.2 km (3.2 mi) (799 m or 2,621 ft cable section)
- Track gauge: 1,000 mm (3 ft 3 3/8 in) metre gauge
- Electrification: Overhead line, 550 V DC
System map

The Trieste–Opicina tramway (Italian: Tranvia Trieste-Opicina, Slovene: openski tramvaj, Triestine: Tram de Opcina) is an unusual hybrid tramway and funicular railway in the city of Trieste, Italy. It links Piazza Oberdan, on the northern edge of the city centre, with the village of Villa Opicina in the hills above.

An accident in August 2016 led to the line's closure, with a replacement bus service operating. Reopening of the line was delayed repeatedly until 2025. It resumed operations on February 1, 2025, but failed again in October 2025. This has resulted in further maintenance work until 20 July 2026.

For most of the journey, the line operates as a conventional, electrically powered tramway, with a mixture of street running and reserved track. On the steepest section of the line, between Piazza Scorcola and Vetta Scorcola, the trams are pushed uphill and braked downhill by a pair of cable tractors that operate on funicular principles.

The line forms part of the network of Trieste Trasporti, the public transport provider for Trieste.

== History ==
=== As a rack and adhesion line ===
Although the Austrian Southern Railway first arrived in Villa Opicina in 1857, the Villa Opicina railway station was situated some distance from the village, and the local topography forced a circuitous 32 km (20 mi) railway route between Opicina and Trieste. As a result, various projects were promoted to link the two places more directly, resulting eventually in the construction of the Opicina Tramway by the Società Anonima delle Piccole Ferrovie di Trieste.

The line was opened in 1902, and as built incorporated a rack railway section between Piazza Scorcola and Vetta Scorcola. Conventional four-wheel tramcars operated the full length of the line, being assisted up and down the rack section by three small rack locomotives. In 1906 the line was extended at its top end from the village of Villa Opicina to Villa Opicina station, a distance of 1.2 km (0.75 mi).

=== As a hybrid funicular and tramway ===
In 1928 the rack railway section was replaced with a funicular section, and the rack locomotives by cable tractors. However, the original four-wheel trams continued running until 1935, when they were replaced by new bogie cars. The extension to Villa Opicina station was closed in 1938. After nearly 60 years of private ownership, the line was taken over by the municipality of Trieste in 1961.

The line has been modernised several times over the years, most recently in 2005–2006 and 2012–2014. However, it still uses four of the five 1935-built tramcars, supplemented by two similar cars built in 1942. Two of the original four-wheel cars have survived, and one sees occasional use as an operational museum car. New unmanned cable tractors were provided during the 2005–2006 rebuild, which are remotely operated by the tram drivers.

=== August 2016 accident ===
On 14 August 2016, trams 404 and 405 were involved in a collision at the passing loop at Conconello on the upper section of the line. Both cars were badly damaged, whilst eight passengers and both drivers were injured, with six requiring hospital treatment. Since only three cars were in operational condition following the accident, service on the line was temporarily suspended and replaced by buses.

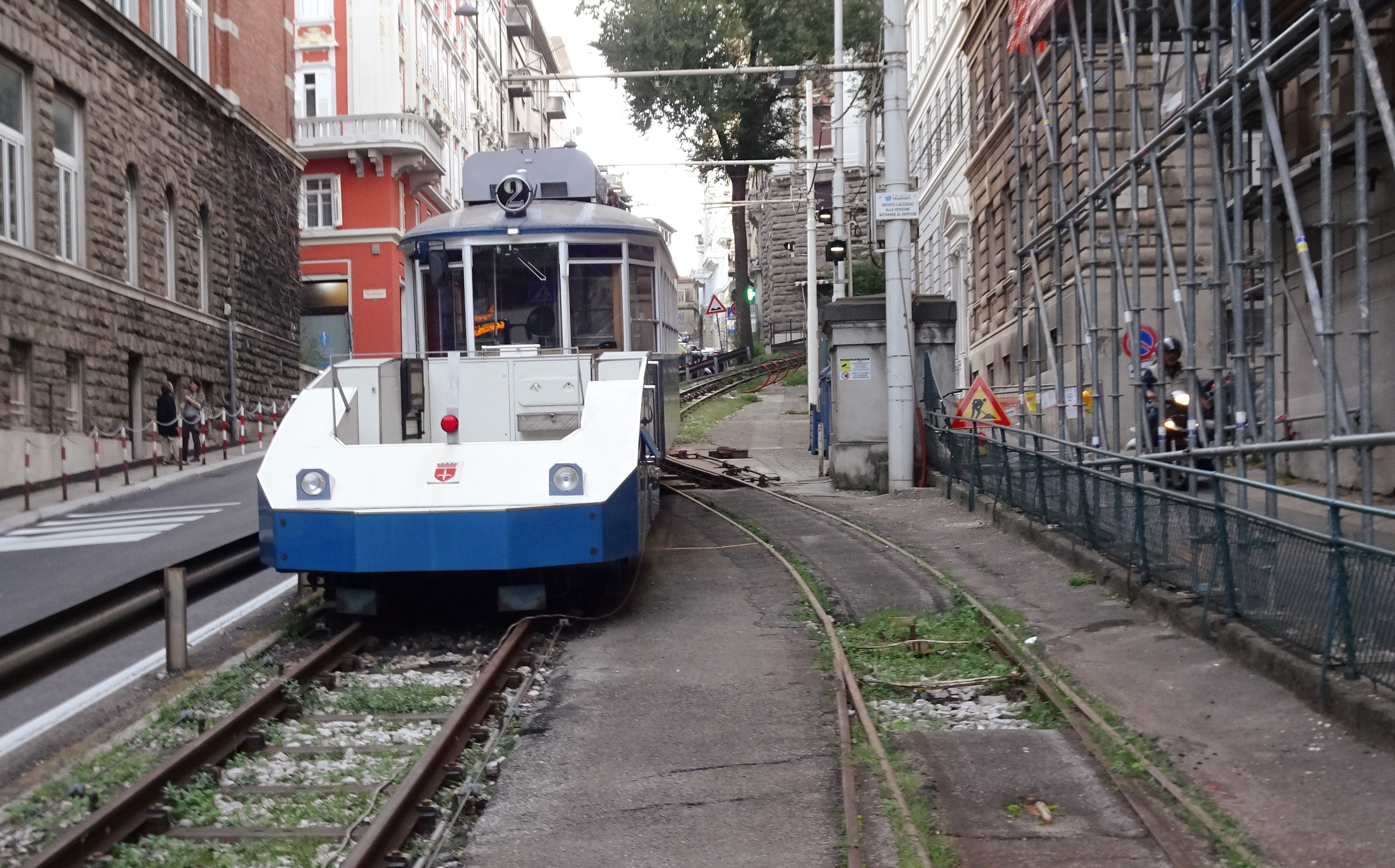
One of the cars was parked in the lower part of Via Commerciale waiting for the line to reopen.

The two damaged cars were repaired by early 2017, and in December 2017 the regional council granted €3 million to restore the tramway.

Throughout the years, two of the cars were in the open air in the depot yard, while a third remained abandoned in the street in Trieste where the dummy is engaged. A platform and turning circle for the bus 2 and 2/ have been constructed at Villa Opicina station. The bus pauses at the tram depot to allow a ticket to be purchased at the bar adjacent to the depot. There were reports of test runs in July and November 2022.

=== 2025: Reopening and another closure ===
On 18 December 2024, testing began with trams running without passengers "on a trial basis".. The tram resumed operations on 1 February 2025, but failed again in October 2025. This has resulted in further maintenance work until summer 2026.

== Route ==
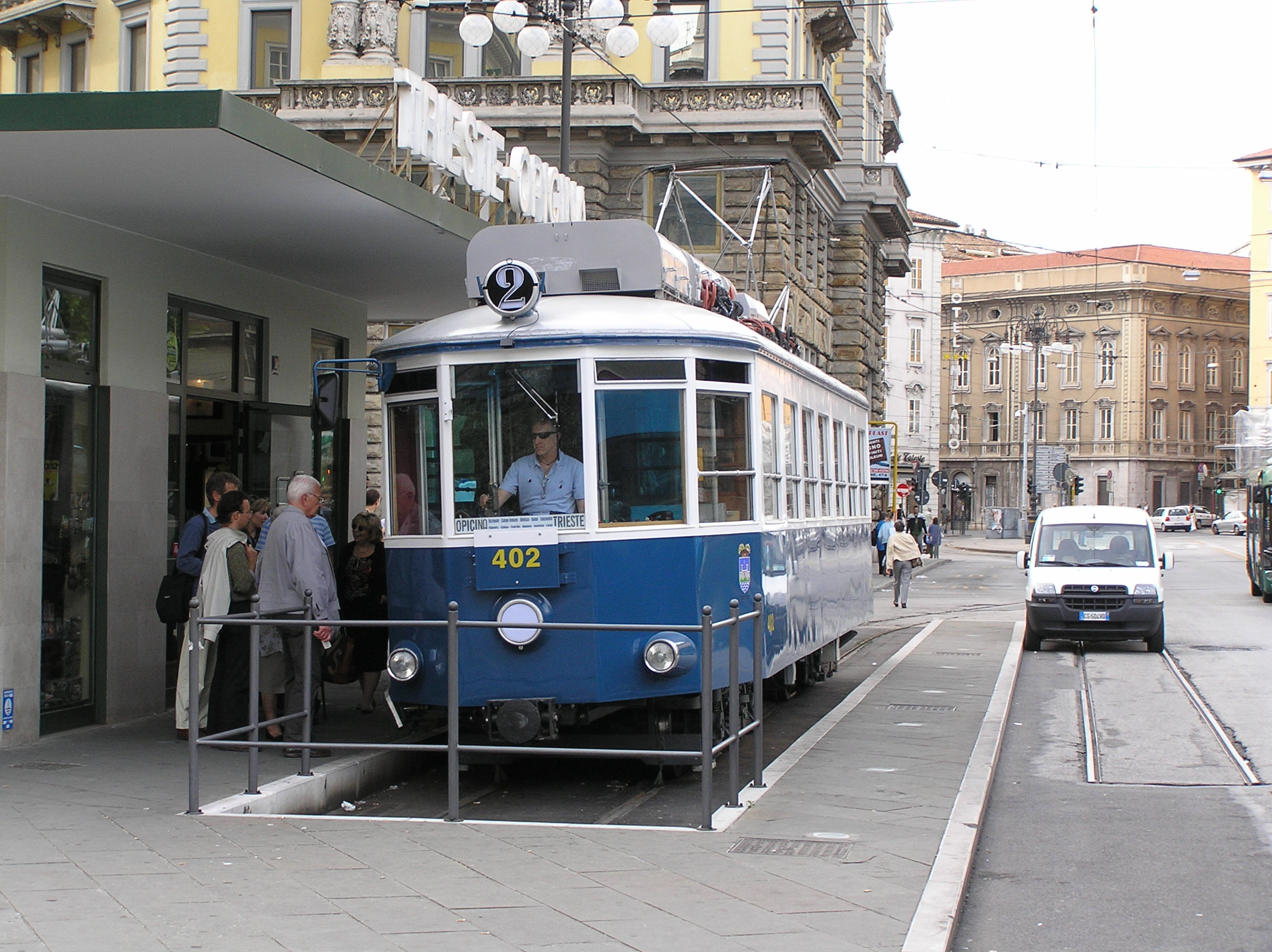
Tramcar 402 at the recently rearranged Piazza Oberdan terminus.

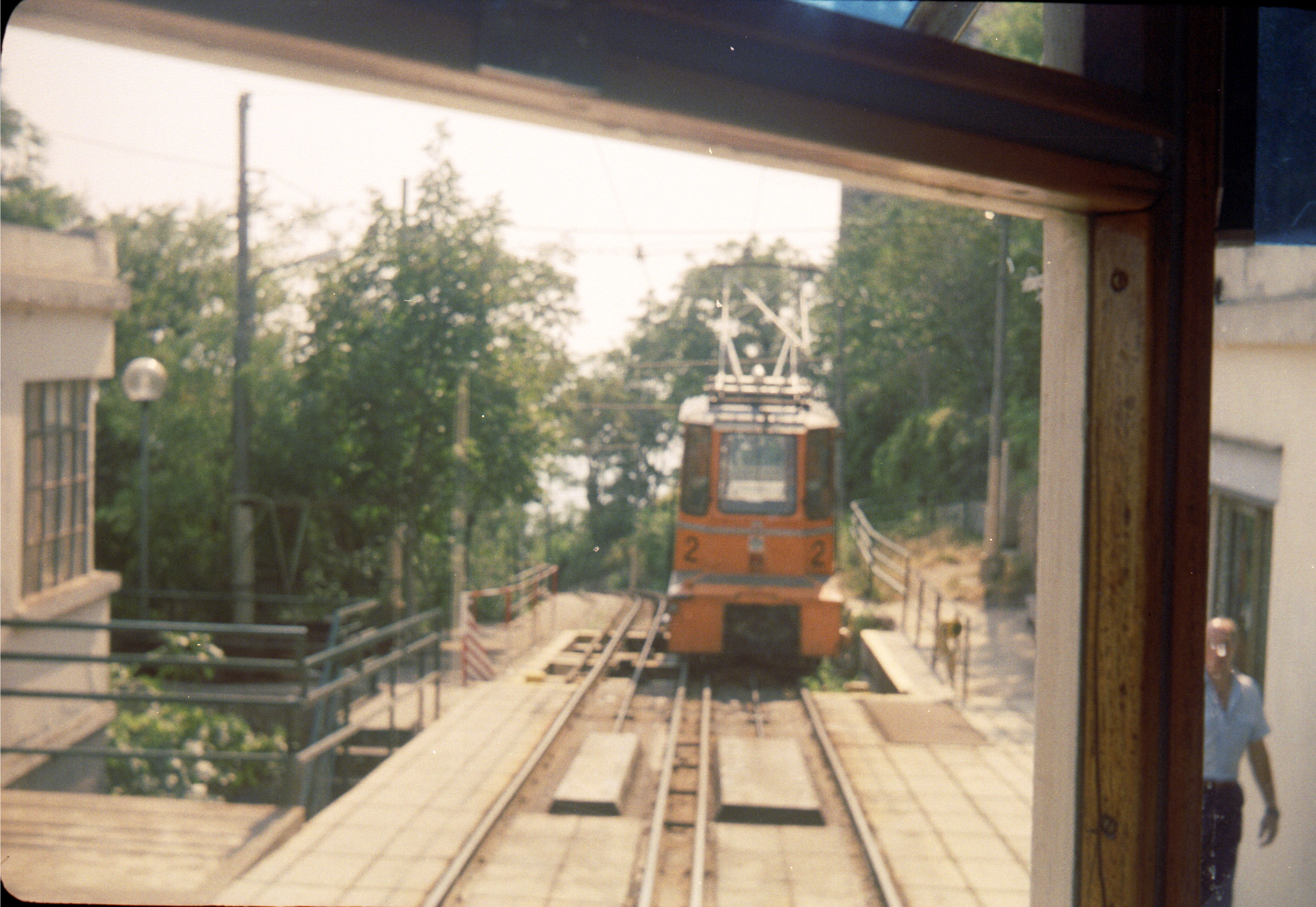
The top of the cable section at Vetta Scorcola, showing the very closely spaced double track, haulage cables and a second-generation cable tractor.

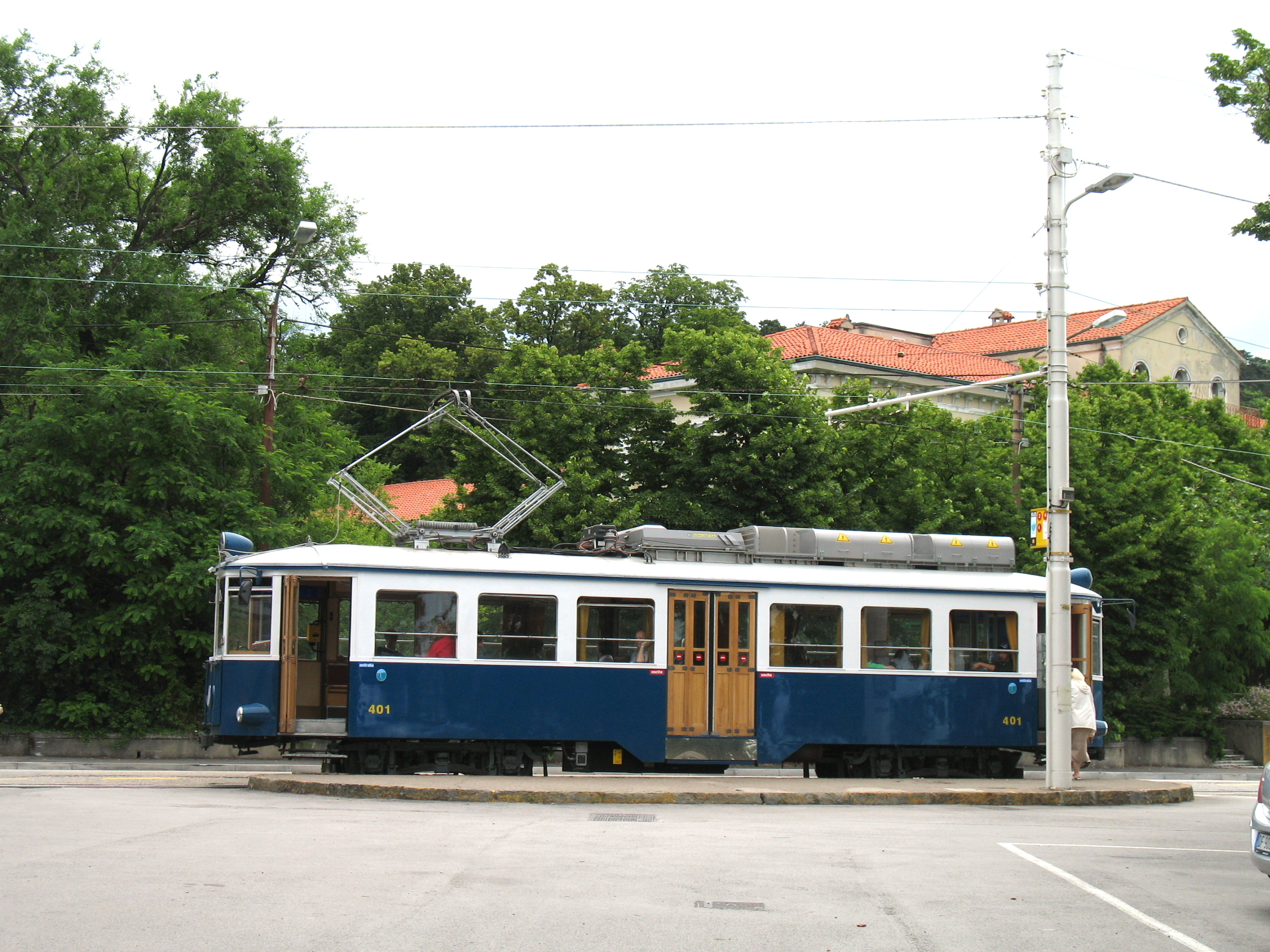
Car 401 at Obelisco on the upper section of the tramway.

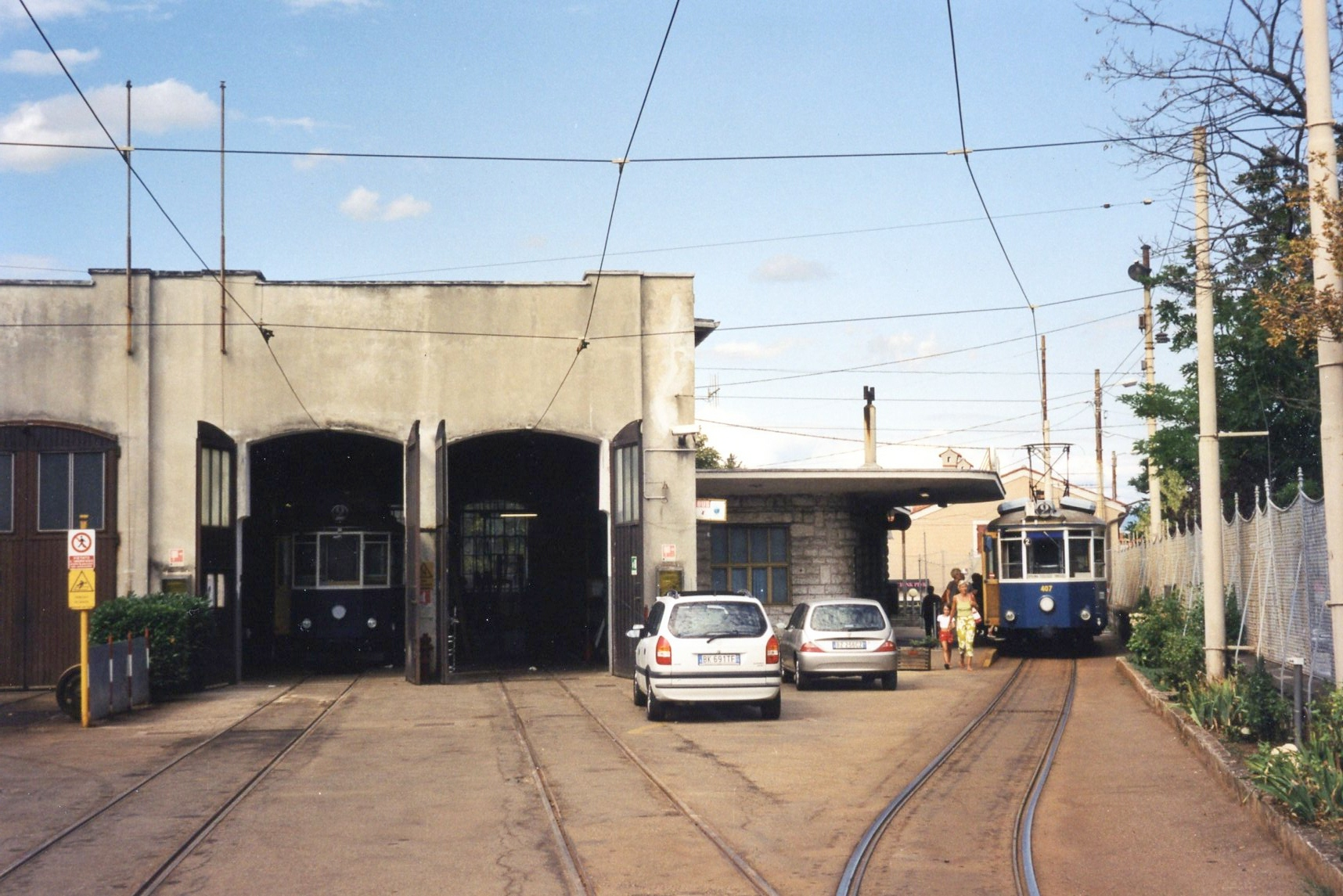
Opicina tram depot, 29 July 2003

=== Description ===
The line has a total length of 5.2 km (3.2 mi), and climbs from just 3 metres (9.8 ft) above sea level in Trieste to a height of 329 metres (1,079 ft) in Opicina. The line is of 1,000 mm (3 ft 3 3/8 in) metre gauge, and is single-tracked with eleven intermediate stops and four passing loops. The terminus in Piazza Oberdan has two tracks, although only one is normally used. Between Piazza Oberdan and Piazza Scorcola, a distance of some 400 metres (1,312 ft), the line runs in the street along the Via Martiri Della Libertà through a built-up urban area.

From Piazza Scorcola to Vetta Scorcola, a distance of 869 metres (2,851 ft), the funicular section runs on its own right of way. The cable-hauled section is 799 metres (2,621 ft) long and climbs a vertical distance of 160 metres (525 ft) with a maximum gradient of 26%. At its foot is a short stub siding that permits the cable tractor to be parked off the running-line. In the middle of the funicular section, at Romagna, is the first passing-loop, used in normal service. Whilst the line below the loop is single track, the final 120 metres or so of the loop below Vetta Scorcola is laid as very closely spaced double track, allowing each cable tractor to use a different track.

The longer upper section, from Vetta Scorcola to Villa Opicina, is mostly on roadside reservation or private right-of-way in open rural country. There are three passing-loops on this section, although only the one at Conconello is used in normal service, with the loops at Cologna Campo Sportivo and Campo Romano used only if extra services are running. The terminus at Villa Opicina is flanked by a five track depot.

=== Services ===
The line forms part of the network of Trieste Trasporti, the public transport provider for Trieste, and is line 2 of that company's system. When running, services are operated every 20 minutes from early morning (07:00) to early evening (20:00).

=== Stops ===
From the Trieste end of the line, the line serves stops at:

- Piazza Oberdan (terminus)
- Piazza Scorcola
- Sant'Anastasio
- Romagna
- Vetta Scorcola
- Cologna Campo Sportivo
- Cologna Chiesetta
- Conconello
- Banne
- Obelisco
- Campo Romano
- Via Nazionale
- Villa Opicina (terminus)

== Equipment ==
=== Tramcars ===
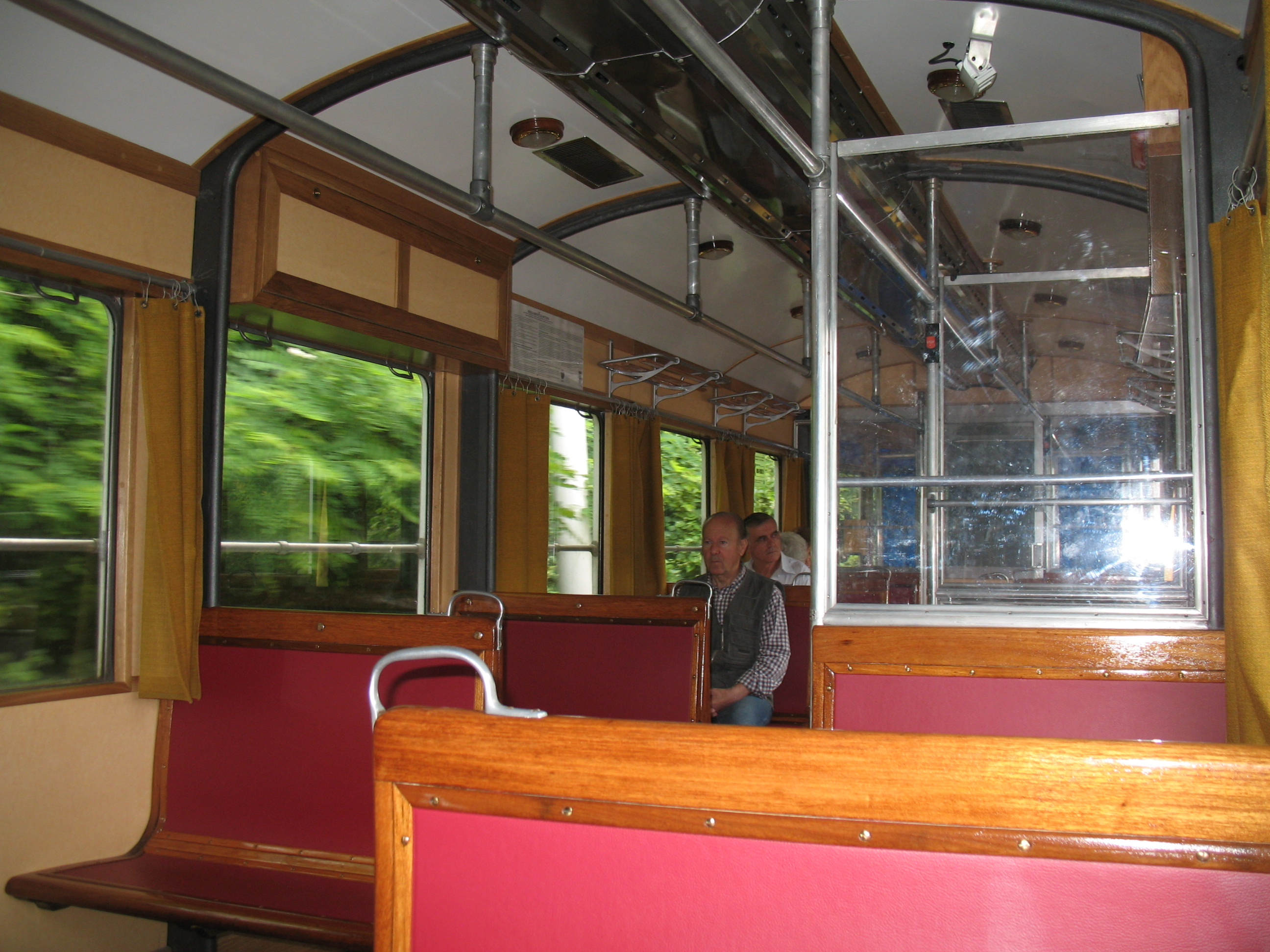
Interior of a service car.

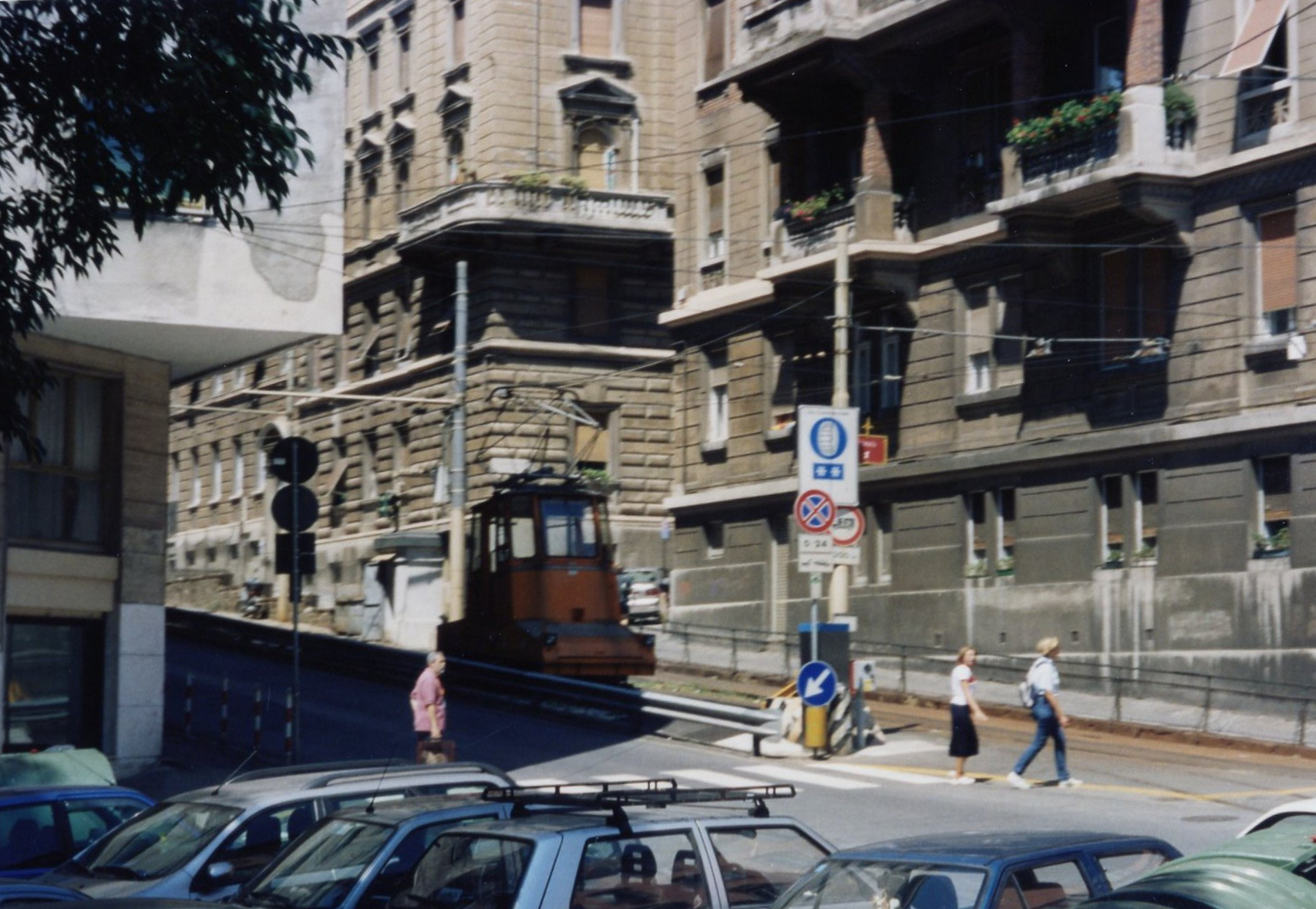
Older generation cable tractor waiting for a tram to Opicina at Piazza Casali, Trieste, 29 July 2003

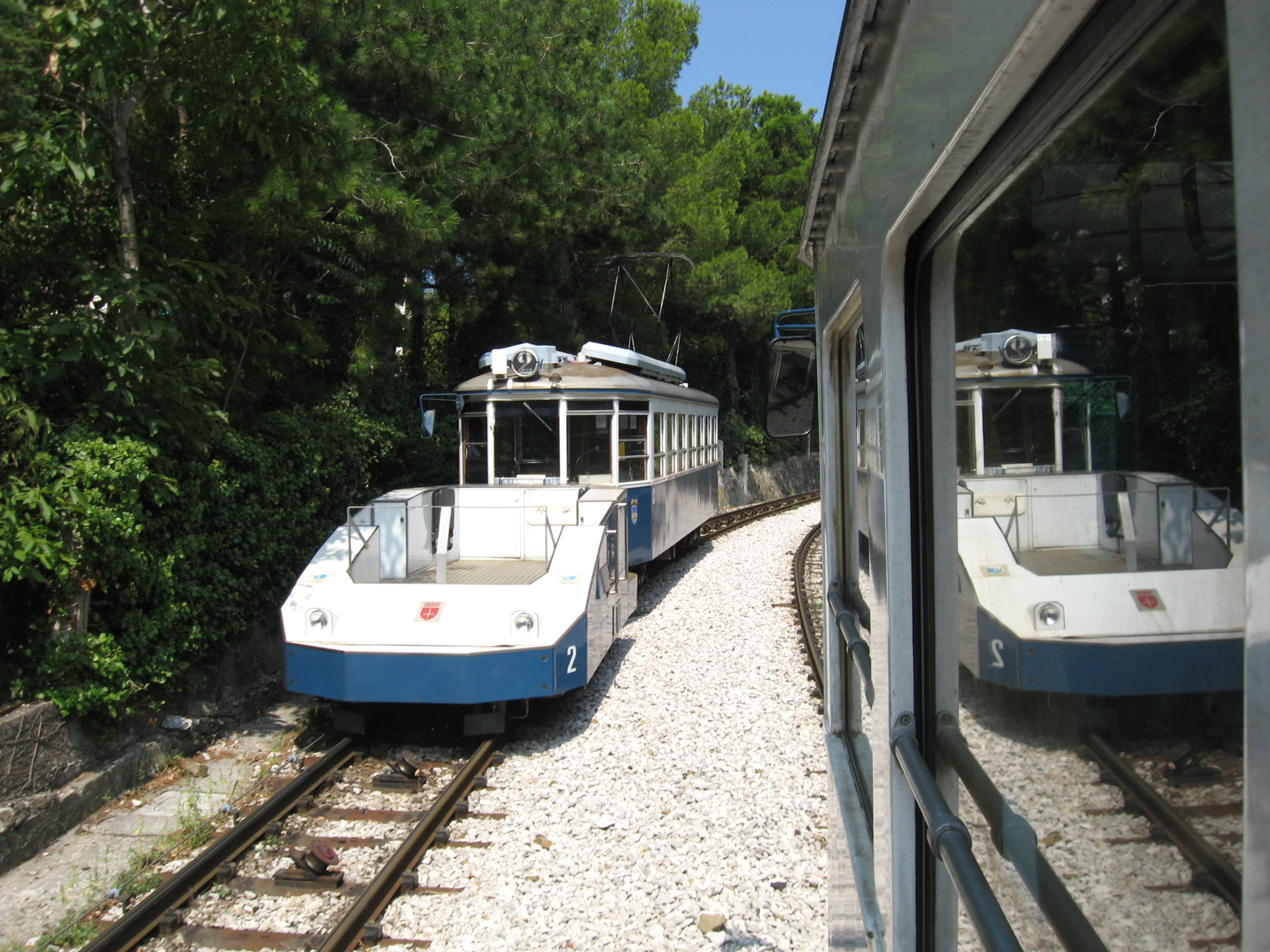
One of the latest generation of cable tractors, braking a descending tramcar.

The line is operated by six steel-bodied four-axle electric tramcars numbered 401-402 and 404–407. Cars 401-405 were built in 1935 by Officine Meccaniche Stanga with Tecnomasio Italiano Brown Boveri electrical components. Cars 406-407 were built in 1942 by the same companies to a similar design, although war-time shortages resulted in a more basic interior and different window detail. Car 403 was subsequently destroyed in an accident on 28 November 1975.

The cars take electricity from a 550 Volts DC overhead line. Each car is 13.37 metres (43.9 ft) long, 2.5 metres (8.2 ft) wide and 3.45 metres (11.3 ft) high, with 50 seats and a total carrying capacity of 120 passengers. They have four 25 kW (34 hp) motors, giving a maximum speed of 35 km/h (22 mph), and are equipped for rheostatic braking, in addition to air brakes, electro-magnetic track brakes and hand brakes.

Two of the original wooden-bodied four-wheel tramcars still exist. The original car 1 was built in 1902, at Graz in Austria, by Grazer Waggonfabrik with electrical components from Österreichische Union-Elektrizitätsgesellschaft. On the arrival of cars 401–407, it was converted into a works car numbered 411. In 1992 it was restored to its original condition and sees occasional service as a museum car. Car 6 has also survived and been recently restored, having been displayed as a static exhibit at the railway museum in Trieste Campo Marzio station.

=== Cable tractors ===
On the funicular section of the line, the tramcars are pushed uphill and braked downhill by cable tractors, also known as cable dummies or, in Italian, carro scudo. These vehicles are permanently attached to the haulage cable. They are not coupled to the tramcars; gravity holds the lower end of the tramcar against the upper end of the cable tractor. There have been three generations of cable tractors on the line.

The first generation of cable tractors was introduced in 1928, and had 4.7-metre (15 ft) long box-shaped bodies. These cars were replaced in 1978 by two new vehicles, manufactured by Fuji Electric. These had a very different appearance, with only a short control cabin in the centre of the 4.98-metre (16.3 ft) long chassis. Both these first two generations of cable tractor were operated by their own driver, separately from the driver of the tramcar.

In 2005, a third generation of unmanned cable tractors was introduced. These tractors are operated remotely by the drivers of the tramcars. Without the need for a cabin to accommodate a driver, these new cable tractors are low-profile vehicles, and thus do not obstruct the vision of the tramcar driver or the passengers when running downhill with the tractor leading.

== See also ==
- List of funicular railways
- Trolleybuses in Trieste
- Trams in Trieste
