= Trolleybuses in Trieste =

Trieste trolleybus system
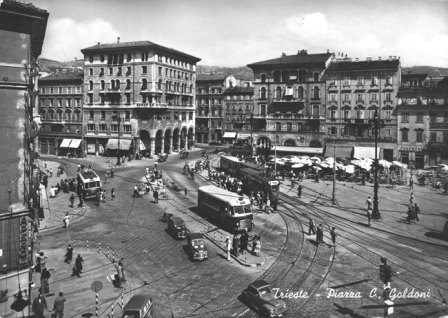
- Trieste, Goldoni Square in 1951 (on the left, trolleybus "Garavini" on route A)

Operation
- Locale: Trieste, Friuli-Venezia Giulia, Italy
- Open: 1935
- Close: 1975
- Owner: Municipality of Trieste
- Operator: A.C.E.G.A.T.

Infrastructure
- Electrification: 600 V a.c.
- Depots: 2 (Broletto and San Sabba)

Trieste's trolleybus system was operational from 1935 until 1975.

== History ==
The first trolleybus route in Trieste, “la linea dei colli” (the hills route), was inaugurated in 1935 between the central Goldoni Square and Campo Marzio, a neighborhood in the south of the city near the new commercial port.

Before World War II., two more routes were created. In 1940 these routes were operational:

- 4 Piazza Goldoni - Piazza Foraggi
- 10 Piazza Ciano – San Cilino
- 12 Piazza Goldoni - Campo Marzio

In the early 1950s, under the Allied Military Government of Free Territory of Trieste (1945-1954), the municipal transportation authority (A.C.E.G.A.T.) decided to replace the tramway with new trolleybus lines. More over, in 1952 the interurban line Trieste-Muggia began operation (Muggia is a little town just in the border with the "B Zone", at that time controlled by Yugoslavia). The line was over 6 miles long, and some of it was in a picturesque scenery next to the meridional shore of the Trieste's Gulf. The service between Trieste and Muggia until this time was operated by steamboats.

The trolleybus network began to shrink in 1958, when the night-time lines were cancelled. Even though route 21 opened in 1960, it was closed only 9 months later. In the late 1960s, the other routes were progressively being replaced by bus lines. The last trolleybus ran in Trieste in 1975 on route 19 (Stazione Centrale - Via Flavia).

Overhead wiring was dismantled between 1975 and 1982. Some vehicles were scrapped, while others were sold to the Salerno transportation authority (A.T.A.C.S.).

== Routes ==
(in order of opening)

Route	Initial itinerary	Date Opened	Notes	Date Closed	Final itinerary
12	Piazza Goldoni - Campo Marzio	1935	Renamed "A" in 1946, renamed "15" in 1952	1968	Piazza San Giovanni - Campo Marzio
10	Piazza Ciano - San Cilino	1938	Replaced tramway "10", renamed "B" in 1946, renamed "17" in 1952	1968	Piazza della Borsa - San Cilino
4	Piazza Goldoni - Piazza Foraggi	1938	Replaced tramway "4", renamed "C" in 1946, renamed "18" in 1952	1963	Via Verdi - Via Cumano
D	Portici di Chiozza - via Flavia	1949	Renamed "19" in 1952	1975	Stazione Centrale - Via Flavia
1	Stazione Centrale - Valmaura	1952	Replaced tramway "1"	1973	Stazione Centrale - Via Doda
5	Roiano - Piazza Perugino	1952	Replaced tramway "5"	1972	unchanged
10	Via Verdi - Valmaura	1954		1972	Piazza della Borsa - Valmaura
11	Piazza della Borsa - Rozzol	1952	Replaced tramway "11"	1970	unchanged
16	Piazza Goldoni - Campi Elisi	1952		1968	Piazza San Giovanni - Campi Elisi
20	Largo Barriera Vecchia - Muggia	1952	Interurban line	1972	unchanged
21	Largo Barriera Vecchia - Borgo San Sergio	1960	On duty only up to Via Flavia	1961	unchanged
33	Piazza Goldoni - Rozzol	1952	Night service only (1a.m. - 5a.m.)	1958	unchanged
34	Piazza Goldoni - Via Flavia	1952	Night service only(1a.m. - 5a.m.)	1958	unchanged

- When day-time routes were closed, bus lines with the same number took their place

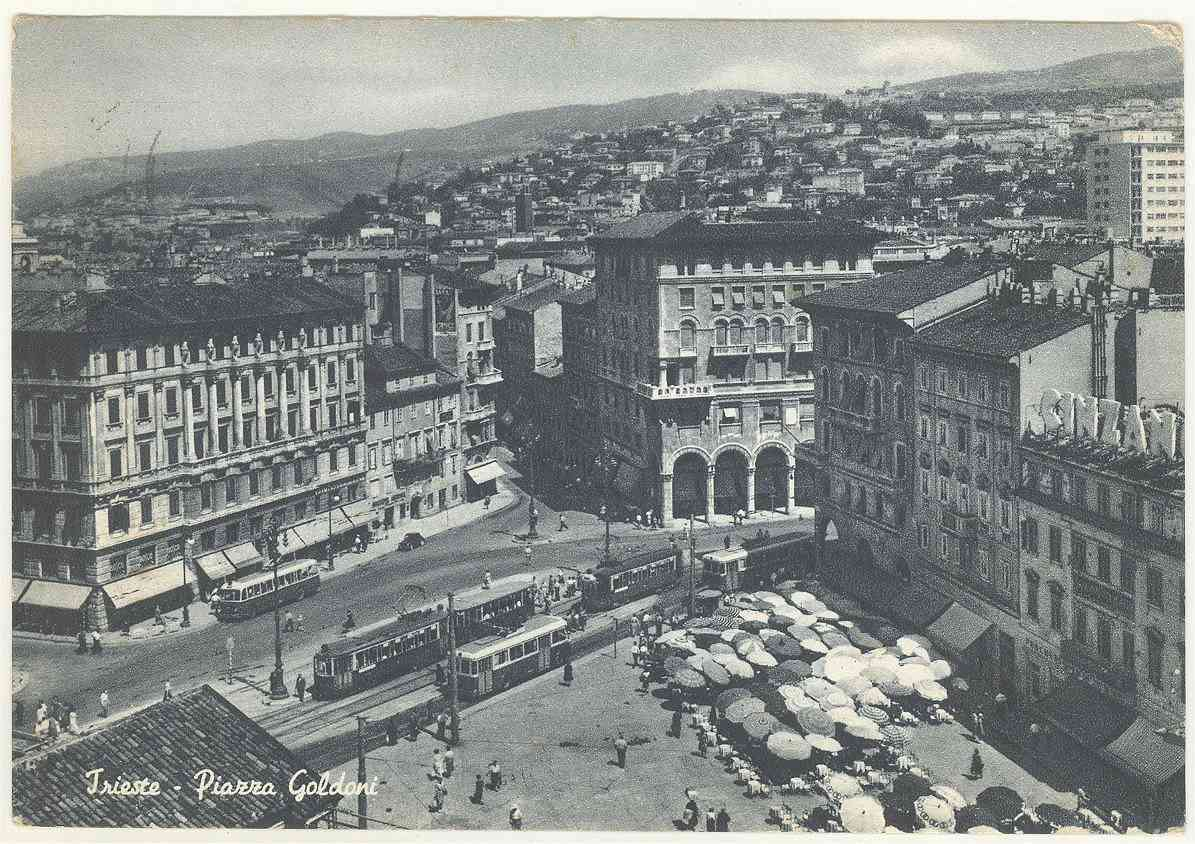

Trieste, Goldoni Square in the 1950s. From the left, an Alfa Romeo 800 Garavini (611-620 batch) on route 15, a tram Stanga (401-428 batch) with trailer on route 9, a tram Stanga (429-448 batch) on route 3, two Alfa Romeo 140, probably on routes 5 and 11

== Fleet ==
(in order of registration)

Id. no.	Year	Chassis	Body	Electric equipment	Notes
601 - 605	1935	OM	Miani & Silvestri	Marelli	2-axles, scrapped in 1950s
606 - 610	1938	Alfa Romeo 85AF	Macchi	Marelli	2-axles, scrapped in 1963
611 - 620	1941	Alfa Romeo 800AF	Garavini	Marelli	2-axles, scrapped in 1968
701 - 707	1949	Alfa Romeo 140AF	SIAI Marchetti	Marelli	3-axles, 125 HP powered, max capab.103, scrapped in 1968
708, 709	1951	Fiat 672F/212	Stanga	TIBB	3-axles, scrapped in 1968
710 - 727	1951	Alfa Romeo 140AF	Stanga	TIBB	3-axles, 156 HP powered, max capab.101, scrapped in 1973-1975, save 725 sold to Salerno in 1972
621 - 626	1952	Alfa Romeo 900AF	CRDA	TIBB	2-axles, 156 HP powered, sold to Salerno in 1971
728 - 758	1952-1956	Alfa Romeo 140AF	CRDA	TIBB	3-axles, 156 HP powered, max capab.101, some scrapped in 1975, 19 sold to Salerno in 1973

== See also ==
- List of trolleybus systems in Italy
- Trams in Trieste
- Trieste-Opicina Tramway
