= Trams in Trieste =

Trieste tramway network
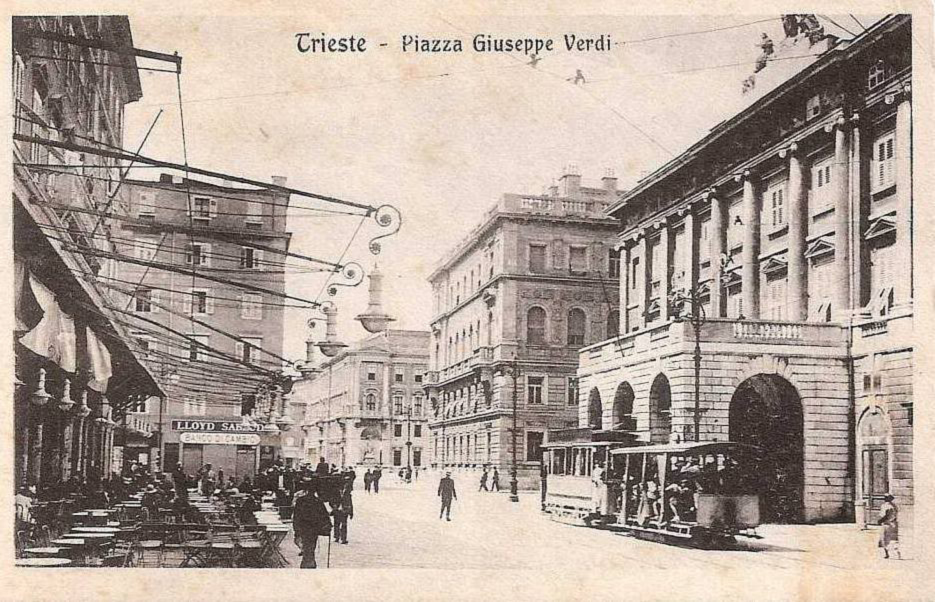
- Trieste, Giuseppe Verdi Square in early 1900

Operation
- Locale: Trieste, Friuli-Venezia Giulia, Italy

Statistics
Horsecar era: 1876–ca. 1914
- Routes: 7 (1899)
- Operator: S.T.T.
- Track gauge: 1,445 mm (4 ft 8 7/8 in)
- Propulsion system: Horse
- Depot: 1 (Margherita)
Electric era: since 1900–1970
- Routes: 11 (1928)
- Operators: S.T.T., Tranvie Comunali, A.C.E.G.A.T.
- Track gauge: 1,445 mm (4 ft 8 7/8 in)
- Propulsion system: Electric
- Electrification: 600 Volts DC
- Depots: 3 (Margherita, San Sabba, San Giovanni)
- Stock: max 124 cars + 60 trailers
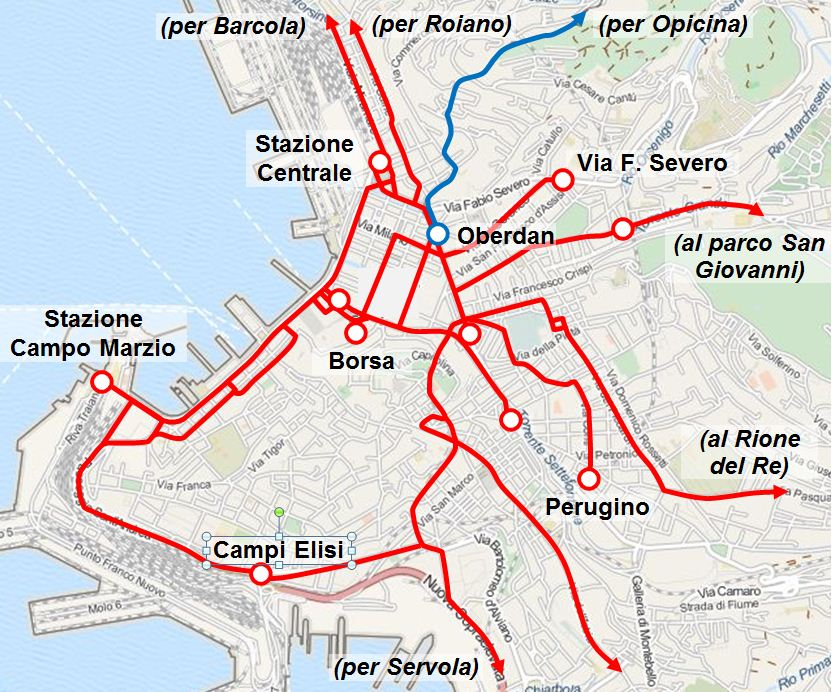
- Tram routes in 1928

Trieste's urban tramway system was operational from 1876 until 1970.

== History ==
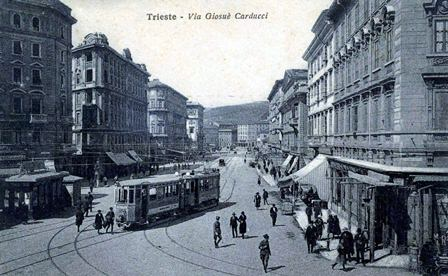
Carducci Street

=== The horse-drawn network ===
After the creation of the first horse-drawn omnibus routes in 1860, mostly by the firm "Cimadori", the first horse-drawn tram followed in 1876, organized by “Società Triestina Tranway (STT)”, a Belgian-owned society, also known as “Triester Tramway Gesellschaft” or “Societé de Tramways de Trieste”. The first route, the “via Torrente-corsia Stadion-Boschetto” route, was inaugurated on March 30, 1876. In the later 1800s, the horse-drawn tram network was significantly increased. In 1900, its maximum expansion, the following routes were in service:

- Central RR Station (Südbahnhof)-Boschetto
- Central RR Station (Südbahnhof)-Sant'Andrea
- route to Barcola
- route to Barriera Vecchia
- route to Giuseppina Square
- route to Punto Franco
- route to Bagno Fontana

=== Electrical operations begin ===
The STT, in competition with other proposers, won a public tender to realize a network of electric trams in Trieste based on “Sprague system”, collecting electricity from overhead wires. The gauge of the track was of 1445 mm (4 ft, 8 7/8 in); the electricity supply was 600 V direct-current. Consequently, on October 3, 1900, the first route between Barcola (a seaside resort near the famous Miramar Castle of Maximilian of Austria) and Boschetto (a densely populated district of Trieste) was inaugurated: curiously, almost of the same itinerary of the first horse-drawn tramway.

Fourteen years after, at the onset of the First World War, the STT managed the following routes:

Electric lines:

- Boschetto – Servola
- Via Kandler – Sant'Andrea (K.K.st.B. Station)
- Barcola – Piazza Tommaseo
- Roiano – Via Sette Fontane
- Circle line

Horse-drawn line:

- Stazione Meridionale (Suedbahn Station) – Porto Vecchio

The routes were marked only by colored schedules with name of destination, with no number or letter; different colors identified the different routes. This was done to allow the illiterate to be able to read the map. Every car carried a “train number”, that distinguished any vehicle on the same route (this system – by little dox-matrix indicators – is still valid today, on the buses of “Trieste Trasporti”).

=== The Municipality enters tramway business ===
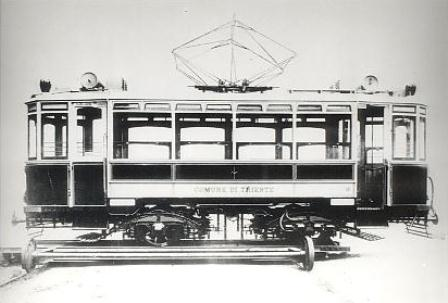
"Graz" type 1-12 batch (than 167-178)

Verify the success obtained by electric trams, the Municipality of Trieste decided to realise and to manage directly further routes, but the licensee STT taken a legal action in order to stand up for oneself. The Supreme Court of Vienna (until 1918, Trieste was part of the Austrian-Hungarian Empire), however, issued on May 19, 1910 a sentence in favour of Municipality. Therefore, on June 7, 1913 got under way the new route Piazza Goldoni-San Sabba, identified by the number “1” and managed directly by Municipality.:

Finished the World War I as a consequence of Rapallo Treaty (November 1920), Trieste became an Italian town. The new Administration of the Municipality, in order to raise the decent profit resulting from public transportation, decided to take it upon itself the whole net of STT, starting from 1921. Any route was enumerated.

The last route, the "11", opened on December 23, 1928, and ran from the center of the town to “Rion del Re”, a new neighborhood built in the hills in the south-east of Trieste. At the same date, the network reached to the maximum extension, with 124 trams and 86 trailers in service and with 11 routes covered about 45 km (28 miles):

- 1 - San Sabba-San Giacomo-Stazione Centrale
- 2 - Boschetto-Campo Marzio-Servola
- 3 - Boschetto- Stazione Campo Marzio
- 4 - Piazza Garibaldi-Campo Marzio-Arsenale
- 5 - Piazza Perugino-Roiano
- 6 - Piazza Goldoni-Barcola
- 7 - Boschetto-Stazione Centrale
- 8 - Stazione Centrale-Campo Marzio
- 9 - S.Giovanni-Campi Elisi
- 10 - Via Economo-Via Fabio Severo
- 11 - Piazza Verdi-Rion del Re

In 1934 the Municipality decided to unify the public utilities and create the A.C.E.G.A.T., acronym that means “Council Society for Electricity, Gas, Water and Tramway”. At the same time, 48 modern trams (401-448 batches) with high capacity entered in service, in place of the 1900 little trams (101-160 batch) that were retired.

=== Decline ===
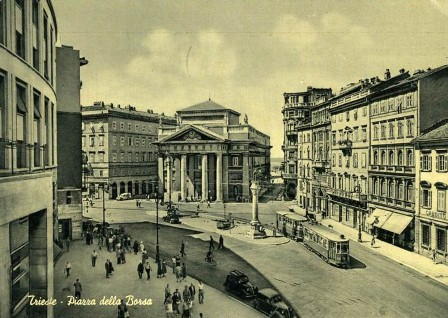
Borsa Square, tram Stanga (401-428) and trailer on route 9

The decline of the trams quietly began in 1935, with the conversion of the route “10” into a bus line, and later into a trolleybus line. Before World War II, the transportation network of A.C.E.G.A.T. consisted of nine tram routes and three trolleybus routes, plus occasional services carried out by buses.

The war, even with its air raids, hardly damaged plants and most of the rolling stock of the A.C.E.G.A.T. remained intact. In June 1945, Trieste was occupied by allied troops that remained there for nine years and created the Free Territory of Trieste. During the refurbishment of the tramway system, many services were conducted by equipped Allied Army lorries (trucks).

The tram, though having reached a good level of quality, was less economic than the trolleybus or motor bus and showed high-grade of performance only on level lines, with flowing itineraries and a high number of passengers; that being so, A.C.E.G.A.T. decided to modified the “mix” between trams and trolleybus, increasing decisively the latter. Around 1952, routes "1", "5", and "11" were converted into trolleybus routes; route "4" was terminated; and routes "6" and "7" were merged. Two night services were created ("31" and "32").

After the “Trolleybus Conversion”, the tram system consisted of the following routes:

- 2 – Boschetto-Servola
- 3 - San Giovanni-Campo Marzio
- 6 - San Giovanni-Barcola
- 8 - Roiano-Campo Marzio
- 9 - San Giovanni-Campi Elisi
- 31 - San Giovanni-Piazza Goldoni-Servola (only overnight service)
- 32 - Barcola-Piazza Goldoni-Campo Marzio (only overnight service)

Nearly all of the two-axle trams and countless trailers were scrapped. In the summer time, as Trieste is a seaside resort, the route “6” (piazza Goldoni - Barcola) was created and the routes “3” and “8” took a detour to the beach resorts.

In Italy, in the early 1960s, the economic situation of the public transportation authorities began to fail. Municipalities were coerced to fill the balances of the transportation companies that grew poorer year after year. In order to significantly reduce the costs, it was considered fit to replace the conductors with automatic ticket machines: for many factors, A.C.E.G.A.T. considered these machines unfitting with tram and trolleybus operations. Therefore, the Municipality decided to convert the entire network to bus operations within 1970. In the evening of March 31, 1970, the last urban tram ran in Trieste on route “9”.

The last trolleybus ran in 1975. On July 1, 1977 A.C.E.G.A.T. merged into “Azienda Consorziale Trasporti” and ceased to exist. Today in Trieste, the “Trenovia di Opicina”, a peculiar 1902 extra-urban tram (see map), is the only remaining relic of Trieste's tram network.

== Rolling stock ==
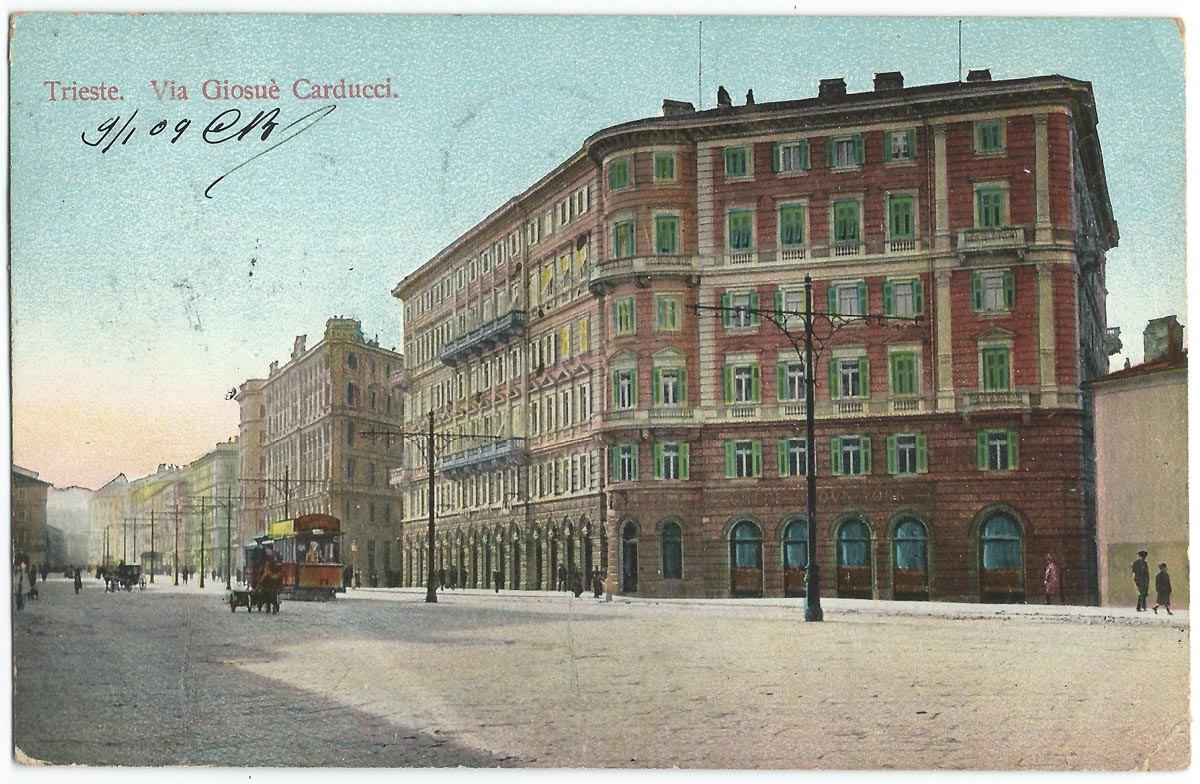
1909, Tram Union, batch 101-160

=== Trailers ===
Fleet no.	Axles	Year	Builder	Notes
1÷29	2	1900		open trailers, many former horse-drawn, scrapped in 1930s-1940s
31÷43	2	1900		closed trailers, many former horse-drawn, scrapped in 1930s-1940s
45÷52	2	1912	Grazer Waggonfabrik	original equipment of “Servizio Comunale” as 501-508, scrapped in the later 1960s
53÷62	2	1927	Officine di Savigliano	scrapped in the later 1960s
63÷70	2	1927	Officine Casaralta	scrapped in the later 1960s
71÷89	2	1900		closed trailers, many former horse-drawn, scrapped in 1930s-1940s

=== Trams ===
Fleet no.	Axles	Year	Builder	Elec. equipment	Notes
101÷160	2	1900	Union El. Ges. Wien	AEG Berlin	original equipment of STT, scrapped in the 1930s-1940s
161÷166	2	1925	Officine Bagnara	CGE	scrapped in the later 1950s
167÷178	2	1912	Grazer Waggonfabrik	Union El. Ges. Wien	original equipment of “Servizio Comunale” as 1-12, scrapped in the later 1950s
179÷200	2	1927	Officine di Savigliano	CGE	scrapped in the later 1950s, 191 and 194 left as tool cars (194 preserved at Railways Museum of Trieste Campo Marzio)
201÷224	2	1927	Officine Casaralta	CGE	scrapped in the later 1950s
401÷408	4	1933	Stanga	TIBB	scrapped in the early 1970s
409÷428	4	1934	Stanga	TIBB	scrapped in the early 1970s, 427 preserved at Railways Museum of Trieste Campo Marzio
429÷448	4	1938	Stanga	TIBB	scrapped in the early 1970s, 442 preserved at Railways Museum of Trieste Campo Marzio and 6 units (443-448) transferred over to STEFER-Rome in the early 1960s (446 is now preserved in Trieste and 447 in Turin)

== Gallery ==
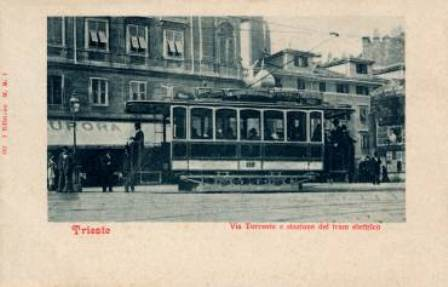
Torrente St. (now via Carducci) in a vintage postcard, Tram Union (101-160 batch)

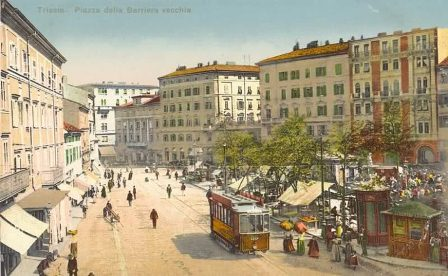
Barriera Vecchia Sq. (now piazza Garibaldi) in a vintage postcard, Tram Union (101-160 batch)

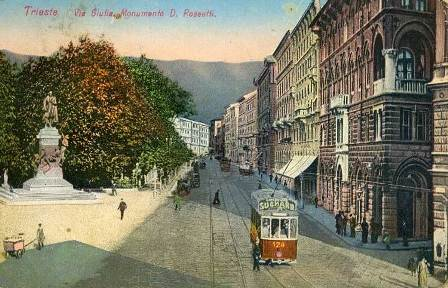
Giulia Street in a vintage postcard, Tram Union (101-160 batch)

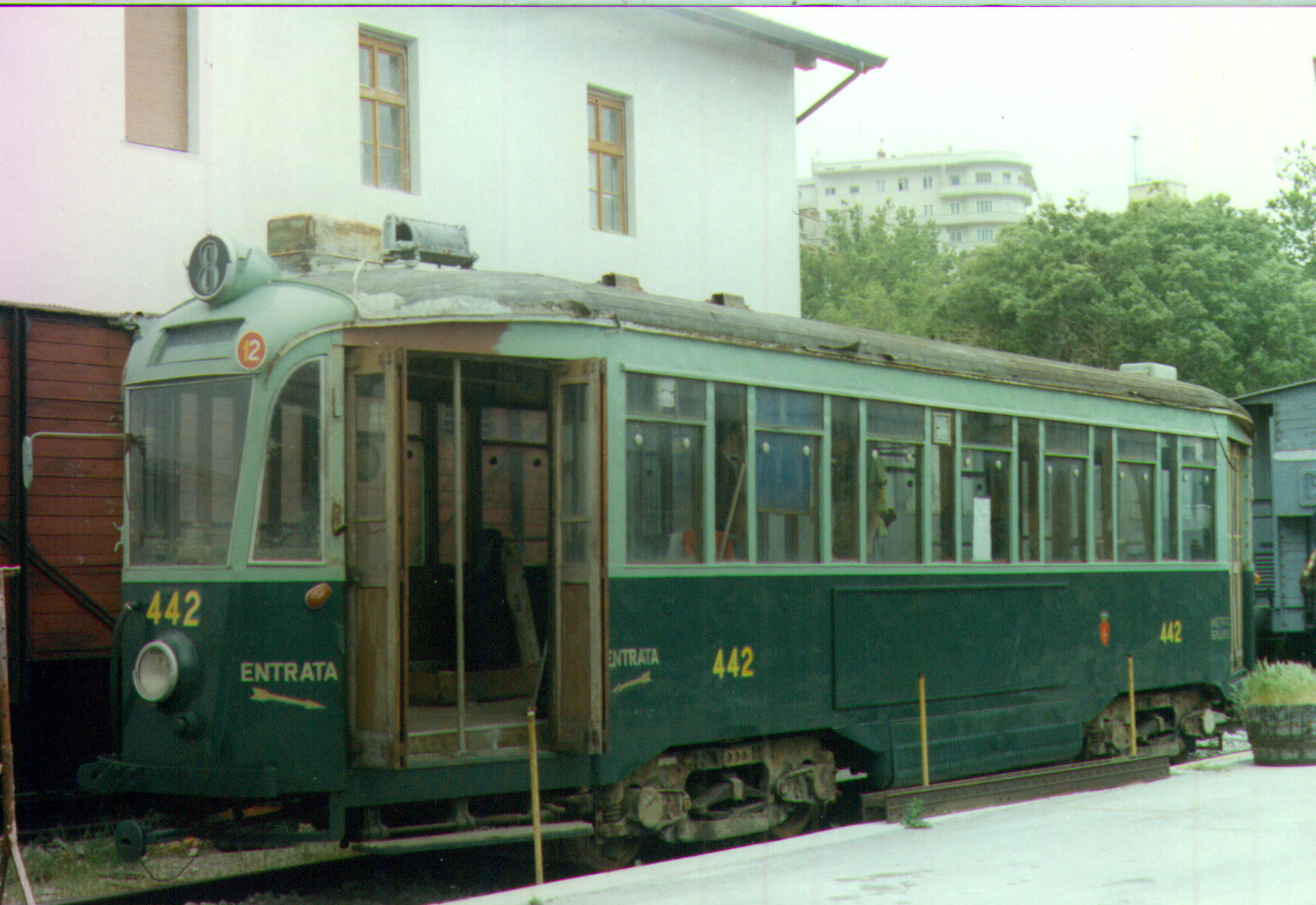
Tram 442 (a 3rd series “Stanga”) at Railways Museum of Trieste Campo Marzio

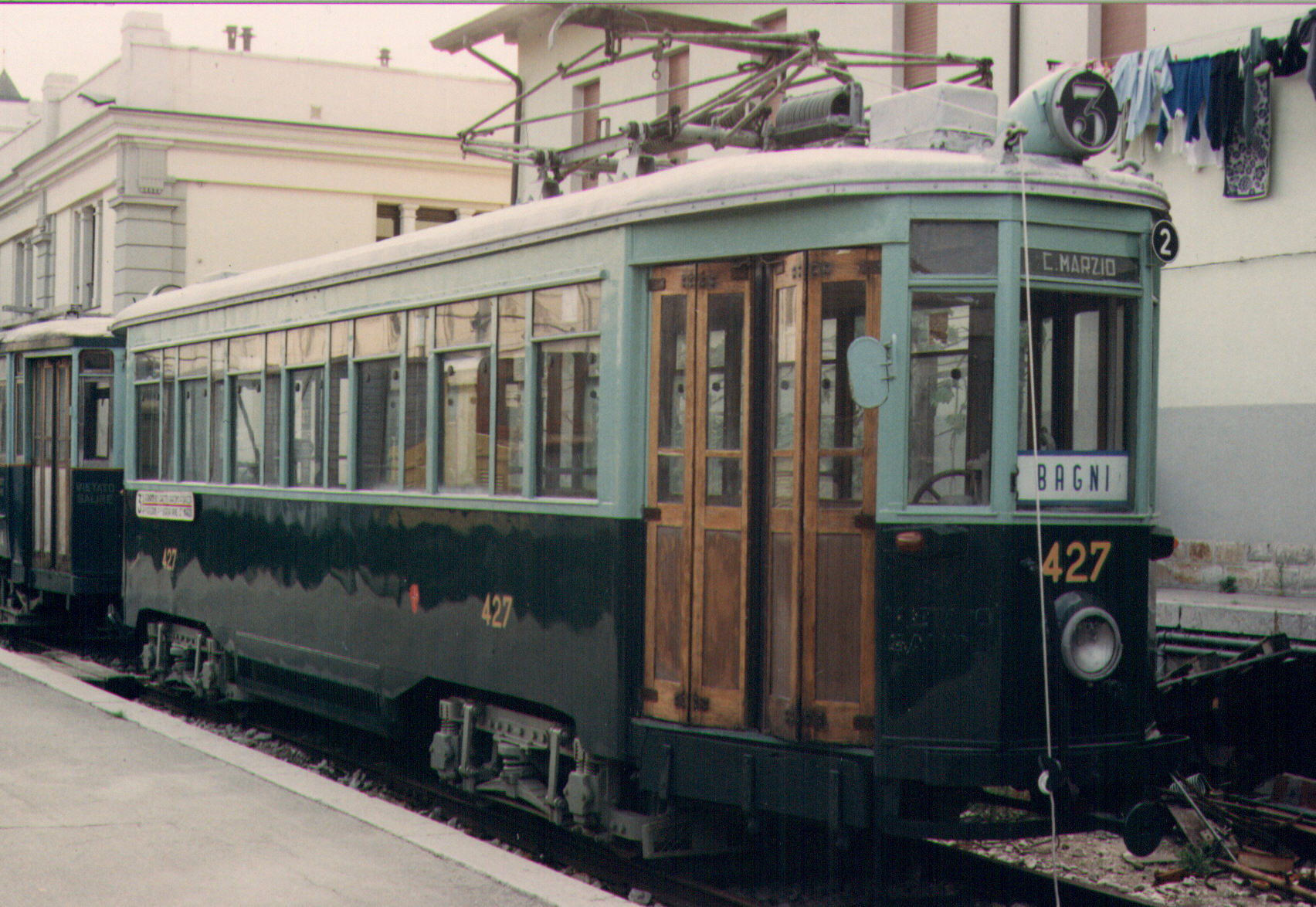
Tram 427 (a 2nd series “Stanga”) at Railways Museum of Trieste Campo Marzio

== Bibliography ==
- Giorgio Grisilla, Andrea Di Matteo, "Trieste e i suoi tram" article published in "I Treni" n. 222, ETR Editrice, Salò (BS), January 2001, pp. 29–33.
- Guido Botteri (edited by), "I trasporti a Trieste. Dalla Società triestina Tramway all'Azienda Consorziale Trasporti", Nuova Del Bianco, Udine, 1982.
- Roberto Carollo, Leandro Steffè, "Il servizio tranviario nella città di Trieste" chapter in "Il museo ferroviario di Trieste Campo Marzio", Luglio Editore, Trieste, 2007, pp. 106–109, ISBN 978-88-89153-23-9.

== See also ==
- Trolleybuses in Trieste
- Trieste-Opicina Tramway
- List of town tramway systems in Italy
