= Loka pri Zidanem Mostu =

- Village
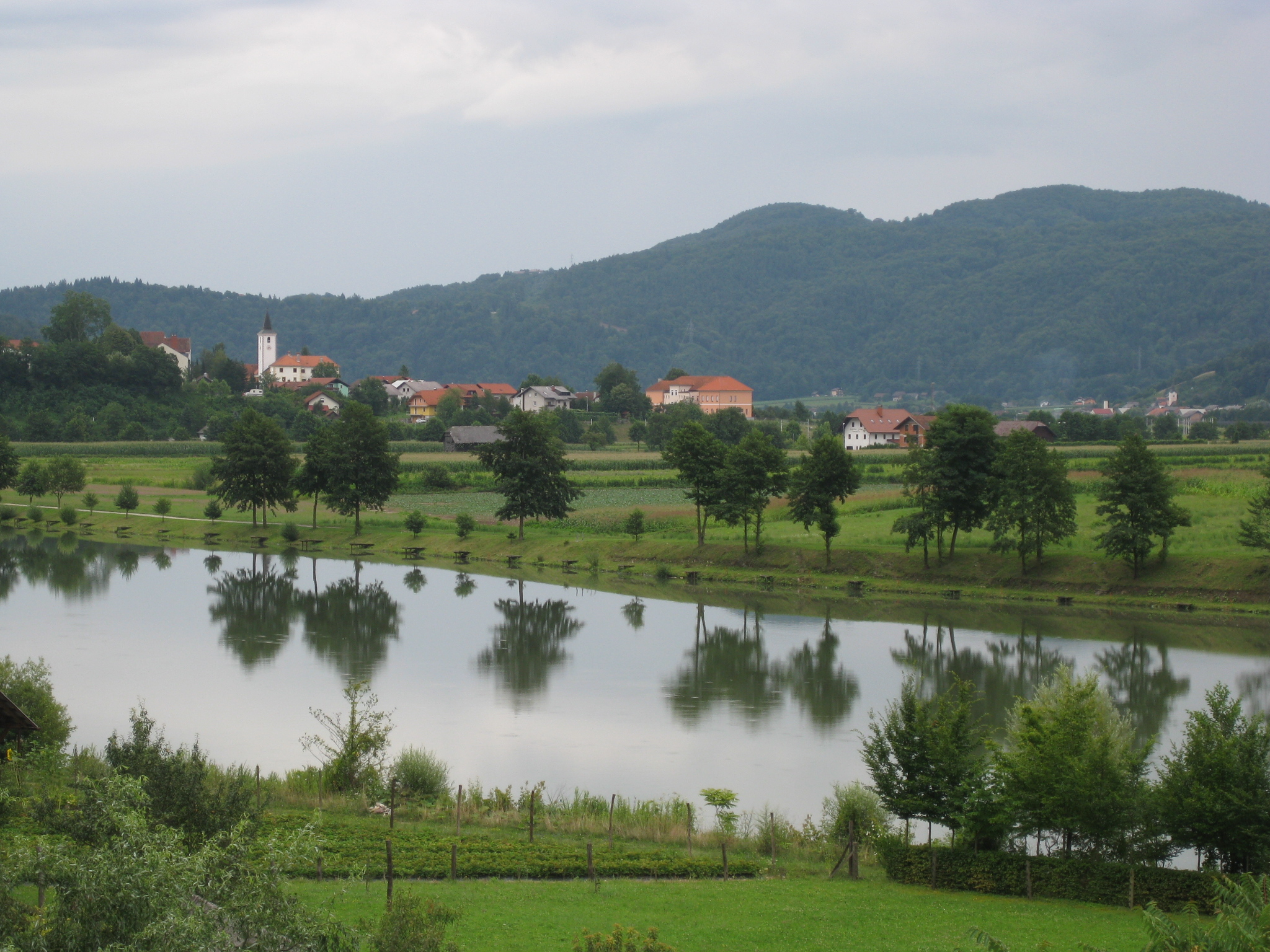

- Location of Loka pri Zidanem Mostu in Slovenia
- Coordinates: 46°3′20.44″N 15°12′29.98″E
- Country: Slovenia
- Traditional region: Styria
- Statistical region: Lower Sava
- Municipality: Sevnica

Area
  - Total: 1.64 km^{2} (0.63 sq mi)
- Elevation: 210.3 m (690 ft)

Population (Census 2002)
  - Total: 472
  - Density: 288/km^{2} (745/sq mi)
- Postal code: 1434
- Source: Statistical Office of the Republic of Slovenia, census of 2002.

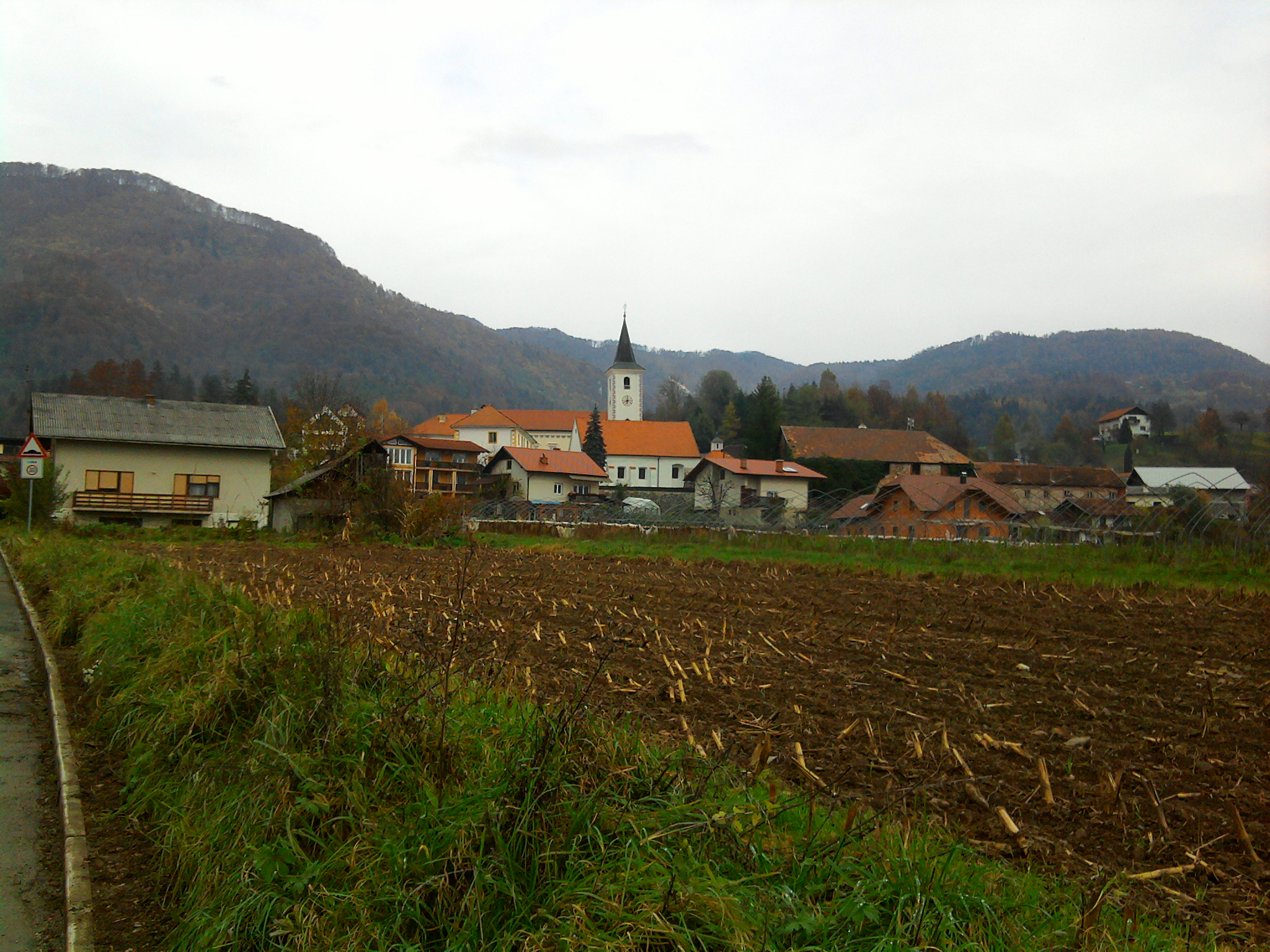
Loka pri Zidanem Mostu

Loka pri Zidanem Mostu (pronounced [ˈloːka pɾi ˈziːdanɛm ˈmoːstu]) is a village on the left bank of the Sava River in the Municipality of Sevnica in central Slovenia. The area is part of the historical region of Styria. The municipality is now included in the Lower Sava Statistical Region.

== Name ==
The name of the settlement was changed from Loka to Loka pri Zidanem Mostu (literally, 'Loka near Zidani Most') in 1952. The toponym Loka is frequent in Slovenia and comes from the common noun loka 'flood-meadow', referring to the local geography.

== Church ==
The parish church in the settlement is dedicated to Saint Helena and belongs to the Roman Catholic Diocese of Celje. It was originally a 13th-century church that was restyled in the Baroque in 1740.

== Notable people ==
Notable people that were born or lived in Loka pri Zidanem Mostu include:

- Ivan Fon (1860–1912), education specialist and textbook author
- Ludvik Mrzel (1904–1971), writer, poet, and journalist
- Janko Prunk (born 1942), historian
- Ferdinand Ripšl (1820–1887), poet, orchardist, and local historian
- Zora Tavčar (born 1928), poet and writer
- Primož Trubar (1508–1586), Protestant preacher (served as priest in the village between 1529 and 1531)
- Alenka Rebula Tuta (born 1954), poet, author, and psychotherapist

== Demographics ==
Population by age groups and sex, 2002
	0–14	15–24	25–34	35–44	45–54	55–64	65–74	75+	Total
Male	20	20	23	20	28	24	31	20	186
Female	19	16	23	25	22	29	48	104	286
Total	39	36	46	45	50	53	79	124	472
