= Zora Tavčar =

Slovene writer, essayist and translator

- Born: October 2, 1928; Loka pri Zidanem Mostu, Kingdom of Yugoslavia (now in Slovenia)
- Died: 4 August 2025 (aged 96); Loka pri Zidanem Mostu, Slovenia
- Occupations: Writer, essayist and translator
- Writing career
- Notable works: Veter v laseh, Velika maša

Zora Tavčar (2 October 1928–4 August 2025) was a Slovene writer, essayist and translator, living in Opicina in the suburbs of Trieste, Italy. She was married to a notable member of the Slovene minority in Italy, writer Alojz Rebula.

== Life ==
Tavčar was born in Loka pri Zidanem Mostu in 1928. She studied comparative literature, literary theory and Slovene language and literature at the University of Ljubljana. In 1963 she completed her doctorate at the Catholic University of Milan.

In 1951, she married the Slovene writer and playwright Alojz Rebula and moved to Opicina near Trieste. Until her retirement in 1988, she taught at various secondary schools with Slovene as the language of instruction in the Trieste region.

== Work ==
She started off with writing poetry, but is better known for her short stories, essays and radio plays.

== Published works ==
- Veter v laseh (The Wind in My Hair), 1982
- Ob kresu življenja (At the Bonfire of Life), 1989
- Kroži, kroži galeb (Fly in Circles, Fly Seagull), 2008
