= Alojz Rebula =

Slovenian writer (1924–2018)

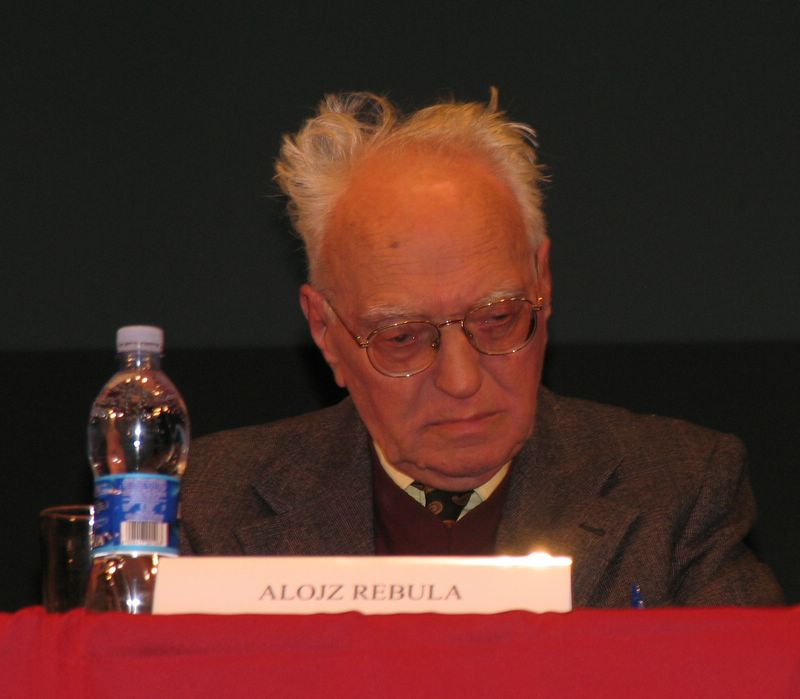
- Alojz Rebula in 2007
- Born: June 21, 1924; San Pelagio, Kingdom of Italy
- Died: October 23, 2018 (aged 94); Topolšica, Slovenia
- Occupations: Writer; playwright; essayist
- Spouse(s): Zora Tavčar (writer) (m. 1951–2018; his death)
- Children: Alenka Rebula Tuta (poet)
- Writing career
- Notable works: The Roman Empress' Vineyard, Nocturne for Primorska, Matins for Slovenia, Maranathà or the Year 999, The Snake Flower, Tomorrow across the Jordan, In the Wind of Sybil; The Shadow Dance; Jacques Maritain: The Bearer of Sense
- Notable awards: Prešeren Award; 1995 for his literary work Acerbi Prize; 1997 Nel vento della Sibilla; Kresnik Award; 2005 A Nocturne for Primorska

Alojz Rebula (June 21, 1924 – October 23, 2018) was a Slovene writer, playwright, essayist, and translator, and a prominent member of the Slovene minority in Italy. He lived and worked in Villa Opicina in the Province of Trieste, Italy. He was a member of the Slovenian Academy of Sciences and Arts.

== Life ==
Rebula was born in the ethnically Slovene village of San Pelagio (Slovene: Šempolaj) near Duino, in what was then the Kingdom of Italy. Because of the anti-Slavic Italianization policies of the Fascist regime, Rebula could not have an education in his native language. He attended Italian-language schools, where he became acquainted with Italian culture and literature. He went to the gymnasium of Gorizia and later the lyceum in Udine, which he graduated from in 1944. After the end of World War II, he moved to Yugoslavia. He studied classical philology at the University in Ljubljana, from where he graduated in 1949. In 1951, he moved back to Italy because of the pressures of the Communist regime. In 1956, he was banned from entering Yugoslavia because of his political opposition to the Communist system. In 1960 Rebula obtained his PhD from the University of Rome with the thesis Dante's Divine Comedy in Slovene Translations. The same year the authorities prohibited him from entering Yugoslavia for a second time, because he had publicly protested in Trieste newspapers against the suppression of the publication of the novel Listina (The Document) by Edvard Kocbek in Slovenia.

In the 1960s Rebula settled in Trieste, where he worked as a teacher of Latin and Ancient Greek at secondary schools with Slovene as the language of instruction. He also engaged in cultural work with the local Slovene community.

Together with Boris Pahor, he edited the journal Zaliv (The Bay), founded to promote political and cultural pluralism and the values of western democracy. He was also co-editor of the literary journals Sidro (Anchor), Tokovi (Currents) and Most (Bridge).

During this period, Rebula re-embraced Catholicism, after having turned to vitalist agnosticism in his teenage years, due partially to the influence of Friedrich Nietzsche and Slovene modernist authors such as Oton Župančič.

In 1975, Pahor and Rebula published a book interview entitled Edvard Kocbek: Pričevalec našega časa (Edvard Kocbek: Witness of Our Time), in which Rebula condemned the summary killings of 12,000 members of Slovene anti-communist militia in May and June 1945, perpetrated by the Communist authorities. The book created a scandal in Yugoslavia and both Pahor and Rebula were banned from entering Yugoslavia for several years.

After the democratization and independence of Slovenia in 1990 and 1991, Rebula worked as a columnist for several Catholic journals and magazines in Slovenia. He lived and worked in his native village in the Italian part of the Karst region. Rebula died on October 23, 2018, at the age of 94.

== Work ==
Rebula published numerous collections of essays, diaries, novels, plays, short prose, and other works that have been translated into a number of foreign languages. The prominent Slovene author and intellectual Andrej Capuder stated that Rebula's work "is the best we Slovenes can show to the world today." The terms that best define Rebula are antiquity, Christianity and Slovenehood or, as he stated himself: "Ancestral Karst ordered two tyrannical loves: on an ancient raft you shall cleave the Slovene sea!"

His source of inspirations mostly came from the historical, cultural, and natural world of the Slovenian Littoral, although he also wrote a novel on the life of the missionary Frederick Baraga. He reflects on the fate of a small nation and on the more general issues of the human condition. His prose is lyrical and reflexive. He is renowned for his diaries and essays. Alongside the philosopher Milan Komar (whose works were prohibited in Slovenia until the late 1980s), Rebula was one of the first Slovene authors who wrote extensively about the philosophy of Jacques Maritain, whom Rebula sees as one of his most important "spiritual fathers".

He also translated Aeschylus' Seven Against Thebes and Plautus' Miles Gloriosus into Slovene as well as Slovene authors such as Kocbek and Levstik into Italian.

Rebula was awarded several prizes for his writing. In 1969 he received the Prešeren Fund Award, the so-called "small" Prešeren award, for the novel V Sibilnem vetru (In Sybil’s Wind). In 1995 he received the Prešeren Award, the highest Slovenian prize for cultural achievements, for artistic achievement for his life's work. In 1997 he was awarded the Acerbi Prize for his novel In Sybil’s Wind in the Italian translation, and in 2005 the Kresnik Award for A Nocturne for the Littoral, which the jury voted the best Slovene novel of the year.

Rebula died on October 23, 2018, at the age of 94.

== List of works ==
Prose

- Devinski sholar, novel, (The Duino Scholar, 1954)
- Vinograd rimske cesarice , short stories, (Vineyard of the Roman Empress, 1956)
- Klic v Sredozemlje, novel, (A Call to the Mediterranean, 1957)
- Senčni ples novel, (Shadow Dance, (1960)
- V Sibilinem vetru novel, (In Sybil's Wind, 1968)
- Divji golob novel, (Wild Dove, 1972)
- Zeleno izgnanstvo novel, (Green Exile, 1981)
- Jutri čez Jordan novel, (Tomorrow over the River Jordan, 1988)
- Kačja roža novel, (Snake Flower, 1994)
- Maranathà ali Leto 999 novel, (Maranathà or the Year 999, 1996)
- Cesta s cipreso in zvezdo novel, (The Road with the Cypress and the Star, 1998)
- Jutranjice za Slovenijo novel, (Matins for Slovenia, 2000)
- Nokturno za Primorsko novel, (Nocturne for the Littoral, 2004)

Plays

- Savlov demon, six plays with a religious theme, (Saul's Demon, 1985)
- Operacija Timava, two acts, (The Timava Operation, 1993)
