= Alenka Rebula Tuta =

- Born: April 14, 1954 (age 72); Loka pri Zidanem Mostu, Slovenia
- Occupations: Poet; essayist; academic
- Spouse: Igor Tuta
- Writing career
- Genres: essays, poetry, studies in psychology
- Website: www.alenkarebula.com

Alenka Rebula Tuta (born April 14, 1954) is a Slovene writer, poet, applied psychologist and a notable member of the Slovene minority in Italy. She lives and works in Sistiana in the Province of Trieste, Italy.

== Life ==
She was born to Alojz Rebula and Zora Tavčar, both notable Slovene writers. After finishing high school, with Slovene as the language of instruction in Trieste, she receiuved a bachelor's degree in psychology at the University of Trieste. She married Igor Tuta, a radio program editor and director. They have two daughters and one son.

== Work ==
Rebula initially worked as psychologist and is now teaching at Anton Martin Slomšek College in Trieste. Her 1999 book on developmental psychology places particular emphasis on early infant experiences; Globine, ki so nas rodile (The Depths We Are Born From) is the first work written by a Slovenian author that rejects the alienation of analytic terminology in favor of treating the subject with an increased sensibility towards the infant's needs. The book was reprinted in 2009. In 2010 Alenka Rebula took part in a TV documentary on her life and work, together with another notable female author (Alenka Puhar) and her book Prvotno besedilo življenja (The Primal Text of Life). The documentary was aired by the national public broadcasting organization RTV Slovenija.

== Poetry ==
- 1983: Mavrični ščit (The Rainbow Shield), Trieste: ZTT
- 2009: V naročju (Embraced), Trieste: ZTT

== Prose ==
- 2010 100 Faces of Inner Strength (in Slovene: Sto obrazov notranje moči), Mladinska knjiga, Ljubljana

== Psychology ==
- 1999 The Depths we are Born from (in Slovene: Globine, ki so nas rodile), Mohorjeva založba
- 2007 Feeling Blessed (in Slovene: Blagor ženskam), ZTT, Trieste
