= Zleteče =

- Location in Slovenia
- Coordinates: 46°02′34″N 15°16′50″E
- Country: Slovenia
- Traditional region: Styria
- Statistical region: Lower Sava
- Municipality: Sevnica
- Elevation: 493 m (1,617 ft)

Zleteče (pronounced [zlɛˈteːtʃɛ], in older sources also Sletiče, German: Sletsche) is a former settlement in the Municipality of Sevnica in central Slovenia. It is now part of the village of Ledina. The area is part of the traditional region of Styria. The municipality is now included in the Lower Sava Statistical Region.

== Geography ==
Zleteče is located northwest of Ledina, about 950 meters (3,120 ft) from the village center, at the top of a rise between the Sava River to the west and the Sevnična River to the east.

== Name ==
Zleteče was attested in historical sources as Slettez in 1364 and Sletecz in 1436.

== History ==
Zleteče was deemed annexed by Ledina in 1955, ending any existence it had as an independent settlement.
