= 1972 =

1972 in various calendars
- Gregorian calendar: 1972; MCMLXXII
- Ab urbe condita: 2725
- Armenian calendar: 1421; ԹՎ ՌՆԻԱ
- Assyrian calendar: 6722
- Baháʼí calendar: 128–129
- Balinese saka calendar: 1893–1894
- Bengali calendar: 1378–1379
- Berber calendar: 2922
- British Regnal year: 20 Eliz. 2 – 21 Eliz. 2
- Buddhist calendar: 2516
- Burmese calendar: 1334
- Byzantine calendar: 7480–7481
- Chinese calendar: 辛亥年 (Metal Pig); 4669 or 4462 — to — 壬子年 (Water Rat); 4670 or 4463
- Coptic calendar: 1688–1689
- Discordian calendar: 3138
- Ethiopian calendar: 1964–1965
- Hebrew calendar: 5732–5733
- Hindu calendars
- Vikram Samvat: 2028–2029
- Shaka Samvat: 1893–1894
- Kali Yuga: 5072–5073
- Holocene calendar: 11972
- Igbo calendar: 972–973
- Iranian calendar: 1350–1351
- Islamic calendar: 1391–1392
- Japanese calendar: Shōwa 47 (昭和４７年)
- Javanese calendar: 1903–1904
- Juche calendar: 61
- Julian calendar: Gregorian minus 13 days
- Korean calendar: 4305
- Minguo calendar: ROC 61 民國61年
- Nanakshahi calendar: 504
- Thai solar calendar: 2515
- Tibetan calendar: ལྕགས་མོ་ཕག་ལོ་ (female Iron-Boar); 2098 or 1717 or 945 — to — ཆུ་ཕོ་བྱི་བ་ལོ་ (male Water-Rat); 2099 or 1718 or 946
- Unix time: 63072000 – 94694399

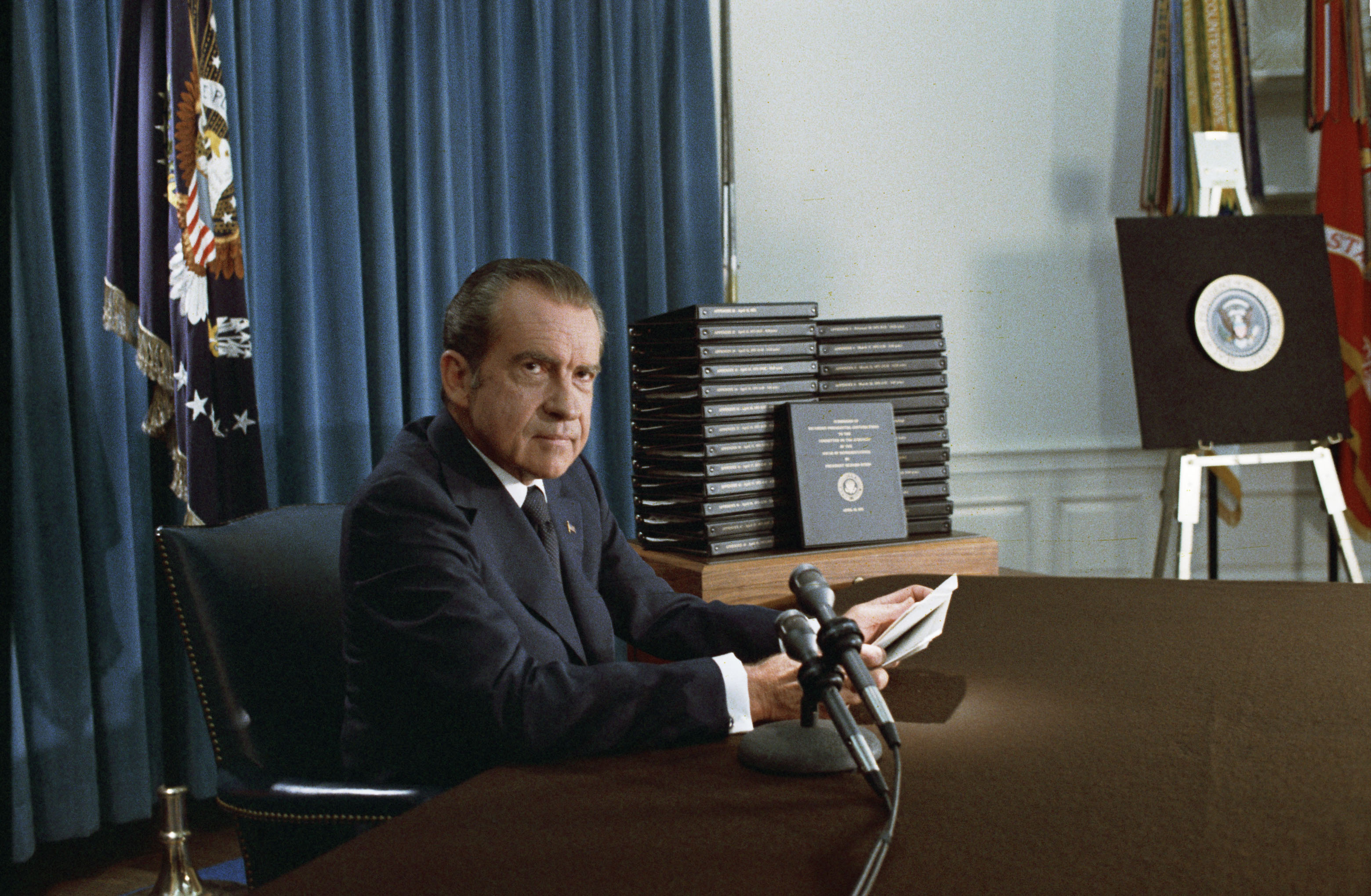
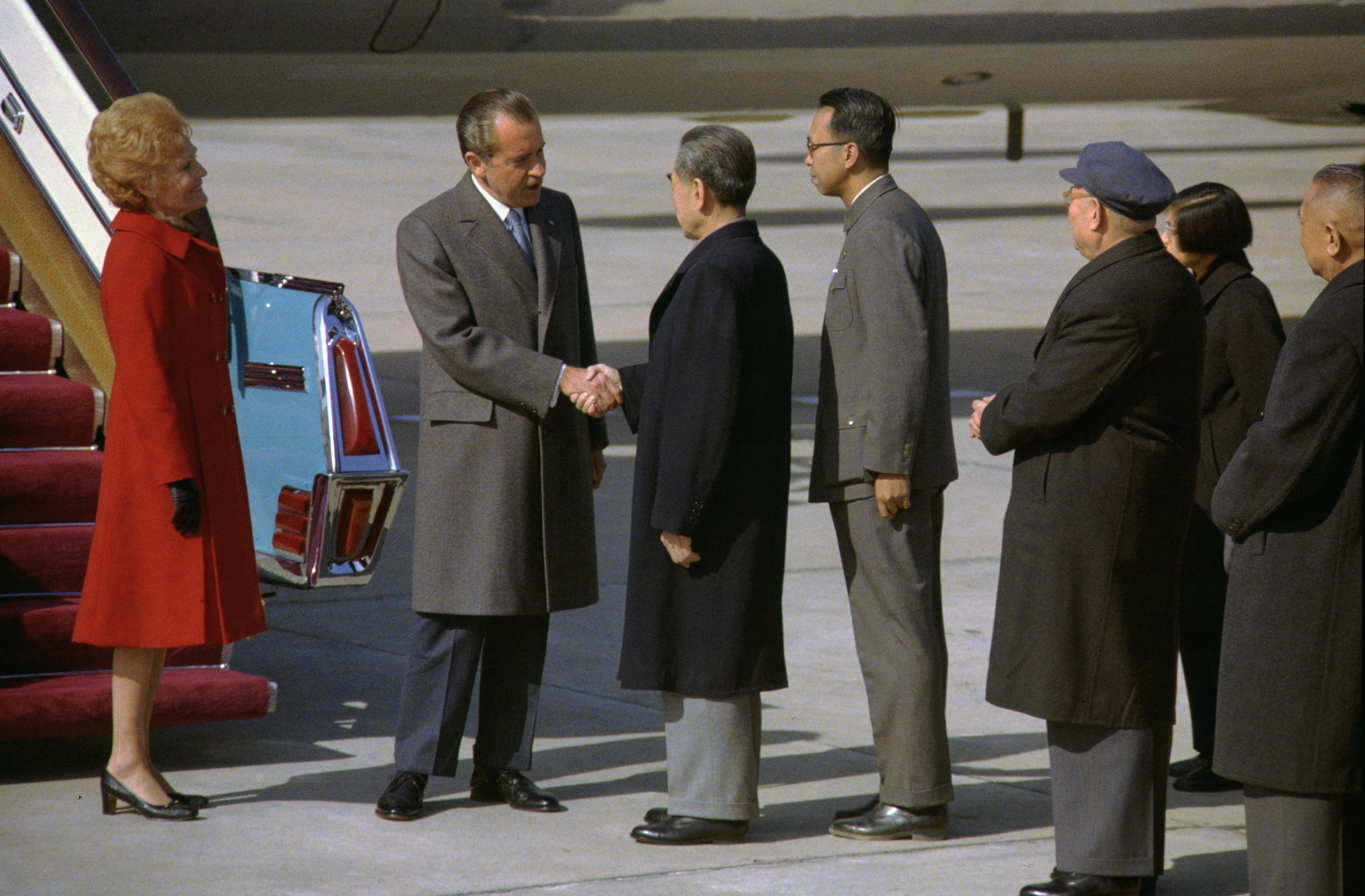
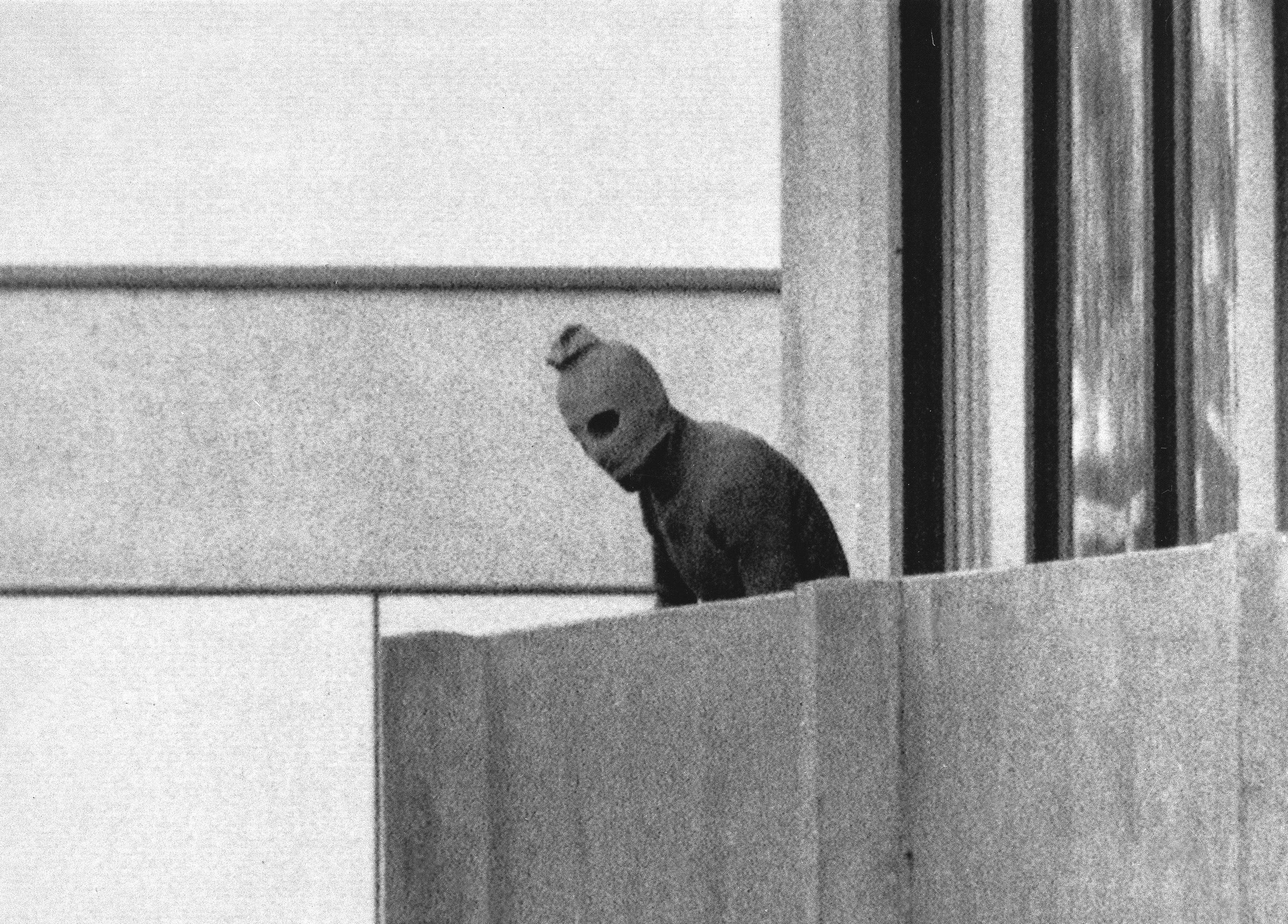
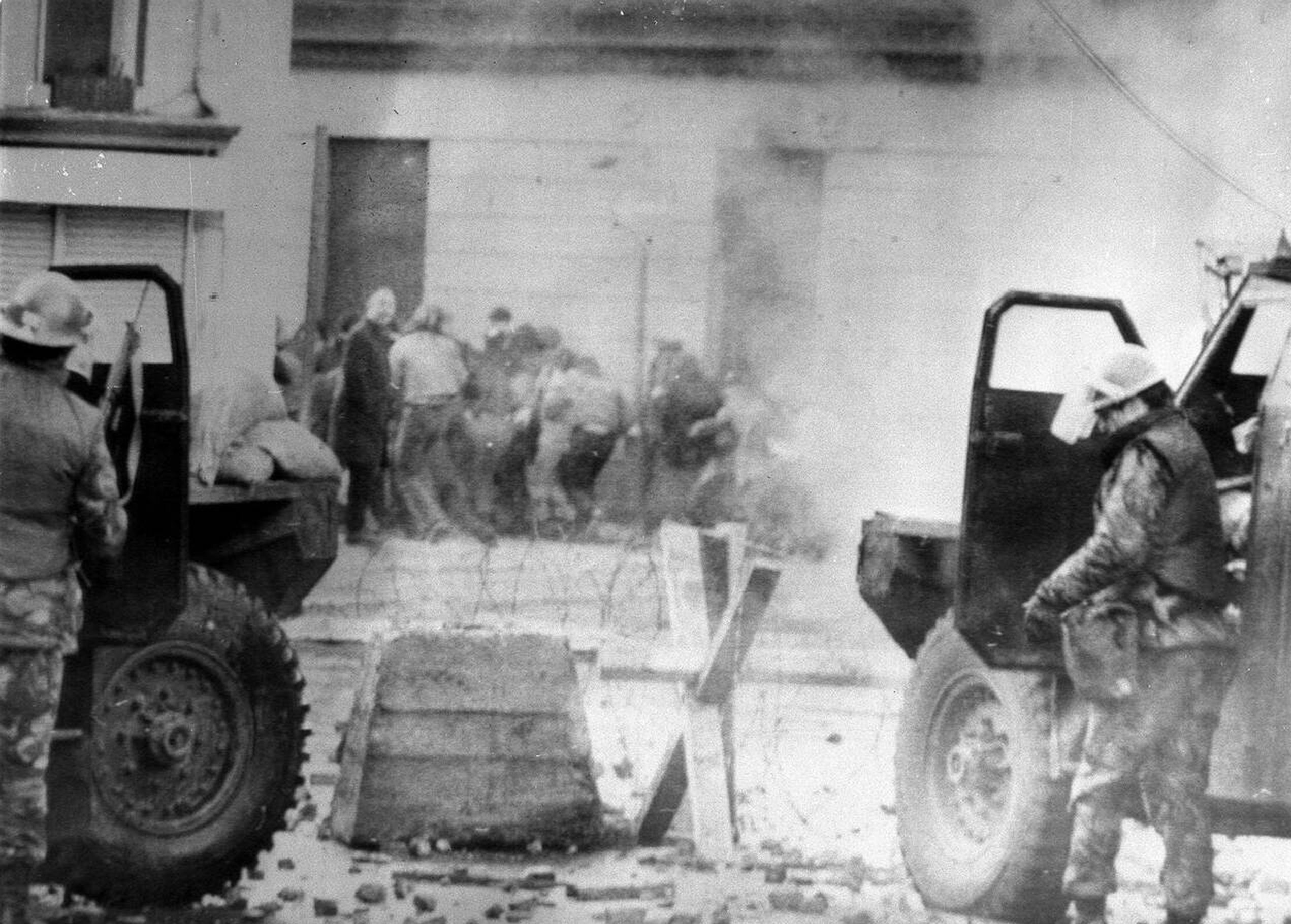
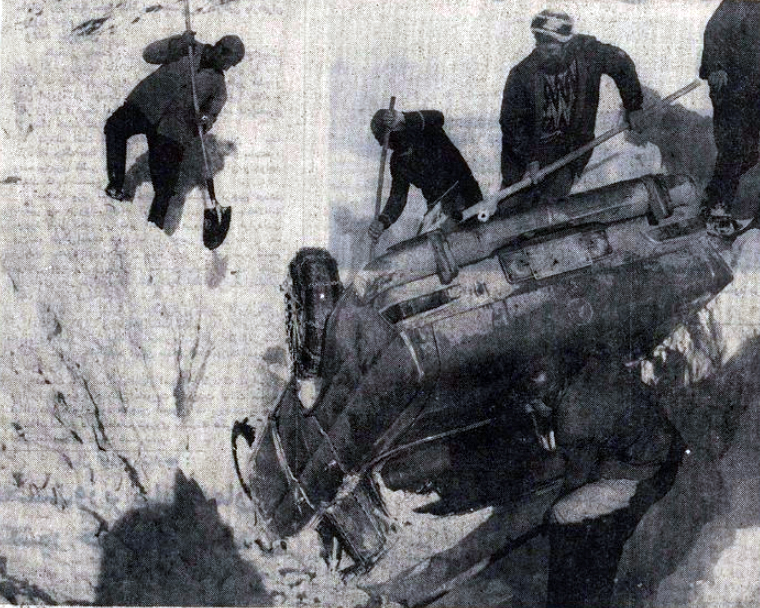
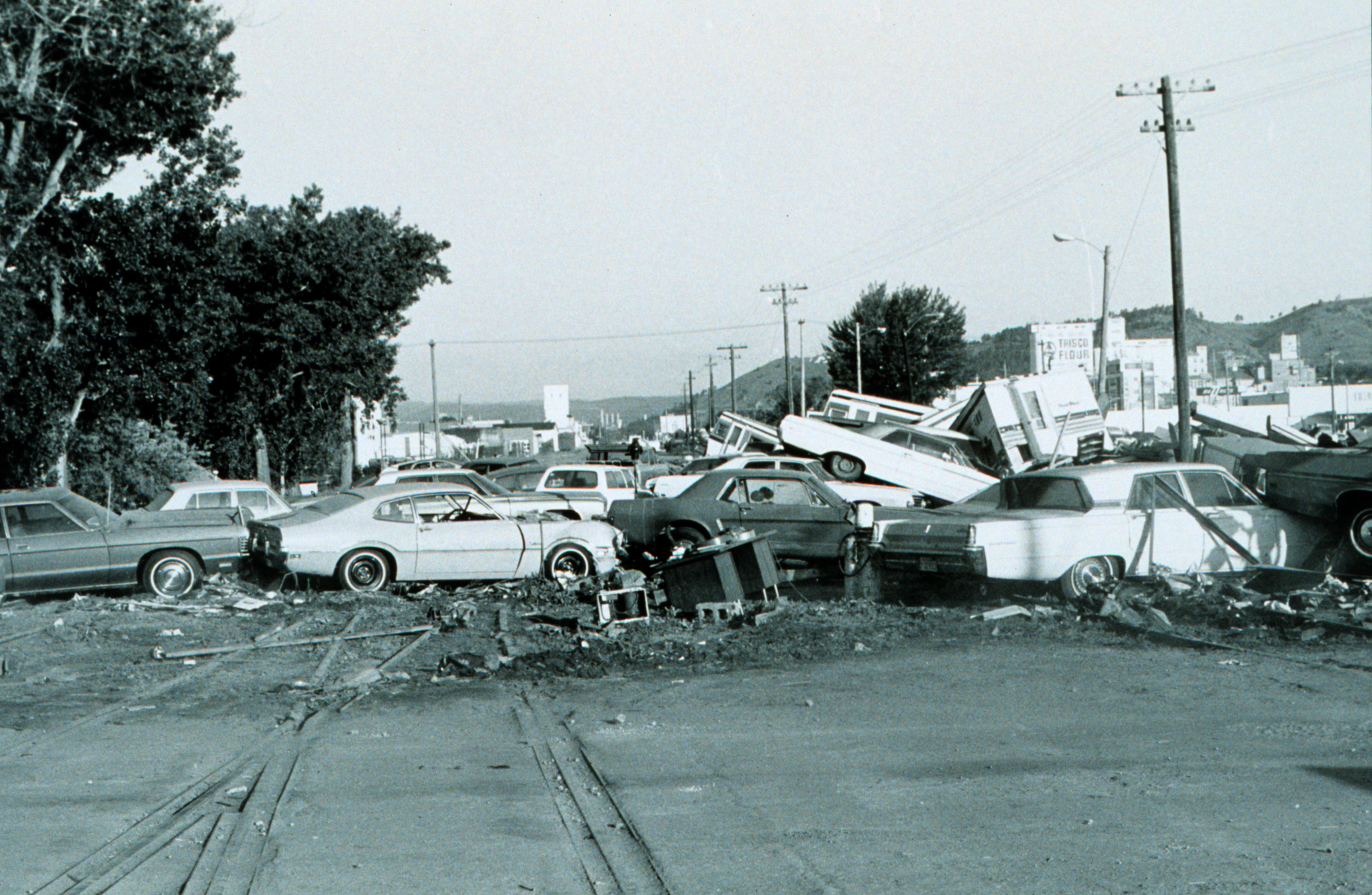
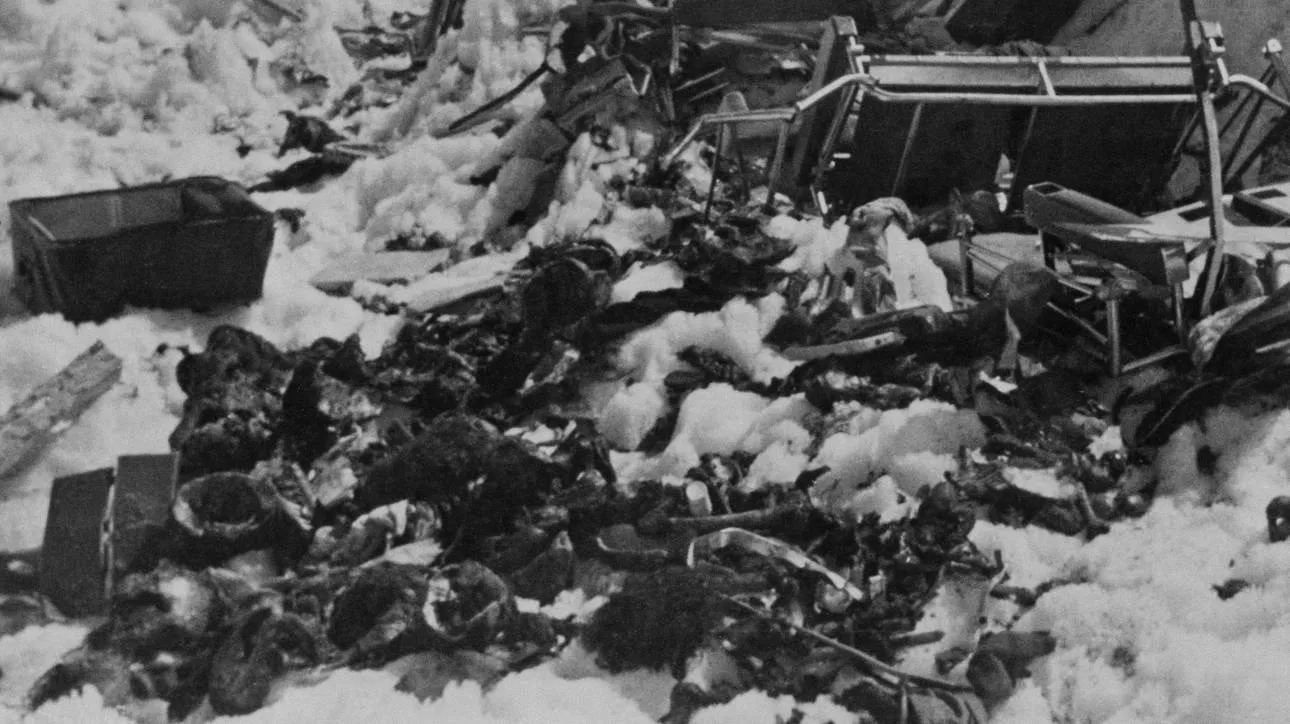
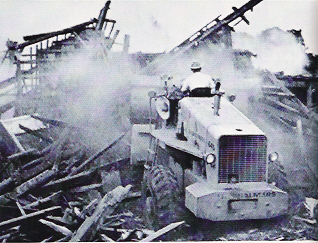
From top to bottom, left to right: the Watergate scandal begins with the DNC break-in, triggering a major U.S. political crisis; President Richard Nixon makes a historic visit to China; the 1972 Summer Olympics are marred by the Munich massacre; Apollo 17 becomes the final Apollo Moon landing; Bloody Sunday intensifies the Troubles in Northern Ireland; the 1972 Iran blizzard kills thousands; the 1972 Black Hills flood kills 238 in Rapid City, South Dakota; Uruguayan Air Force Flight 571 crashes in the Andes, leading to a dramatic survival ordeal; and the 1972 Nicaragua earthquake devastates Managua.

1972 (MCMLXXII) was a leap year starting on Saturday of the Gregorian calendar, the 1972nd year of the Common Era (CE) and Anno Domini (AD) designations, the 972nd year of the 2nd millennium, the 72nd year of the 20th century, and the 3rd year of the 1970s decade.

Within the context of Coordinated Universal Time (UTC) it was the longest year ever, as two leap seconds were added during this 366-day year, an event which has not since been repeated. (If its start and end are defined using mean solar time [the legal time scale], its duration was 31622401.141 seconds of Terrestrial Time (or Ephemeris Time), which is slightly shorter than 1908).

== Events ==
=== January ===
- January 1 – Kurt Waldheim becomes Secretary-General of the United Nations.
- January 4 – The first scientific hand-held calculator (HP-35) is introduced (price $395).
- January 7 – Iberia Airlines Flight 602 crashes into a 462-meter peak on the island of Ibiza; 104 are killed.
- January 9 – The RMS Queen Elizabeth catches fire and sinks in Hong Kong's Victoria harbor while undergoing conversion to a floating university.
- January 10 – Independence leader Sheikh Mujibur Rahman returns to Bangladesh after spending over nine months in prison in Pakistan.
- January 11 – Sheikh Mujibur Rahman declares a new constitutional government in Bangladesh, with himself as president.
- January 12 – In a 10-hour siege, a cell of 4 left-wing insurgents hold off a task force of 2500 army soldiers and police agents in Santo Domingo, Dominican Republic: eight members of the security forces and the entire insurgent cell are killed in the course of the siege.
- January 13 – Prime Minister of Ghana Kofi Abrefa Busia is overthrown in a military coup by Colonel Ignatius Kutu Acheampong.
- January 14 – Queen Margrethe II of Denmark succeeds her father, King Frederik IX, on the throne of Denmark, the first queen regnant of Denmark since 1412 and the first Danish monarch not named Frederick or Christian since 1513.
- January 18 – Members of the Mukti Bahini lay down their arms to the government of the newly independent Bangladesh, 33 days after winning the war against the occupying Pakistan Army.
- January 19 – The Libertarian enclave Minerva on a platform in the South Pacific, sponsored by the Phoenix Foundation, declares independence. Soon neighboring Tonga annexes the area and dismantles the platform.
- January 20 – President Zulfikar Ali Bhutto announces that Pakistan will immediately begin a nuclear weapons program.
- January 21
  - A New Delhi bootlegger sells wood alcohol to a wedding party; 100 people die.
  - Tripura, part of the former independent Twipra Kingdom, becomes a full state of India.
- January 24 – Japanese soldier Shoichi Yokoi is discovered in Guam; he has spent 28 years in the jungle, having failed to surrender after World War II.
- January 26
  - Yugoslavian air stewardess Vesna Vulović is the only survivor when her plane crashes in Czechoslovakia. She survives after falling 10,160 meters (33,330 feet) in the tail section of the aircraft.
  - The Aboriginal Tent Embassy is set up on the lawn of Parliament House in Canberra.
- January 30
  - Bloody Sunday: The British Army kills 14 unarmed nationalist civil rights marchers in Derry, Northern Ireland.
  - Pakistan withdraws from the Commonwealth of Nations.
- January 31 – King Birendra succeeds his father as King of Nepal.

=== February ===
- February 2
  - A bomb explodes at the British Yacht Club in West Berlin, killing Irwin Beelitz, a German boat builder. The West German militant group June 2 Movement claims responsibility, announcing its support of the Provisional Irish Republican Army.
  - Anti-British riots take place throughout Ireland. The British Embassy in Dublin is burned to the ground, as are several British-owned businesses.
- February 3–13 – The 1972 Winter Olympics are held in Sapporo, Japan.
- February 4 – Mariner 9 sends pictures as it orbits Mars.
- February 15 – President of Ecuador José María Velasco Ibarra is deposed for the fourth time.
- February 17 – Volkswagen Beetle sales exceed those of the Ford Model T when the 15,007,034th Beetle is produced.
- February 19 – Asama-Sansō incident: Five United Red Army members break into a lodge below Mount Asama in Japan, taking the wife of the lodgekeeper hostage.
- February 21 – The Soviet uncrewed spaceship Luna 20 lands on the Moon.
- February 21–28 – U.S. President Richard Nixon makes an unprecedented 8-day visit to the People's Republic of China and meets with Mao Zedong.
- February 22
  - The Troubles: 1972 Aldershot bombing – A car bomb planted by the Official Irish Republican Army kills seven people outside a British military base in Aldershot, England.
  - Lufthansa Flight 649 is hijacked and taken to Aden. Passengers are released the following day after a ransom of 5 million US dollars is agreed.
- February 23 – US activist Angela Davis is released from jail. Rodger McAfee, a farmer from Caruthers, California, helps her make bail.
- February 26 – Luna 20 comes back to Earth with 55 grams (1.9 ounces) of lunar soil.
- February 28 – The Asama-Sansō incident ends in a standoff between 5 members of the Japanese United Red Army and the authorities, in which two policemen are killed and 12 injured.

=== March ===
- March 1 – Juan María Bordaberry is sworn in as President of Uruguay amid accusations of electoral fraud.
- March 2
  - The Club of Rome presents the research results leading to its report The Limits to Growth, published later in the month.
  - The Pioneer 10 spacecraft is launched from Cape Kennedy, to be the first man-made spacecraft to leave the Solar System.
  - Jean-Bédel Bokassa becomes President of the Central African Republic.
- March 4
  - Libya and the Soviet Union sign a cooperation treaty.
  - The Organisation of the Islamic Conference Charter is signed (effective February 28, 1973).
- March 19 – India and Bangladesh sign the Indo-Bangladeshi Treaty of Friendship, Cooperation and Peace.
- March 22
  - The 92nd U.S. Congress votes to send the proposed Equal Rights Amendment to the states for ratification.
  - Eisenstadt v. Baird: The Supreme Court of the U.S. rules that unmarried people have the right to access contraception on the same basis as married couples
- March 25 – "Après toi" sung by Vicky Leandros (music by Klaus Munro & Mario Panas, lyric by Klaus Munro & Yves Dessca) wins the Eurovision Song Contest 1972 (staged in Edinburgh) for Luxembourg.
- March 26 – An avalanche on Mount Fuji in Japan kills 19 climbers.
- March 27
  - The First Sudanese Civil War ends.
  - The Soviet Union launches Venera 8, which will make the first soft landing on Venus.
- March 30 – Vietnam War: The Easter Offensive begins after North Vietnamese forces cross into the Demilitarized Zone (DMZ) of South Vietnam

=== April ===
- April 4 – The U.S. formally recognizes Bangladesh.
- April 10
  - The U.S. and the Soviet Union join some 70 nations in signing the Biological Weapons Convention, an agreement to ban biological warfare.
  - Tombs containing bamboo slips, among them Sun Tzu's Art of War and Sun Bin's lost military treatise, are accidentally discovered by construction workers in Shandong.
  - The 6.7 M_{w} Qir earthquake shakes southern Iran with a maximum Mercalli intensity of IX (Violent), killing 5,374 people in the province of Fars.
  - The 44th Annual Academy Awards are held at the Dorothy Chandler Pavilion in Los Angeles.
- April 13 – The Universal Postal Union decides to recognize the People's Republic of China as the only legitimate Chinese representative, effectively expelling the Republic of China administering Taiwan.
- April 16
  - Apollo 16 (John Young, Ken Mattingly, Charlie Duke) is launched. During the mission, the astronauts, driving the Lunar Roving Vehicle, achieve a lunar rover speed record of 17 km/h.
  - Vietnam War: Nguyen Hue Offensive – Prompted by the North Vietnamese offensive, the United States resumes bombing of Hanoi and Haiphong.
- April 26 – The Lockheed L-1011 TriStar enters service with Eastern Airlines.
- April 27
  - Ikiza: Burundi government forces begin a 4-month genocide against the Hutu people, killing 100,000–300,000.
  - A no-confidence vote against German Chancellor Willy Brandt fails under obscure circumstances; years later it turned out that at least one opposition MP was paid by the East German Stasi for not supporting the vote.
- April 29 – The fourth anniversary of the Broadway musical Hair is celebrated with a free concert at a Central Park bandshell, followed by dinner at the Four Seasons. There, 13 Black Panther protesters and the show's co-author, Jim Rado, are arrested for disturbing the peace and for using marijuana.

=== May ===
- May 2 – Fire at the Sunshine Mine, a silver mine in Idaho, kills 91.
- May 5 – An Alitalia DC-8 crashes west of Palermo, Sicily; 115 die.
- May 7 – General elections are held in Italy.
- May 10 – Operation Linebacker and Operation Custom Tailor begin with large-scale bombing operations against North Vietnam by tactical fighter aircraft.
- May 13 – A fire in a nightclub atop the Sennichi department store in Osaka, Japan, kills 115.
- May 21 – In St. Peter's Basilica (Vatican City), Laszlo Toth attacks Michelangelo's Pietà statue with a geologist's hammer, shouting that he is Jesus Christ.
- May 22
  - The Dominion of Ceylon becomes the republic of Sri Lanka under prime minister Sirimavo Bandaranaike, when its new constitution is ratified.
  - Ferit Melen forms the new (interim) government of Turkey (35th government)
- May 23 – The Tamil United Front (later known as Tamil United Liberation Front), a pro-Tamil organization, is founded in Sri Lanka.
- May 26
  - Richard Nixon and Leonid Brezhnev sign the SALT I treaty in Moscow, as well as the Anti-Ballistic Missile Treaty and other agreements.
  - Willandra National Park is established in Australia.
- May 27 – Mark Donohue wins the Indianapolis 500 in a Penske Racing McLaren–Offenhauser.
- May 30
  - Lod Airport massacre: Three Japanese Red Army members operating on behalf of the Popular Front for the Liberation of Palestine – External Operations kill 26 and injure 80 people at Lod Airport, Israel.
  - The Troubles: The Official Irish Republican Army declares a ceasefire.

=== June ===
- June – Iraq nationalizes the Iraq Petroleum Company.
- June 3 – Sally Priesand becomes the first American woman (and the second known woman anywhere) to be ordained as a rabbi within Judaism.
- June 5–16 – The United Nations Conference on the Human Environment is held in Stockholm, Sweden
- June 8
  - Seven men and three women hijack a plane from Czechoslovakia to West Germany.
  - Vietnam War: Associated Press photographer Nick Ut takes his Pulitzer Prize-winning photograph of a naked nine-year-old Phan Thi Kim Phuc running down a road after being burned by napalm.
- June 9 – The Black Hills flood kills 238 in South Dakota.
- June 11 – Henri Pescarolo (France) and co-driver former World Drivers' Champion Graham Hill (Britain) win the 24 Hours of Le Mans in the Equipe Matra MS670.
- June 12 – Popeyes was formed in Arabi, Louisiana, a suburb of New Orleans, Louisiana, in St. Bernard Parish.
- June 14–23 – Hurricane Agnes kills 117 on the U.S. East Coast.
- June 14 – Japan Airlines Flight 471 crashes outside New Delhi airport, killing 82 of 87 occupants.
- June 16 – 108 die as two passenger trains hit the debris of a collapsed railway tunnel near Soissons, France.
- June 17
  - Watergate scandal: Five White House operatives are arrested for burgling the offices of the Democratic National Committee.
  - Chilean president Salvador Allende forms a new government.
- June 18
  - Staines air disaster: 118 die when a British European Airways Trident 1 jet airliner crashes two minutes after takeoff from London Heathrow Airport.
  - West Germany beats the Soviet Union 3–0 in the final to win Euro '72.
  - Hong Kong's worst flooding and landslides in recorded history with 653.2 millimetres (25.72 in) of rainfall in the previous three days. 67 people die due to building collapses in Mid-levels districts landslide and building collapses, with a further 83 due to flooding-related fatalities. It is the second worst fatality due to building collapses, and the worst flooding in Hong Kong's recorded history.
- June 23
  - Watergate scandal: U.S. President Richard M. Nixon and White House chief of staff H. R. Haldeman are taped talking about using the C.I.A. to obstruct the investigation by the F.B.I. into the Watergate break-ins.
  - The United Kingdom Chancellor of the Exchequer, Anthony Barber, announces a decision for the pound sterling to move to a floating exchange rate. Although intended to be temporary, this remains permanent. Foreign exchange controls are applied to most members of the sterling area.
- June 29 – United States Supreme Court Case Furman v. Georgia, the Supreme Court decides that inconsistent imposition of the death penalty is unconstitutional and violates the eighth and fourteenth Amendments, causing almost 700 death sentences to be repealed. Furthermore, dozens of states rewrote their death sentence laws resulting from the decision.
- June 30 – The International Time Bureau adds the first leap second (23:59:60) of this year to Coordinated Universal Time (UTC).

=== July ===
- July 1 – The Canadian ketch Vega, flying the Greenpeace III banner, collides with the French naval minesweeper La Paimpolaise while in international waters to protest French nuclear weapon tests in the South Pacific.
- July 2 – Following Pakistan's surrender to India in the Indo-Pakistani War of 1971, both nations sign the historic Simla Agreement, agreeing to settle their disputes bilaterally.
- July 4 – The first Rainbow Gathering is held in Colorado.
- July 10 – At least 24 people have been killed by elephants crazed by heat and drought in separate incidents in the Chandka Forest of India, according to news agency reports.
- July 11
  - The long anticipated chess match between world champion Boris Spassky of the Soviet Union, and United States champion Bobby Fischer, begins in Iceland at Reykjavík.
  - Curtis Mayfield releases the soundtrack to the 1972 film, Super Fly.
- July 10–14 – The Democratic National Convention meets in Miami Beach. Senator George McGovern, who backs the immediate and complete withdrawal of U.S. troops from South Vietnam, is nominated for president. He names fellow Senator Thomas Eagleton as his running mate.
- July 18 – Anwar Sadat expels 20,000 Soviet advisors from Egypt.
- July 21
  - The Troubles: Bloody Friday – 22 bombs planted by the Provisional Irish Republican Army explode in Belfast, Northern Ireland; nine people are killed and 130 seriously injured.
  - A collision between two trains near Seville, Spain, kills 76 people.
- July 22 - The Soviet probe Venera 8 lands on the surface of Venus and transmits data for 50 minutes about the planet's surface temperature and atmospheric pressure.
- July 23 – The United States launches Landsat 1, the first Earth-resources satellite.
- July 24 – Jigme Singye Wangchuck succeeds his father Jigme Dorji Wangchuck as King of Bhutan.
- July 25 – U.S. health officials admit that African-American men were used as guinea pigs in the Tuskegee Syphilis Study without their informed consent.
- July 27 – The McDonnell Douglas F-15 Eagle fighter aircraft makes its first flight in the United States.
- July 31 – The Troubles, Northern Ireland:
  - Operation Motorman 4:00 AM: The British Army begins to regain control of the "no-go areas" established by Irish republican paramilitaries in Belfast, Derry ("Free Derry") and Newry.
  - Claudy bombing ("Bloody Monday"), 10:00 AM: Three car bombs in Claudy, County Londonderry, kill nine. It becomes public knowledge only in 2010 that a local Catholic priest was an IRA officer believed to be involved in the bombings but his role was covered up by the authorities.

=== August ===
- August 4
  - Expulsion of Asians from Uganda: Dictator Idi Amin declares that Uganda will expel 50,000 Asians with British passports to Britain within 3 months. Most of their property is confiscated.
  - August 1972 solar storms: A huge solar flare (one of the largest ever recorded) knocks out cable lines in the U.S. It begins with the appearance of sunspots on August 2; an August 4 flare kicks off high levels of activity until August 10.
- August 10 – 1972 Great Daylight Fireball: A brilliant meteor is seen in the western U.S. and Canada as an Apollo asteroid skips off the Earth's atmosphere.
- August 12 – Oil tankers Oswego-Guardian and Texanita collide near Stilbaai, South Africa.
- August 14 – An East German Ilyushin airliner crashes near East Berlin; all 156 on board perish.
- August 16 – As part of a coup attempt, members of the Royal Moroccan Air Force fire upon, but fail to bring down, Hassan II of Morocco's plane while he is traveling back to Rabat.
- August 19 – The first daytime episode of the second incarnation of the American game show The Price Is Right is taped at CBS Television City, to be aired on September 4.
- August 21 – The Republican National Convention in Miami Beach, Florida, renominates U.S. President Richard Nixon and Vice President Spiro Agnew for a second term.
- August 22
  - Rhodesia is expelled by the International Olympic Committee for its racist policies.
  - In the Almirante Zar Naval Base, Argentina, 16 detainees are executed by firing squad in the Trelew massacre.
- August 26–September 10 – The 1972 Summer Olympics are held in Munich, West Germany.

=== September ===
- September 1
  - Bobby Fischer defeats Boris Spassky in a chess match in Reykjavík, Iceland, becoming the first American world chess champion.
  - The Second Cod War begins between the United Kingdom and Iceland.
- September 5–6 – Munich massacre: Eleven Israeli athletes at the 1972 Summer Olympics in Munich are murdered after eight members of the Arab terrorist group Black September invade the Olympic Village; five guerillas and one policeman are also killed in a failed hostage rescue.
- September 10 – Brazilian driver Emerson Fittipaldi wins the Italian Grand Prix at Monza and becomes the youngest Formula One World Champion at the age of 25.
- September 14 – West Germany and Poland renew diplomatic relations.
- September 23 – Philippine president Ferdinand Marcos announces on national television the issuance of Proclamation No. 1081 placing the entire country under martial law.
- September 24 – An F-86 fighter aircraft leaving an air show at Sacramento Executive Airport fails to become airborne and crashes into a Farrell's Ice Cream Parlour, killing 12 children and 11 adults.
- September 25 – 1972 Norwegian EC referendum: Norway rejects membership of the European Economic Community.
- September 28 – The Canada men's national ice hockey team defeats the Soviet national ice hockey team in the eighth and final game of the 1972 Summit Series 6–5 to win the series 4–3–1.
- September 29 – China–Japan relations: The Joint Communiqué of the Government of Japan and the Government of the People's Republic of China is signed in Beijing, which normalizes Japanese diplomatic relations with the People's Republic of China after breaking official ties with the Republic of China (Taiwan).

=== October ===
- October – In Somalia, the government of President Siad Barre formally introduces the Somali alphabet as the country's official writing script.
- October 1
  - The first publication reporting the production of a recombinant DNA molecule, by Paul Berg and colleagues, marks the birth of modern molecular biology methodology.
  - Alex Comfort's bestselling manual The Joy of Sex is published.
- October 2 – Denmark joins the European Community; the Faroe Islands stay out.
- October 5 – The United Reformed Church in England is founded out of the Congregational and Presbyterian Churches.
- October 6 – A train crash in Saltillo, Mexico, kills 208 people.
- October 8 – A major breakthrough occurs in the Paris peace talks between Henry Kissinger and Lê Đức Thọ.
- October 13 – Uruguayan Air Force Flight 571: A Fairchild FH-227D passenger aircraft transporting a rugby union team crashes at about 14,000 feet (4,300 m) in the Andes mountain range, near the Argentina/Chile border. Sixteen of the survivors are found alive December 20 but they have had to resort to cannibalism to survive.
- October 22 – The Oakland Athletics defeat the Cincinnati Reds four games to three to capture Major League Baseball's World Series. It is the Athletics' first championship since 1930, when the franchise was in Philadelphia.
- October 25 – Belgian Eddy Merckx sets a new world hour record in cycling in Mexico City.
- October 26 – A coup in the Republic of Dahomey (later Benin) led by Mathieu Kérékou removes a civilian government (which has been headed by a triumvirate consisting of Ahomadégbé, Apithy and Maga).
- October 28 – The Airbus A300 flies for the first time.

=== November ===
- November – The Nishitetsu Lions baseball club, part of the NPB's Pacific League, is sold to the Fukuoka Baseball Corporation, a subsidiary of Nishi-Nippon Railroad. The team is renamed the Taiheiyo Club Lions.
- November 7 – 1972 United States presidential election: Republican incumbent Richard Nixon defeats Democratic Senator George McGovern in a landslide. The election has the lowest voter turnout since 1948, with only 55 percent of the electorate voting.
- November 11 – Vietnam War: Vietnamization – The United States Army turns over the massive Long Binh military base to South Vietnam.
- November 14 – The Dow Jones Industrial Average closes above 1,000 (1,003.16) for the first time.
- November 16 – The United Nations Educational, Scientific and Cultural Organization adopts the Convention Concerning the Protection of the World Cultural and Natural Heritage.
- November 19 – Seán Mac Stíofáin, a leader of the Provisional Irish Republican Army, is arrested in Dublin after giving a radio interview to RTÉ and charged with being a member of the IRA.
- November 28 – The last executions in Paris, France. Roger Bontems and Claude Buffet – the Clairvaux Mutineers – are guillotined at La Santé Prison by chief executioner André Obrecht. Bontems, found not guilty of murder by the court, is condemned as Buffet's accomplice. President Georges Pompidou, in private an abolitionist, upholds both death sentences in deference to French public opinion.
- November 29
  - The "tea house" Mellow Yellow opens on the river Amstel in Amsterdam, pioneering the legal sale of cannabis in the Netherlands.
  - Atari in the United States release the production version of Pong, one of the first video games to achieve widespread popularity in both the arcade and home console markets, devised by Nolan Bushnell and Allan Alcorn.

=== December ===
- December 2 – 1972 Australian federal election: The Labor Party led by Gough Whitlam defeats the Liberal/Country Coalition government led by Prime Minister William McMahon. Consequently, Whitlam becomes the first Labor Prime Minister of Australia since the defeat of Ben Chifley in 1949. Whitlam will be sworn in on December 5; his first action using executive power is to withdraw all Australian personnel from the Vietnam War. McMahon resigns from the Liberal leadership almost immediately; he will be replaced by outgoing Treasurer Billy Snedden.
- December 7
  - Apollo 17 (Gene Cernan, Ronald Evans, Harrison Schmitt), the last crewed mission beyond low Earth orbit until the Artemis II lunar flyby in 2026, is launched to the Moon and The Blue Marble photograph of the Earth is taken. The mission also includes five mice.
  - Imelda Marcos, First Lady of the Philippines, is stabbed and seriously wounded by an assailant; her bodyguards shoot the assailant.
- December 8
  - United Airlines Flight 553 crashes short of a runway in Chicago, killing 43 of 61 passengers and two people on the ground. A day later, over $10,000 cash is found in the purse of Watergate conspirator Howard Hunt's wife, who was on board.
  - International Human Rights Day is proclaimed by the United Nations.
- December 11 – Apollo 17 lands on the Moon.
- December 14 – Apollo program: Eugene Cernan becomes the last person to walk on the Moon until 2028 at the earliest, after he and Harrison Schmitt complete the third and final extra-vehicular activity (EVA) of Apollo 17.
- December 15 – The United Nations Environment Programme is established as a specialized agency of the United Nations.
- December 16
  - The Constitution of Bangladesh comes into effect.
  - Mozambican War of independence: The Portuguese army kills 400 Africans in Tete, Mozambique.
- December 19 – Apollo program: Apollo 17 returns to Earth, concluding the program of lunar exploration.
- December 21 – Rhodesian Bush War: ZANLA troopers attack Altera Farm in north-east Rhodesia.
- December 22
  - Australia establishes diplomatic relations with China and East Germany.
  - A peace delegation that includes singer-activist Joan Baez and human rights attorney Telford Taylor visit Hanoi to deliver Christmas mail to American prisoners of war (they will be caught in the Christmas bombing of North Vietnam).
- December 23
  - The 6.2 M_{w} Nicaragua earthquake kills 5,000–11,000 people in the capital Managua. President Anastasio Somoza Debayle is later accused of not distributing millions of dollars worth of foreign aid.
  - Swedish Prime minister Olof Palme compares the American bombings of North Vietnam to Nazi massacres. The U.S. breaks diplomatic contact with Sweden.
  - Asker accident: Braathens SAFE Flight 239 crashes during approach to Oslo Airport, Fornebu, Norway; forty people on board are killed.
- December 28 – The bones of Nazi Party official Martin Bormann are discovered in Berlin during construction work.
- December 29 – Eastern Air Lines Flight 401 crashes into the Everglades in Florida, killing 101 of 176 on board. It is the first hull loss of a wide-body aircraft.
- December 31 – For the first and last time, a 2nd leap second is added (23:59:60) to a year, making 1972 366 days and two seconds long, the longest year ever within the context of UTC.

=== Date unknown ===
- Colombian looters find the lost 1st millennium city of Ciudad Perdida; it is not reached by official archaeologists until 1976.

== Births ==
=== January ===
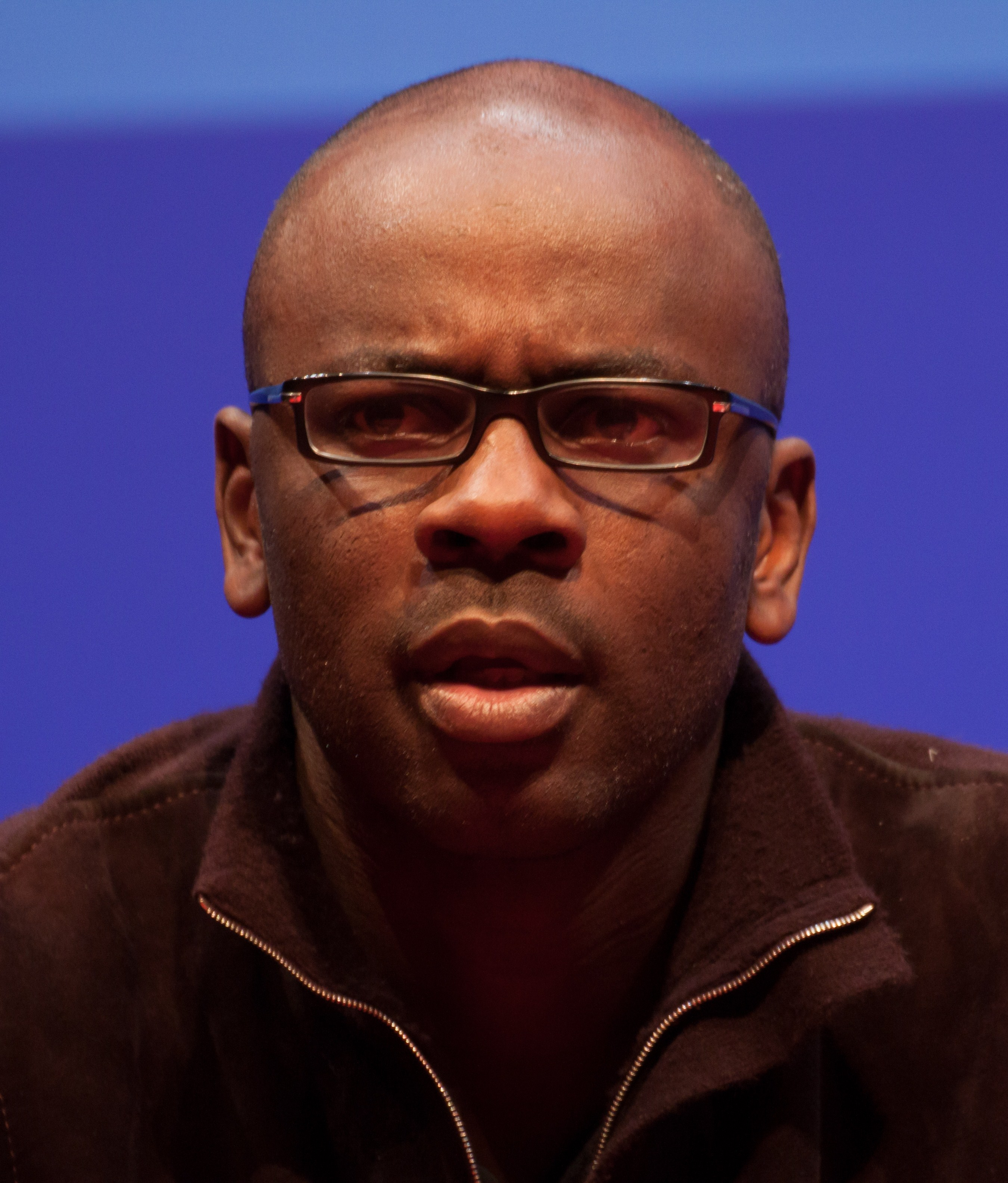
Lilian Thuram

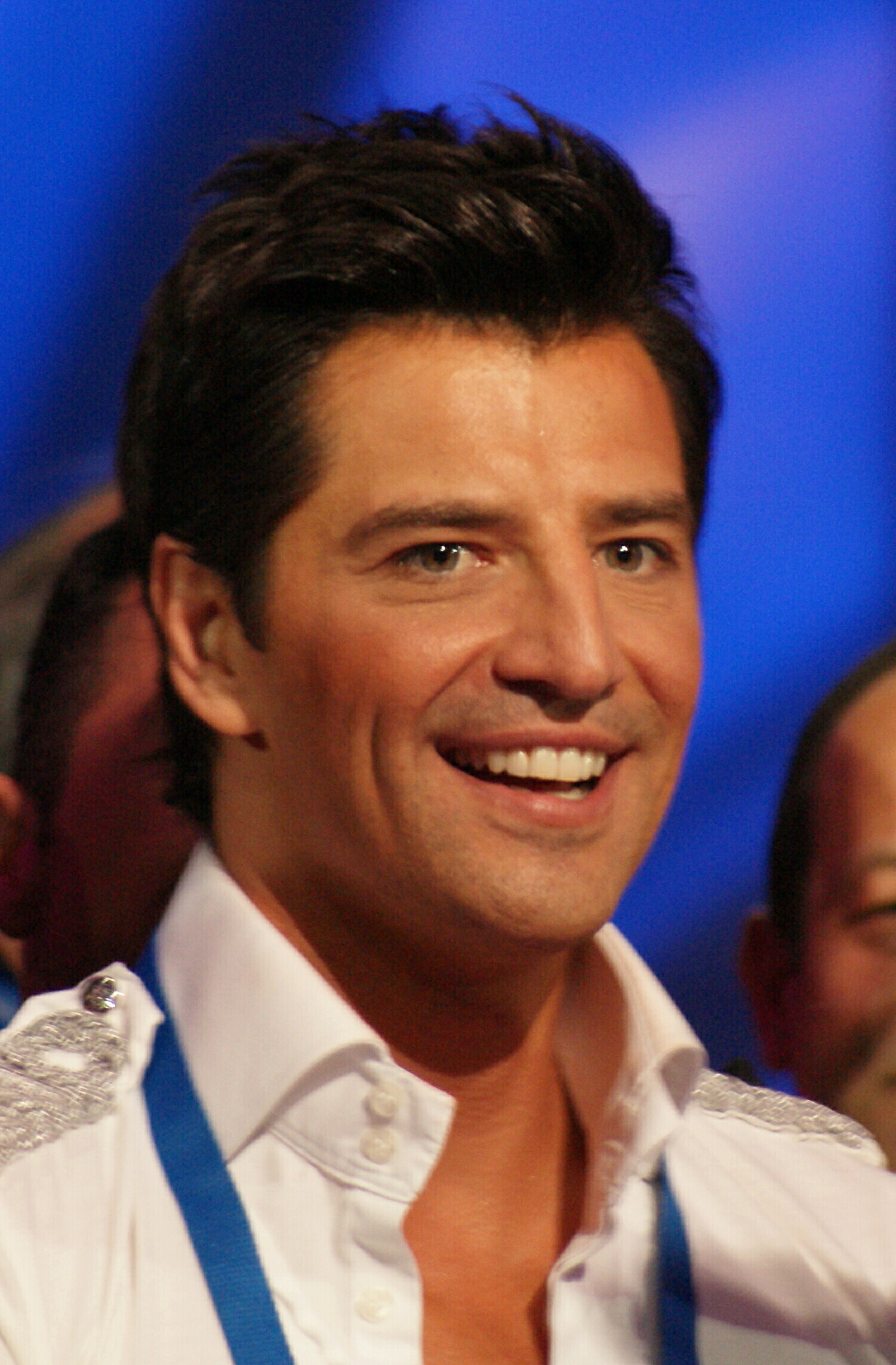
Sakis Rouvas

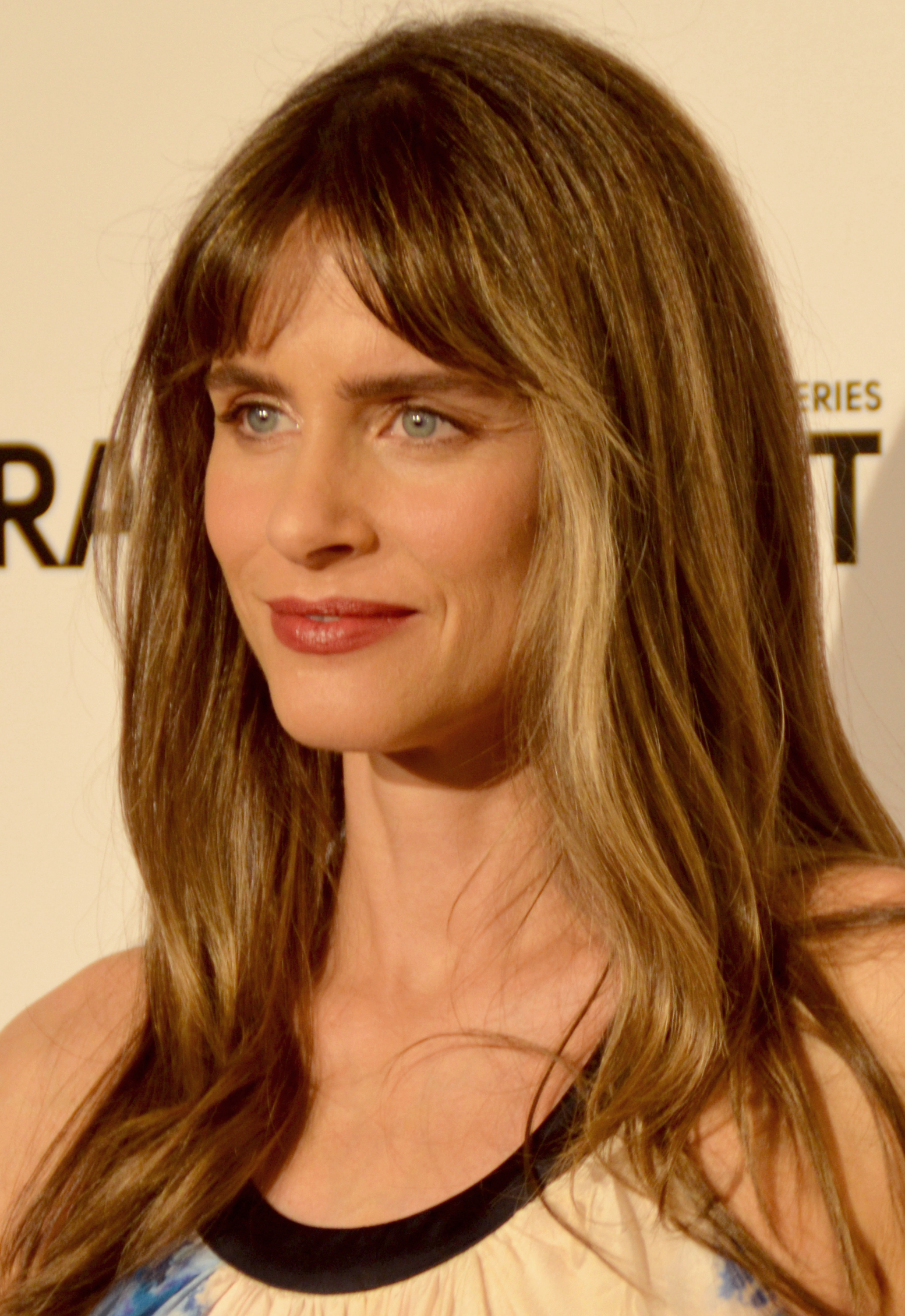
Amanda Peet

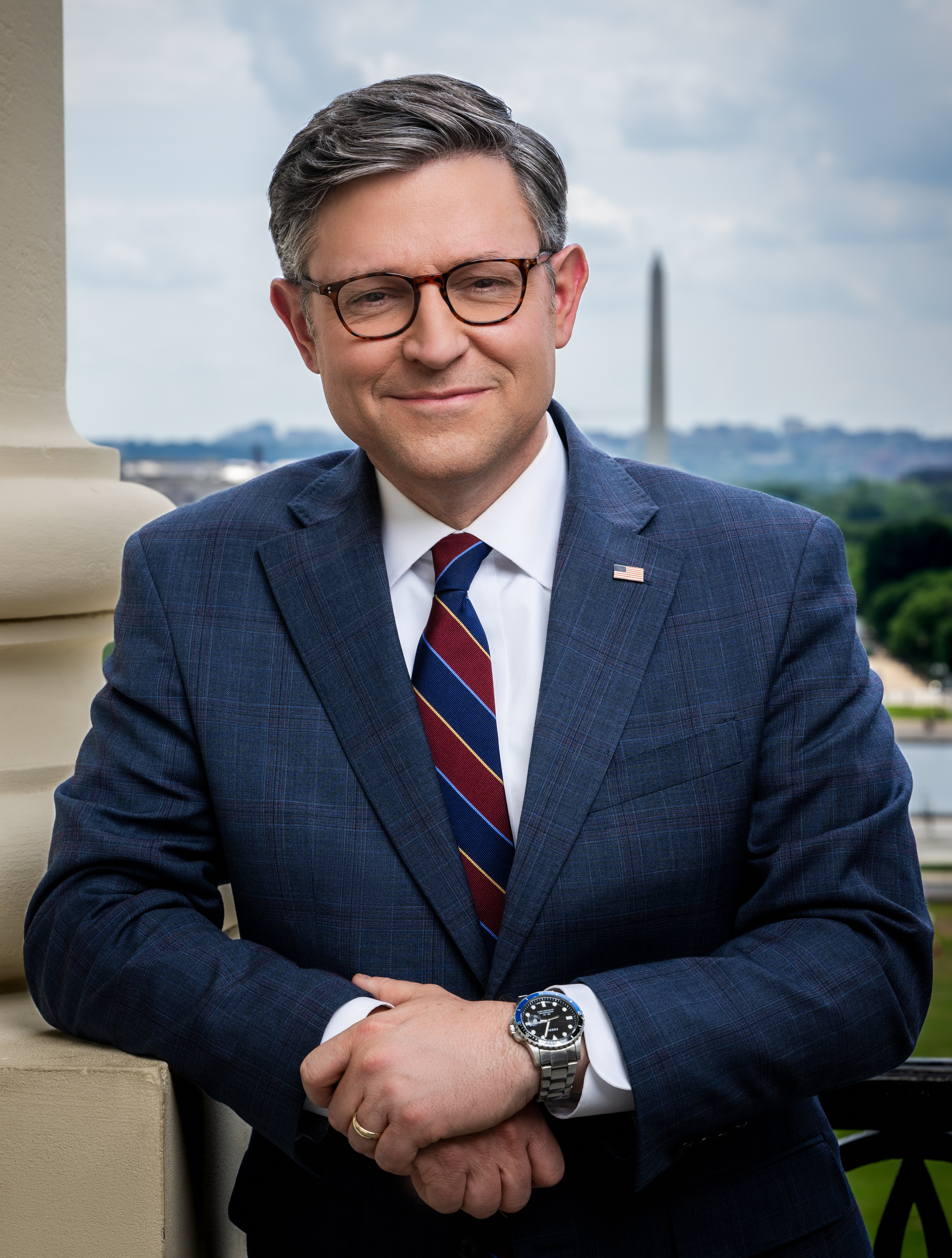
Mike Johnson

- January 1 – Lilian Thuram, French football player
- January 2 – Shiraz Minwalla, Indian theoretical physicist and string theorist
- January 5
  - Ariel McDonald, American-Slovenian basketball player
  - Sakis Rouvas, Greek recording, film and television artist, athlete and businessman
- January 10 – Thomas Alsgaard, Norwegian cross-country skier
- January 11 – Amanda Peet, American actress
- January 12 – Toto Wolff, Austrian racing driver and team principal
- January 13
  - Nicole Eggert, American actress
  - Vitaly Scherbo, Belarusian gymnast
- January 16 – Salah Hissou, Moroccan long-distance runner
- January 20 – Nikki Haley, Indian-American politician, Governor of South Carolina (2010–2017) and U.S. Ambassador to the United Nations (2017–2018)
- January 21 – Billel Dziri, Algerian footballer and manager
- January 22 – Gabriel Macht, American actor
- January 23 – Marcel Wouda, Dutch swimmer
- January 27
  - Bibi Gaytán, Mexican singer and actress
  - Mark Owen, British pop singer (Take That)
  - Keith Wood, Irish rugby player
- January 28 – Amy Coney Barrett, American attorney, jurist and associate justice, U.S. Supreme Court
- January 30 – Mike Johnson, 56th Speaker of the US House of Representatives

=== February ===
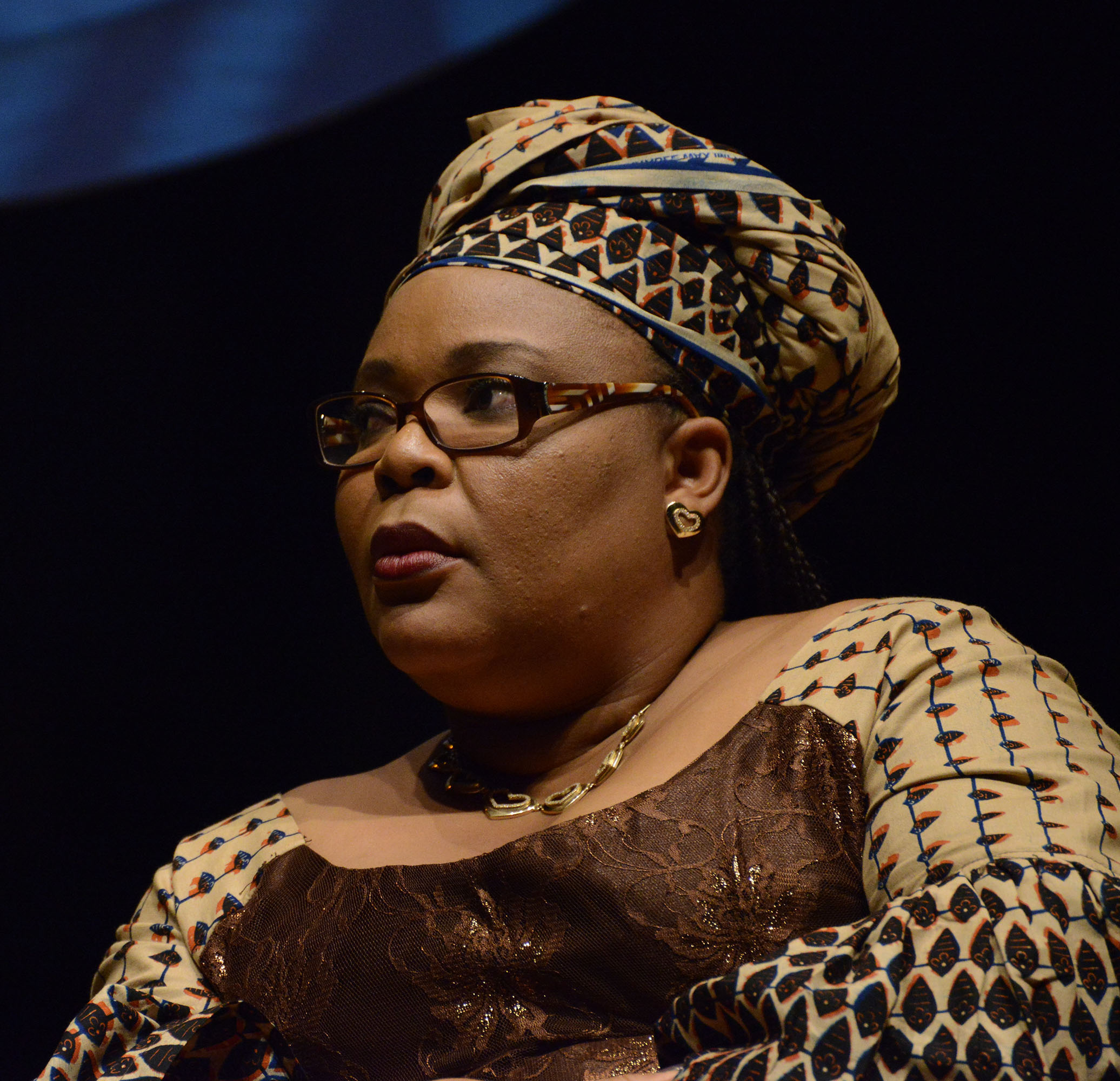
Leymah Gbowee

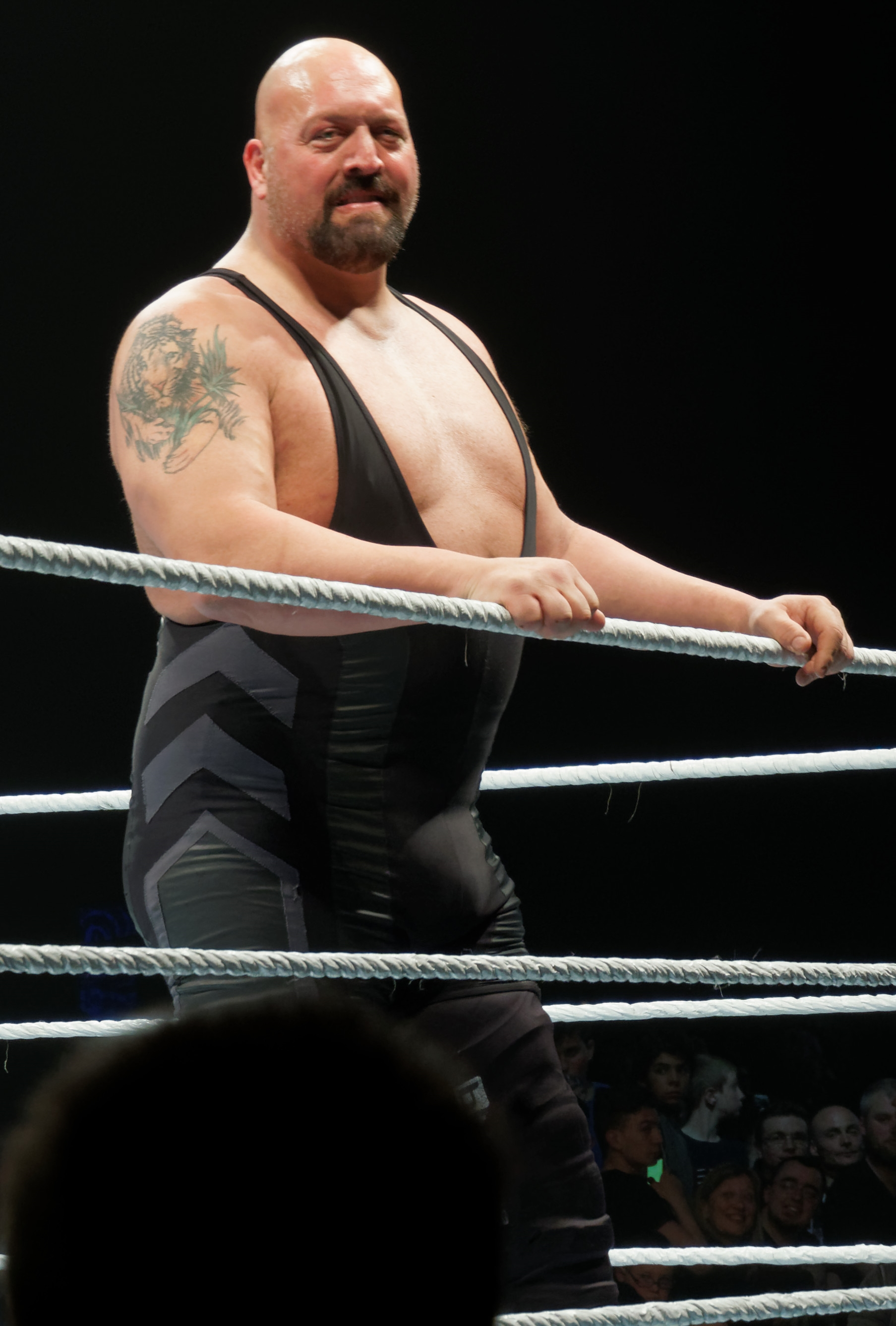
Big Show

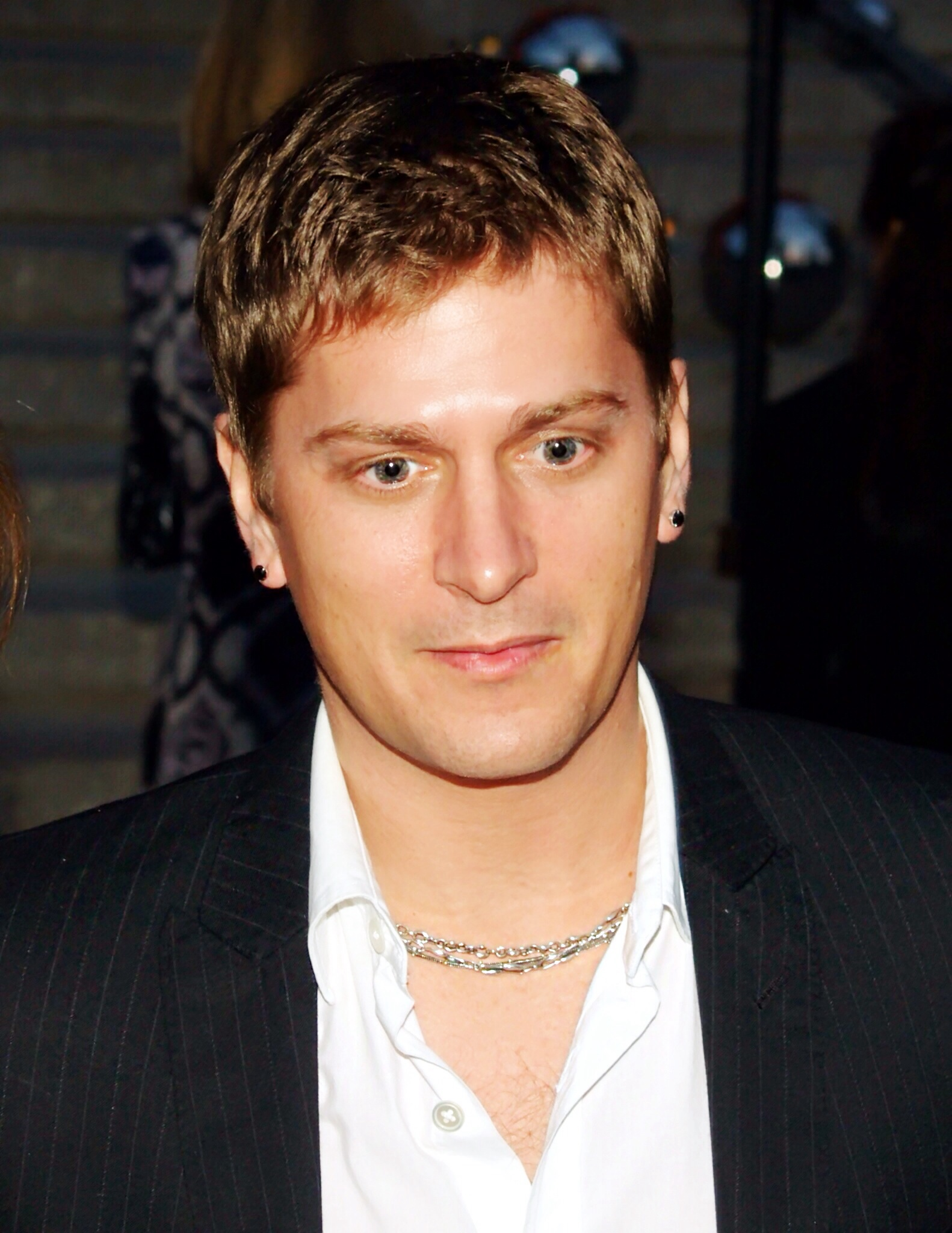
Rob Thomas

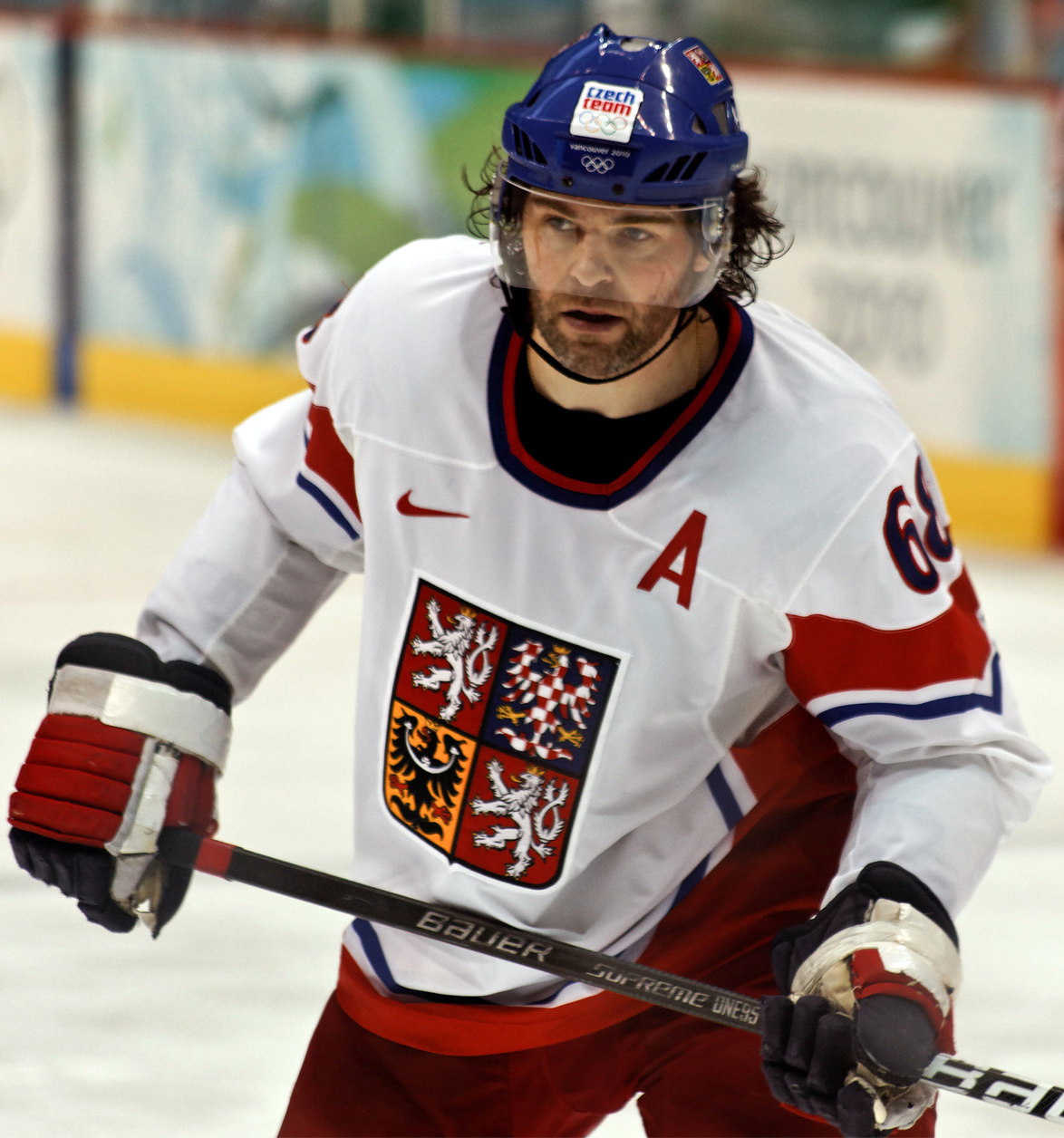
Jaromír Jágr

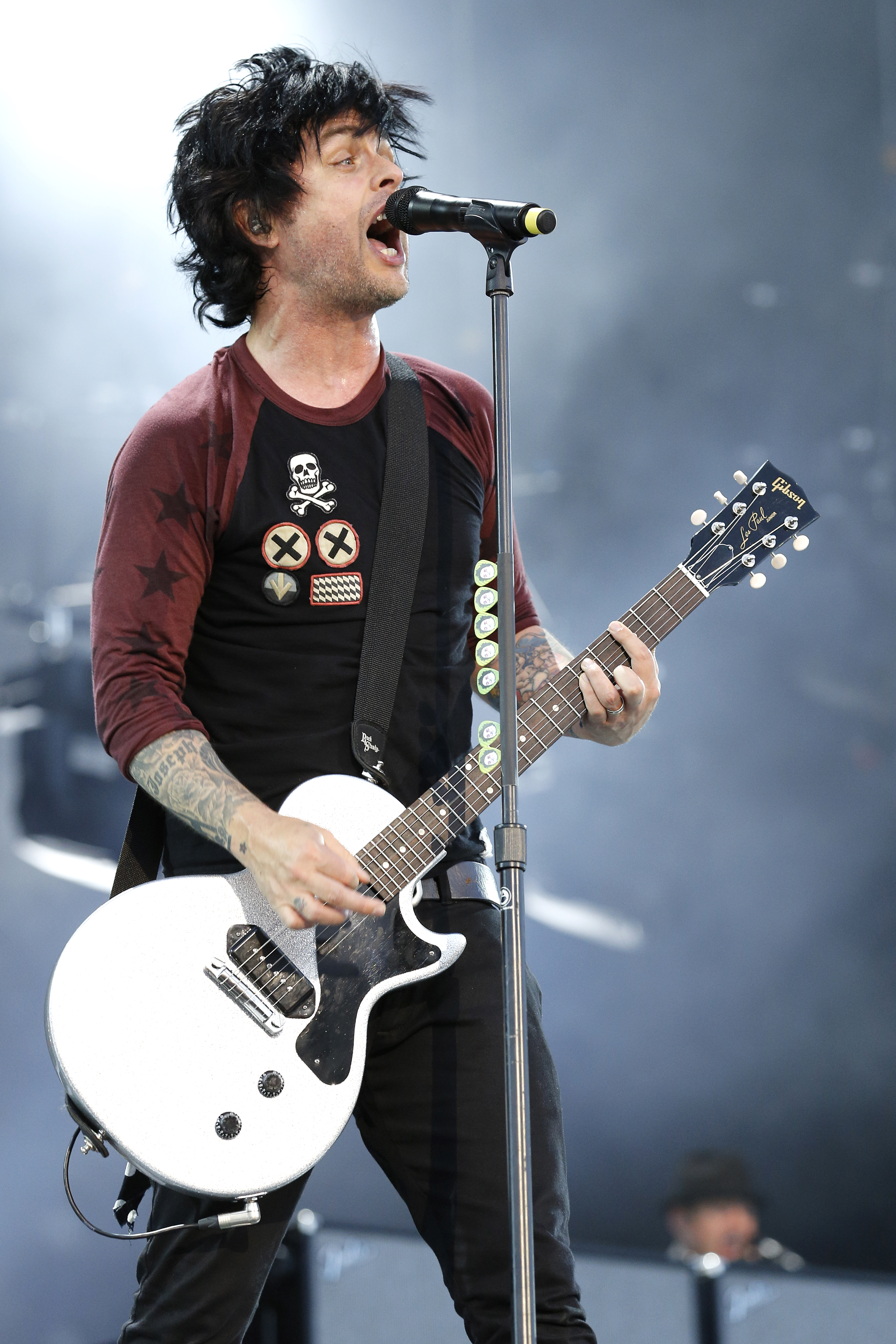
Billie Joe Armstrong

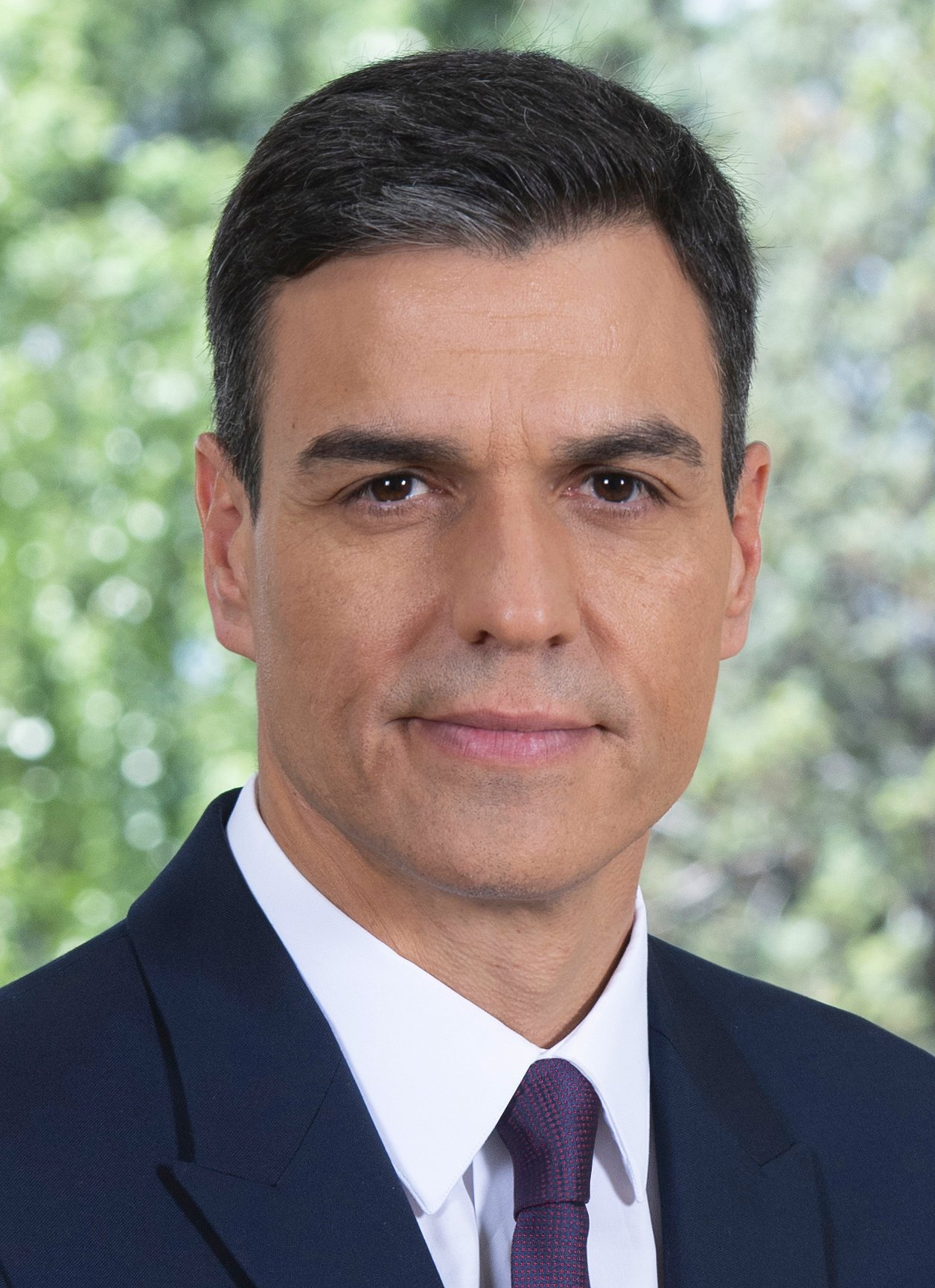
Pedro Sánchez

- February 1
  - Tego Calderón, Puerto Rican hip hop musician and actor
  - Leymah Gbowee, Liberian peace activist, Nobel Peace Prize laureate
- February 2
  - Klára Dobrev, Hungarian politician
  - Hendrick Ramaala, South African long-distance runner
- February 3 – Michael Kovrig, Canadian diplomat and hostage victim
- February 5 – Queen Mary of Denmark
- February 8 – Big Show, American professional wrestler
- February 9 – Norbert Rózsa, Hungarian swimmer
- February 11
  - Craig Jones, American sampler / keyboardist
  - Steve McManaman, British footballer
  - Kelly Slater, American professional surfer
- February 13
  - Virgilijus Alekna, Lithuanian discus thrower
  - Ana Paula Henkel, Brazilian beach volleyball player
- February 14 – Rob Thomas, American singer-songwriter (Matchbox Twenty)
- February 15 – Jaromír Jágr, Czech ice hockey player
- February 17
  - Billie Joe Armstrong, American rock musician and lead singer/guitarist (Green Day)
  - Taylor Hawkins, American musician (d. 2022)
  - Valeria Mazza, Argentinian model and businesswoman
- February 18 – Olexandra Timoshenko, Ukrainian rhythmic gymnast
- February 22
  - Michael Chang, American tennis player
  - Claudia Pechstein, German speed-skater
  - Haim Revivo, Israeli footballer
- February 24
  - Pooja Bhatt, Indian actress
  - Richard Chelimo, Kenyan athlete (d. 2001)
- February 26 – Keith Ferguson, American voice actor
- February 29
  - Dave Williams, American singer (d. 2002)
  - Pedro Sánchez, Spanish politician, Prime Minister 2018–

=== March ===
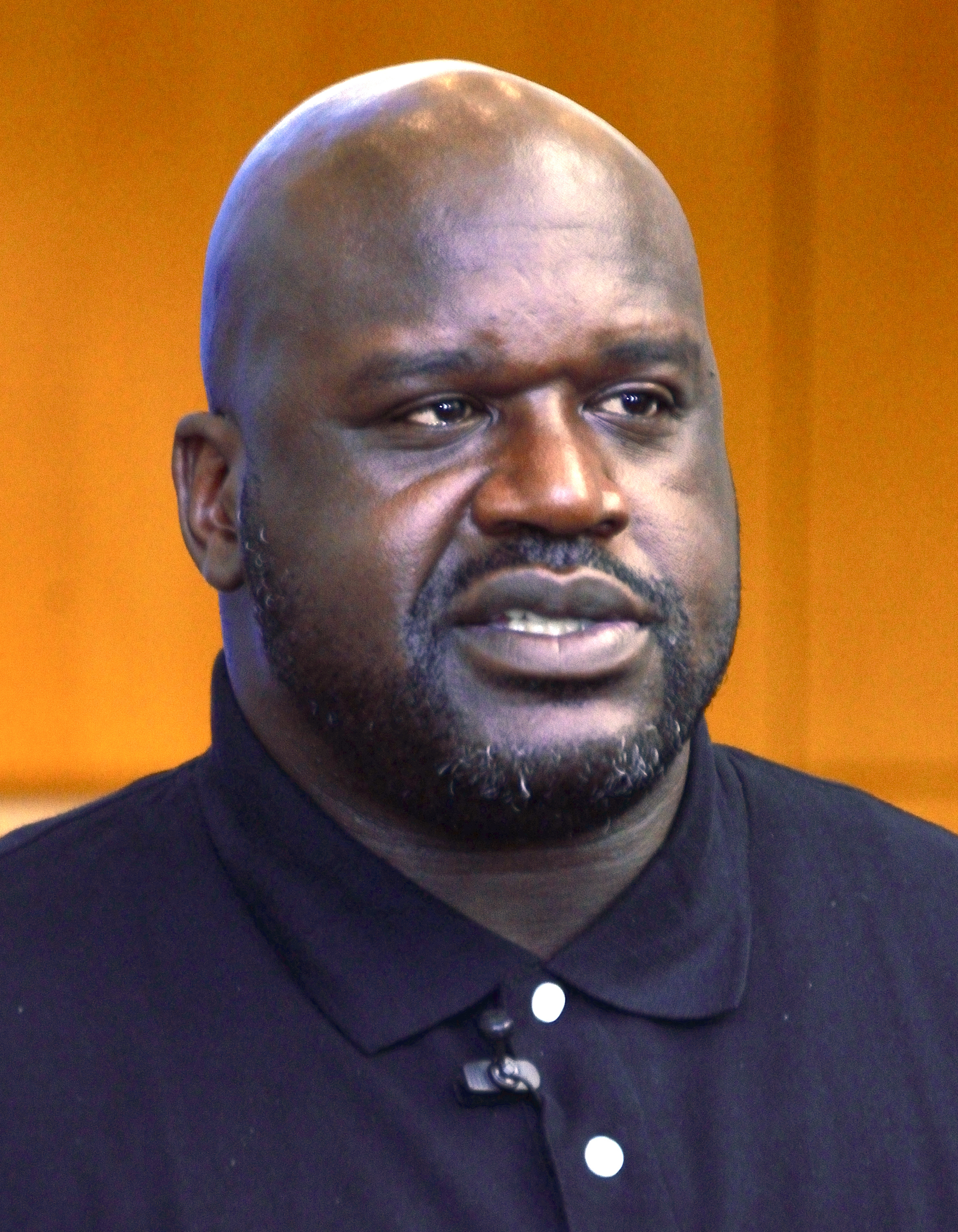
Shaquille O'Neal

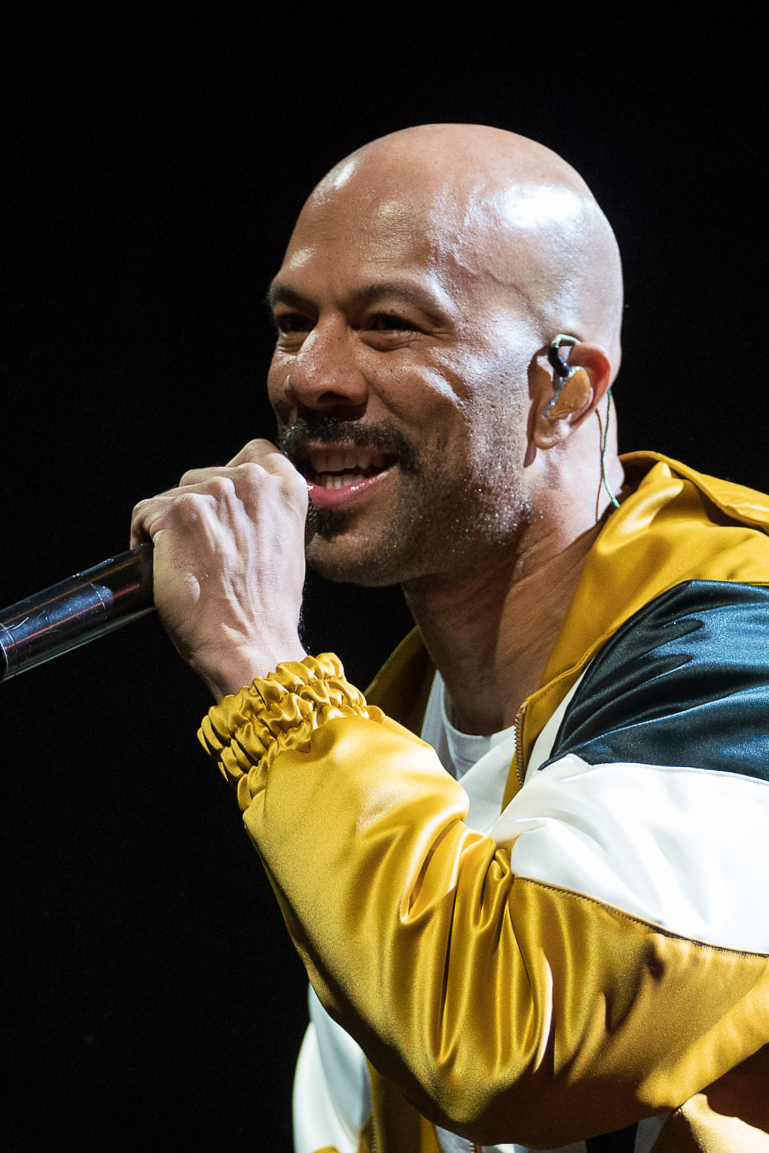
Common

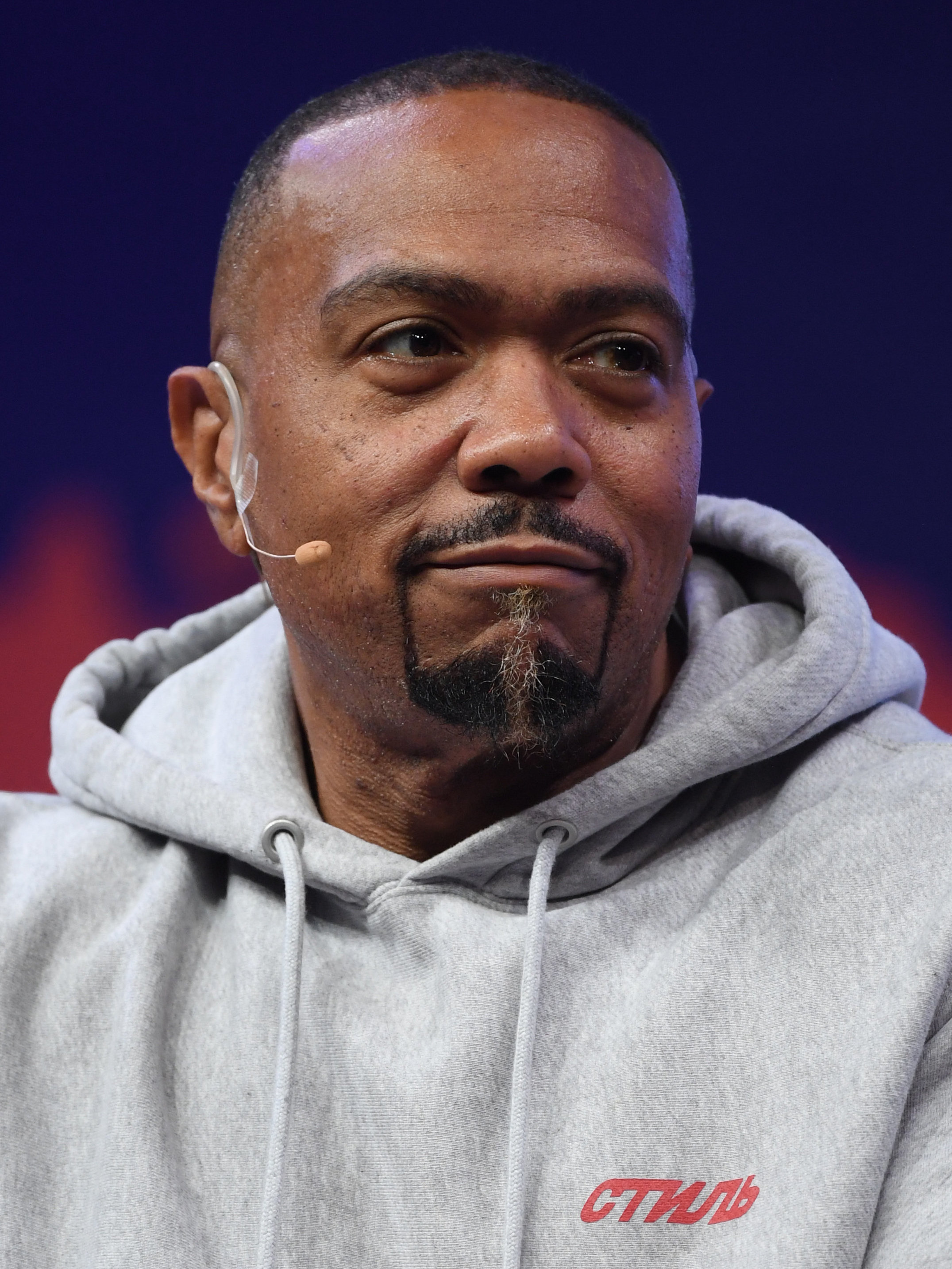
Timbaland

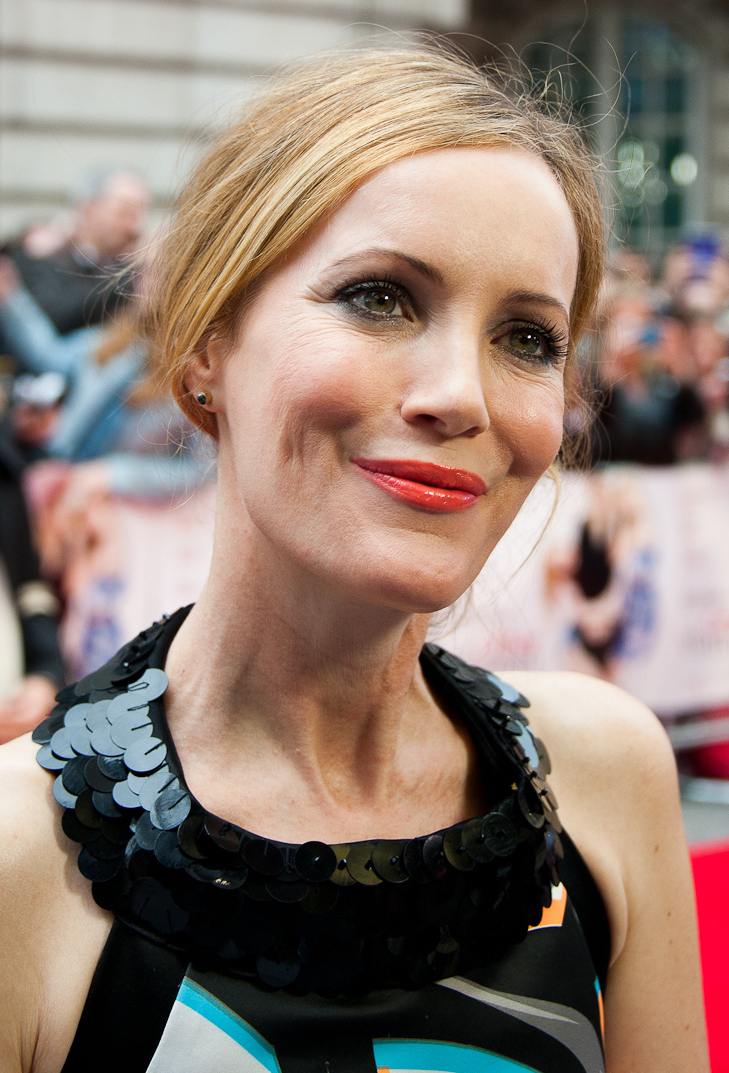
Leslie Mann

- March 4 – Pae Gil-su, North Korean gymnast
- March 6 – Shaquille O'Neal, American basketball player
- March 10 – Timbaland, American record producer, songwriter and rapper
- March 13
  - Leigh-Allyn Baker, American actress
  - Common, African-American rapper and actor
- March 15 – Mark Hoppus, American musician and bassist (blink-182)
- March 17 – Mia Hamm, American soccer player
- March 21
  - Balázs Kiss, Hungarian Olympic athlete
  - Derartu Tulu, Ethiopian long-distance runner
- March 22
  - Shawn Bradley, American basketball player
  - Elvis Stojko, Canadian figure skater
- March 23
  - Joe Calzaghe, Welsh boxer
  - Judith Godrèche, French actress
- March 25 – Naftali Bennett, Israeli politician
- March 26 – Leslie Mann, American actress
- March 27
  - Kieran Modra, Australian Paralympic swimmer and cyclist (d. 2019)
  - Charlie Haas, American professional wrestler
  - Jimmy Floyd Hasselbaink, Dutch footballer
- March 28 – Nick Frost, English actor, comedian and screenwriter
- March 29
  - Hera Björk, Icelandic singer
  - Rui Costa, Portuguese footballer
  - Priti Patel, British Indian politician, Secretary of State for the Home Department
- March 30 – Karel Poborský, Czech footballer

=== April ===
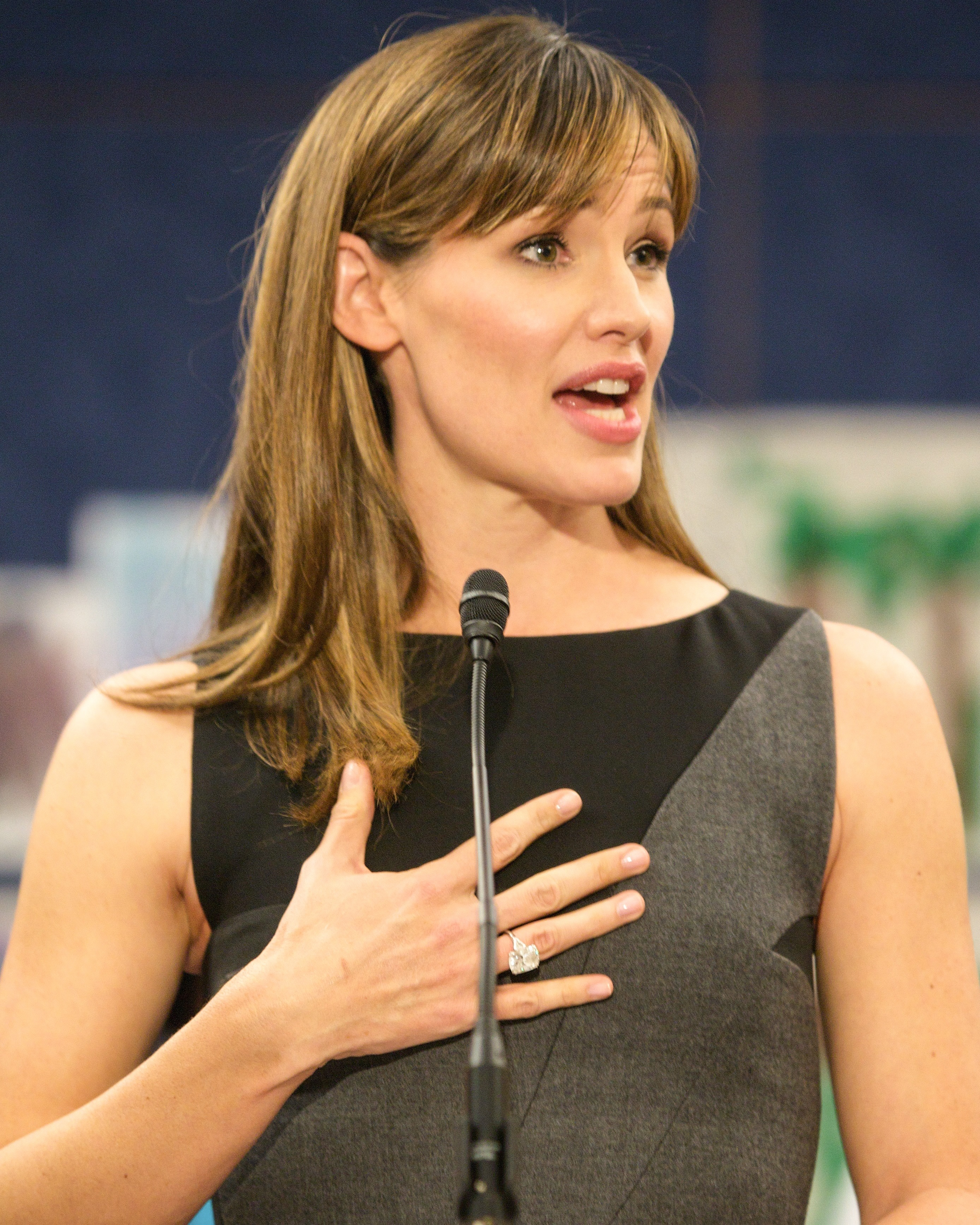
Jennifer Garner

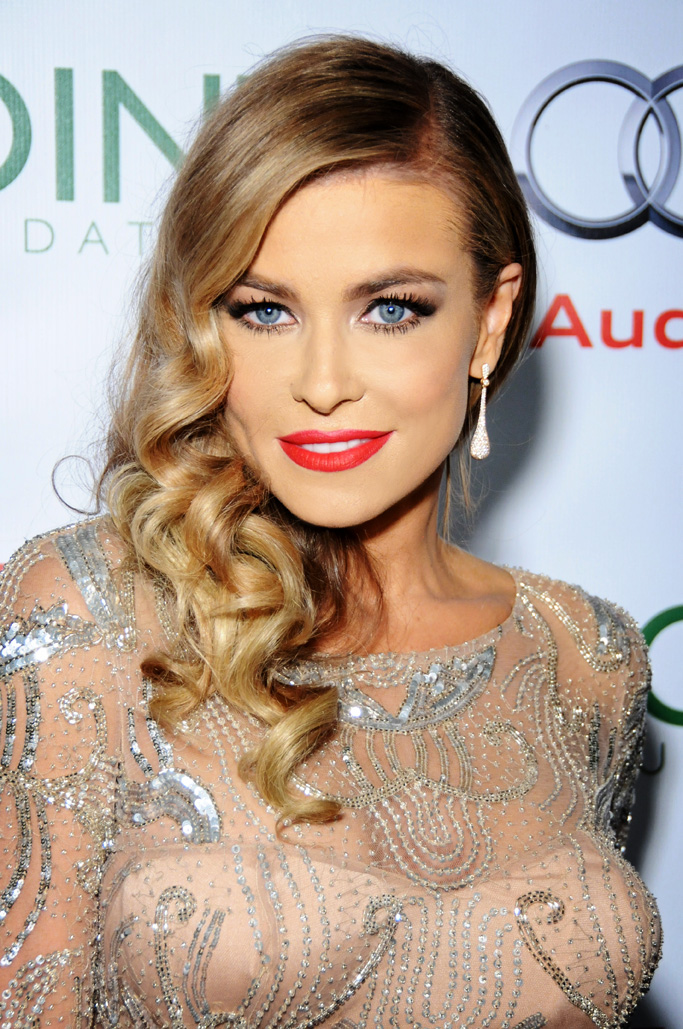
Carmen Electra

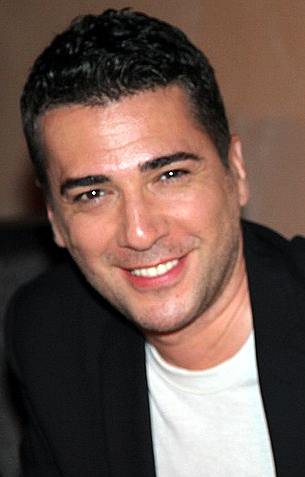
Željko Joksimović

- April 2 – Eyal Berkovic, Israeli footballer
- April 3 – Jennie Garth, American actress
- April 4 – Jill Scott, American singer-songwriter and model
- April 7 – Tim Peake, British astronaut
- April 10 – Vincent Zhao, Chinese actor and martial artist
- April 12 – Marco Goecke, German choreographer
- April 13 – Mariusz Czerkawski, Polish ice hockey player
- April 15 – Arturo Gatti, Canadian boxer (d. 2009)
- April 16 – Conchita Martínez, Spanish tennis player
- April 17
  - Jennifer Garner, American actress
  - Muttiah Muralitharan, Sri Lankan cricketer
- April 19 – Rivaldo, Brazilian footballer
- April 20
  - Lê Huỳnh Đức, Vietnamese footballer
  - Carmen Electra, American actress and singer
  - Željko Joksimović, Serbian singer, composer songwriter, multi-instrumentalist and producer
- April 21 – Narges Mohammadi, Iranian human rights activist, Nobel Peace Prize laureate
- April 26 – Avi Nimni, Israeli footballer

=== May ===
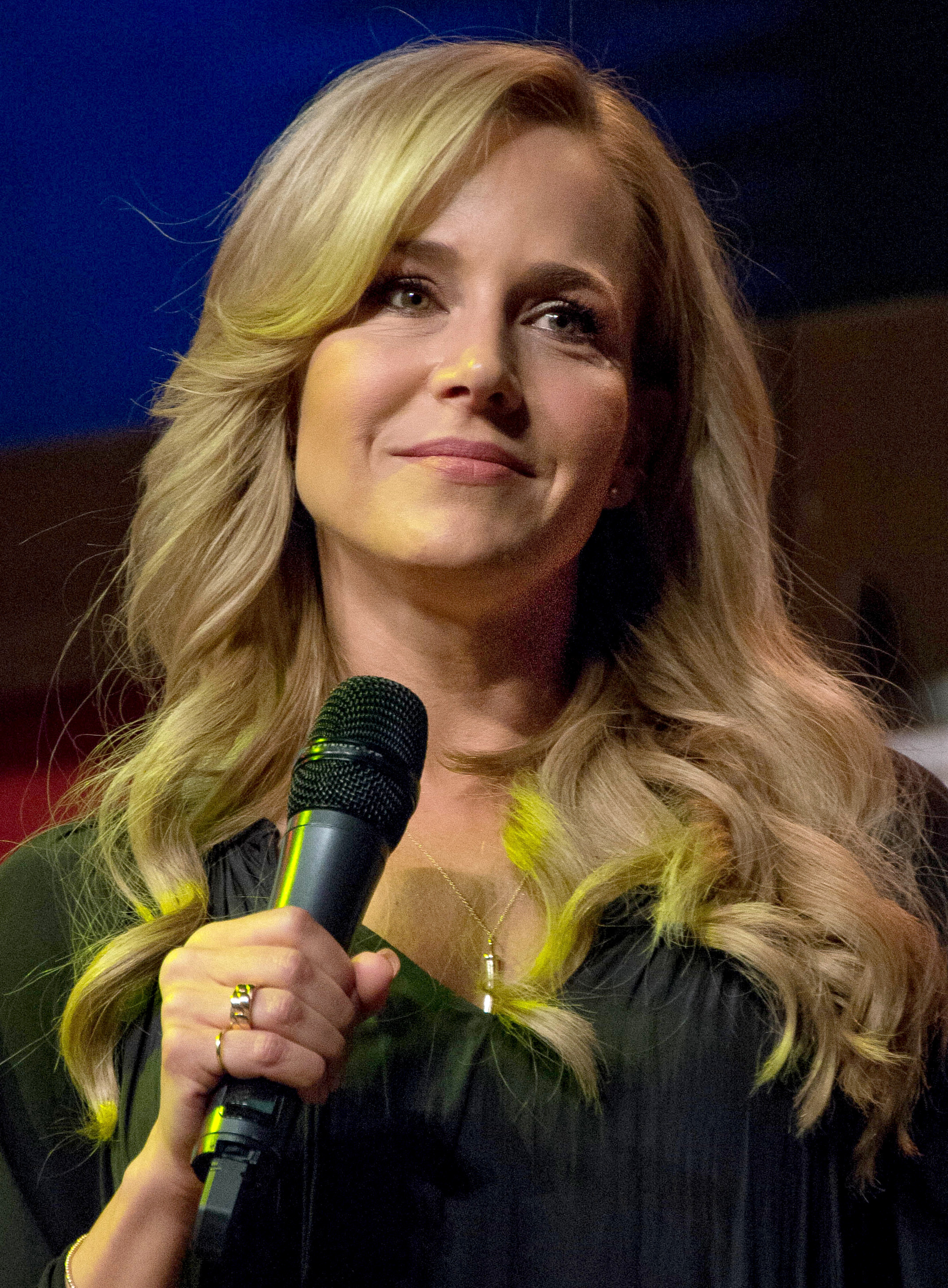
Julie Benz

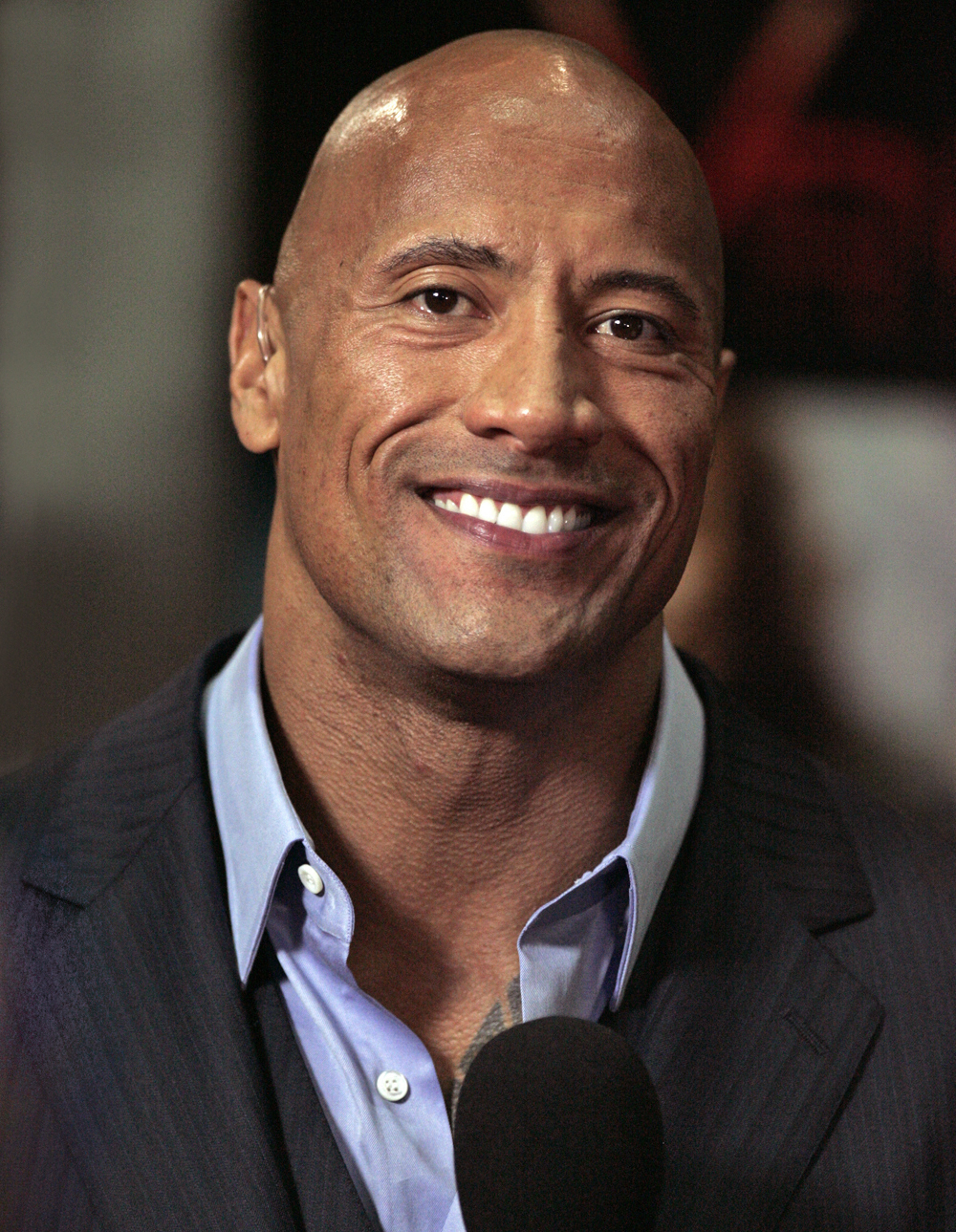
Dwayne Johnson

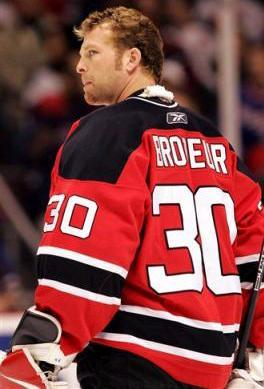
Martin Brodeur

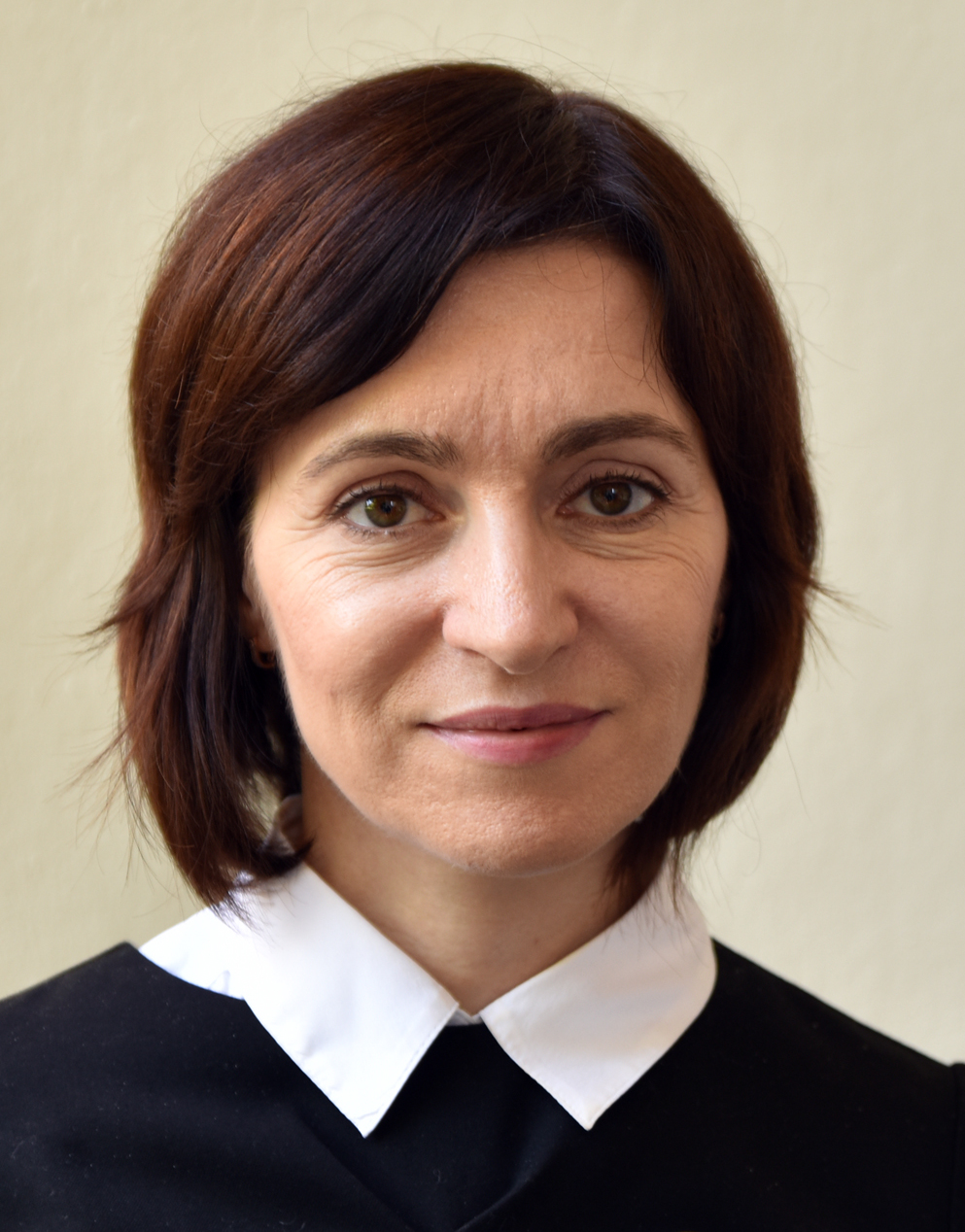
Maia Sandu

- May 1 – Julie Benz, American actress
- May 2 – Dwayne Johnson, American professional wrestler and actor
- May 3 – Steve Barclay, British politician
- May 4 – Mike Dirnt, American rock musician and bassist (Green Day)
- May 5
  - Devin Townsend, Canadian musician
  - James Cracknell, British Olympic rower
- May 6
  - Martin Brodeur, Canadian ice hockey goaltender
  - Naoko Takahashi, Japanese long-distance runner
- May 7 – Asghar Farhadi, Iranian film director
- May 8 – Darren Hayes, Australian musician
- May 9 – Daniela Silivaș, Romanian gymnast
- May 10 – Katja Seizinger, German alpine skier
- May 15 – Élisa Martin, French politician
- May 19
  - Jenny Berggren, Swedish rock singer (Ace of Base)
  - Özcan Deniz, Turkish actor, singer and composer
  - Claudia Karvan, Australian actress
- May 20 – Busta Rhymes, African-American rapper and actor
- May 21 – The Notorious B.I.G., African-American rapper (d. 1997)
- May 22 – Max Brooks, American horror author and screenwriter
- May 23
  - Rubens Barrichello, Brazilian racing driver
  - Kevin Ullyett, Zimbabwean tennis player
- May 24 – Maia Sandu, Prime Minister of Moldova
- May 25 – Karan Johar, Indian film director, producer and screenwriter
- May 28 – Michael Boogerd, Dutch cyclist
- May 29 – Laverne Cox, American actress and LGBTQ+ advocate
- May 30 – Manny Ramírez, Dominican baseball player
- May 31 – Frode Estil, Norwegian cross-country skier

=== June ===
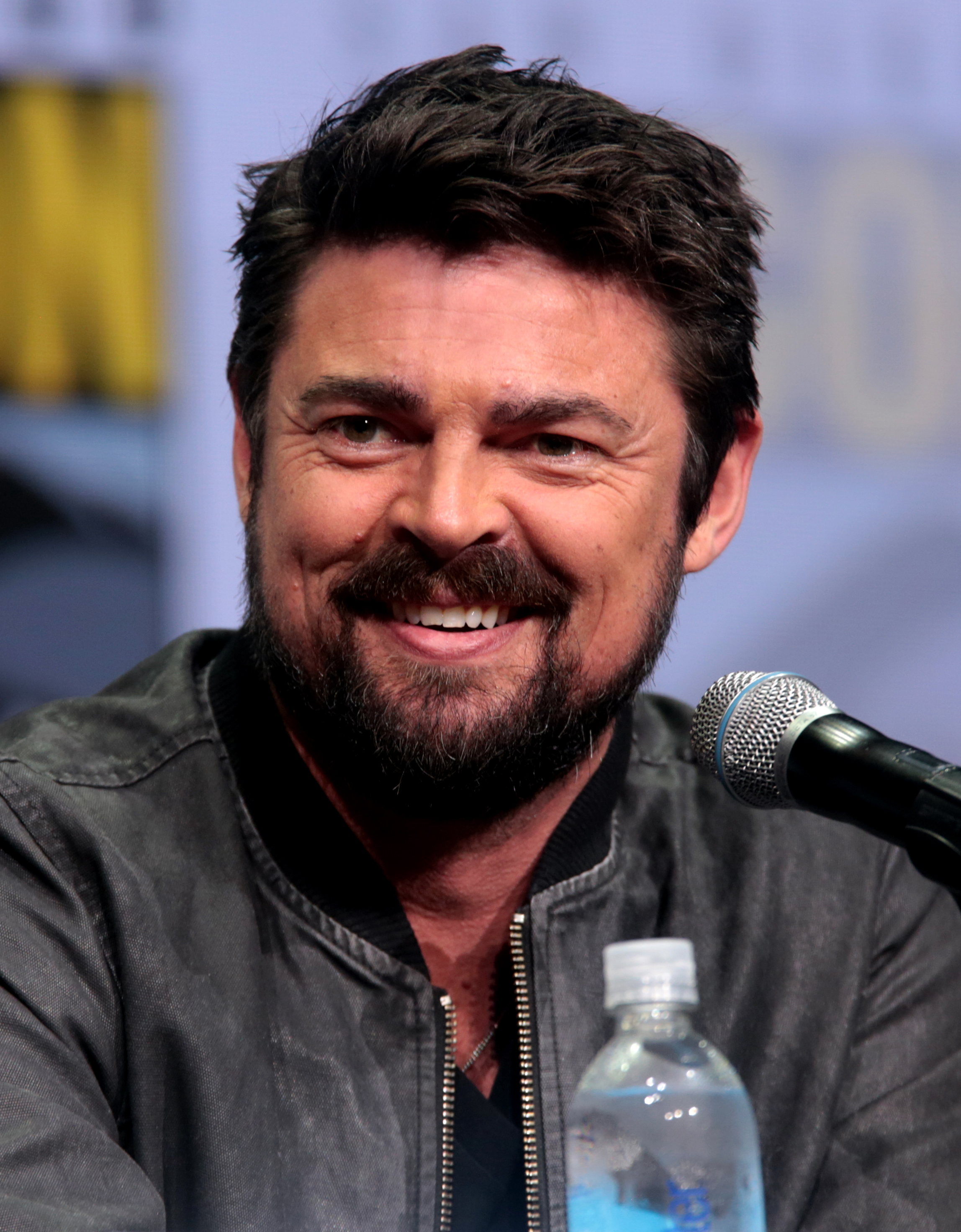
Karl Urban

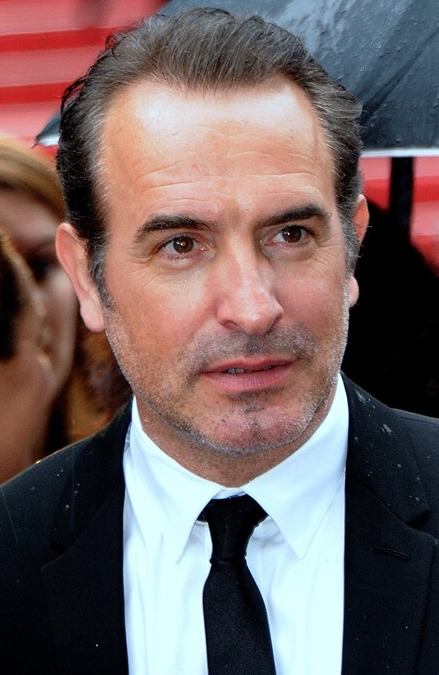
Jean Dujardin

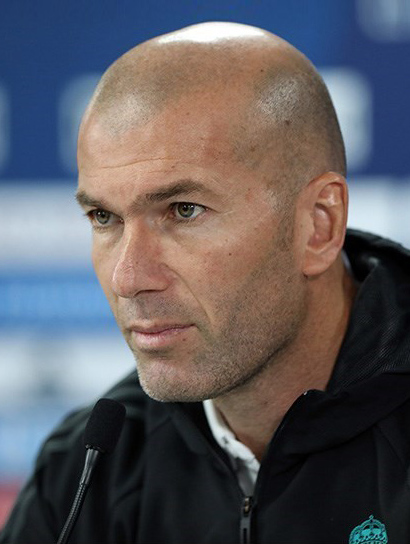
Zinedine Zidane

- June 2 – Wentworth Miller, British-born American actor and screenwriter
- June 4 – Stoja, Serbian singer
- June 5 – Yogi Adityanath, Indian priest and politician
- June 6
  - Noriaki Kasai, Japanese ski jumper
  - Natalie Morales, American journalist
- June 7 – Karl Urban, New Zealand actor
- June 16 – John Cho, Korean-American actor and musician
- June 17 – Iztok Čop, Slovenian rower
- June 19 – Jean Dujardin, French actor, comedian and film director
- June 21 – Irene van Dyk, South African born New Zealand netball player
- June 23 – Zinedine Zidane, French footballer and manager
- June 24
  - Robbie McEwen, Australian professional bicycle road racer
  - Kim Yeo-jin, South Korean actress and activist
- June 28
  - Geeta Tripathee, Nepali poet, lyricist and literary critic
  - Maria Butyrskaya, Russian figure skater
- June 29
  - DJ Shadow, American DJ and record producer
  - Samantha Smith, American peace activist (d. 1985)
- June 30
  - Molly Parker, Canadian actress

=== July ===
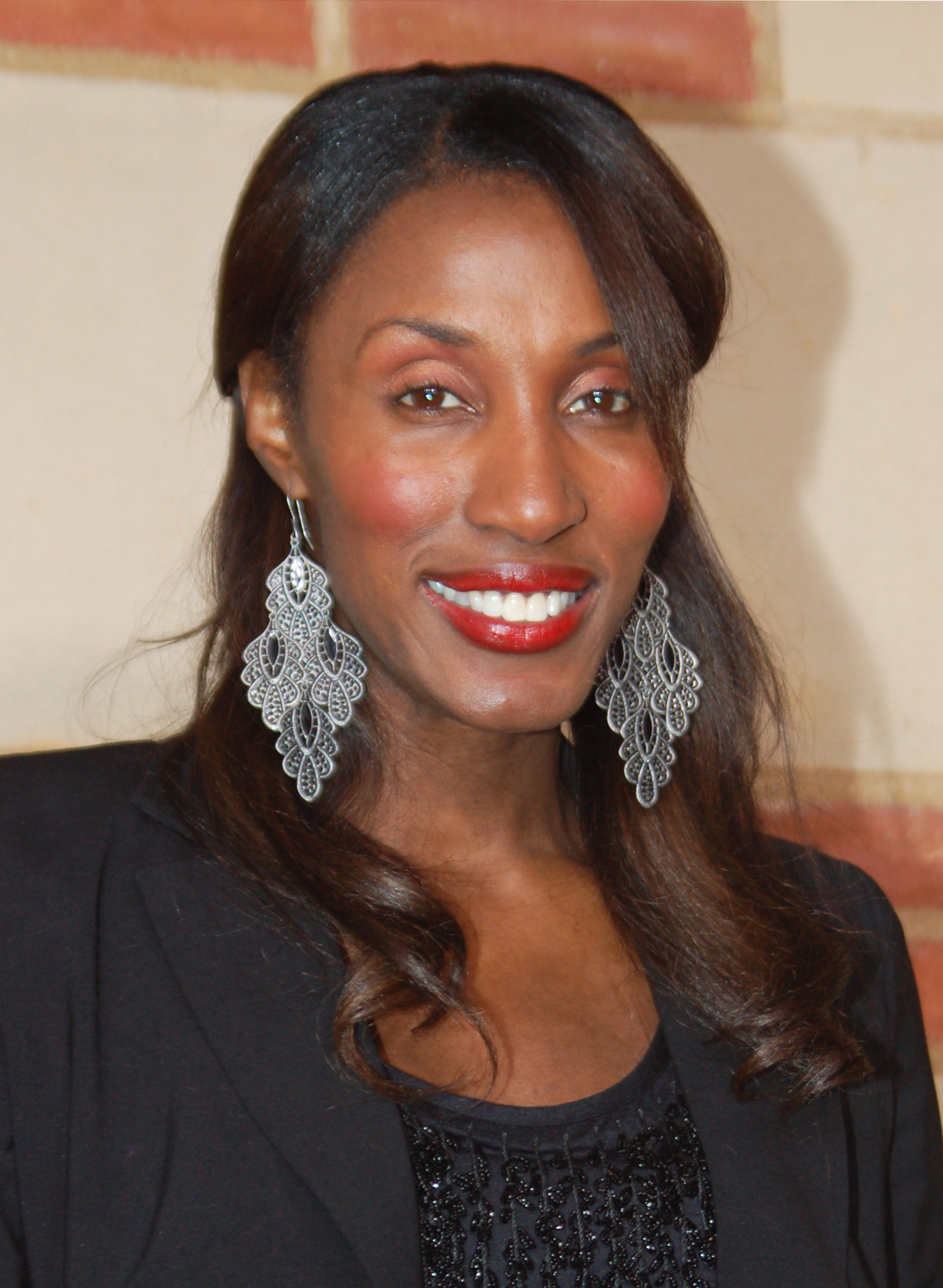
Lisa Leslie

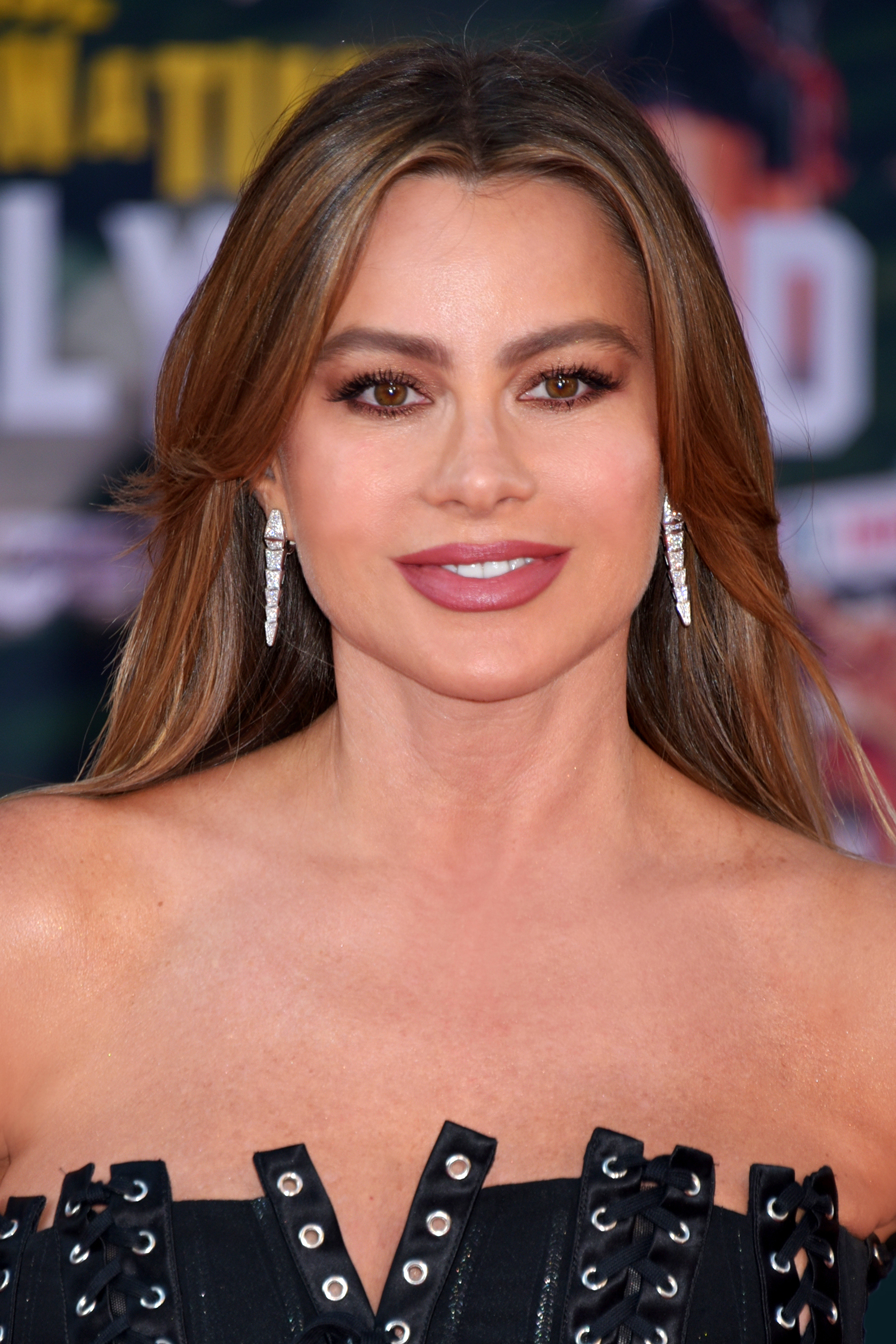
Sofía Vergara

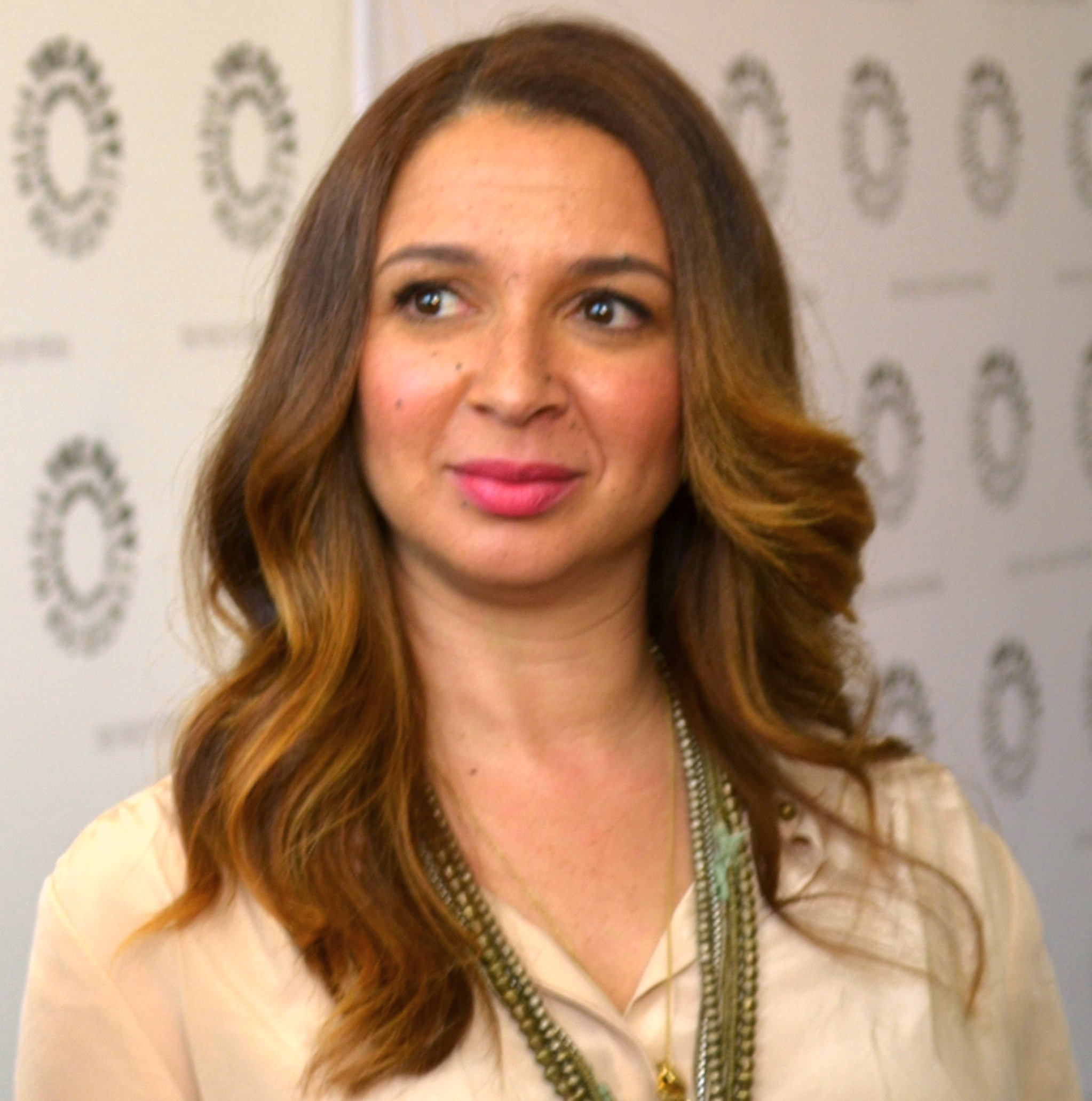
Maya Rudolph

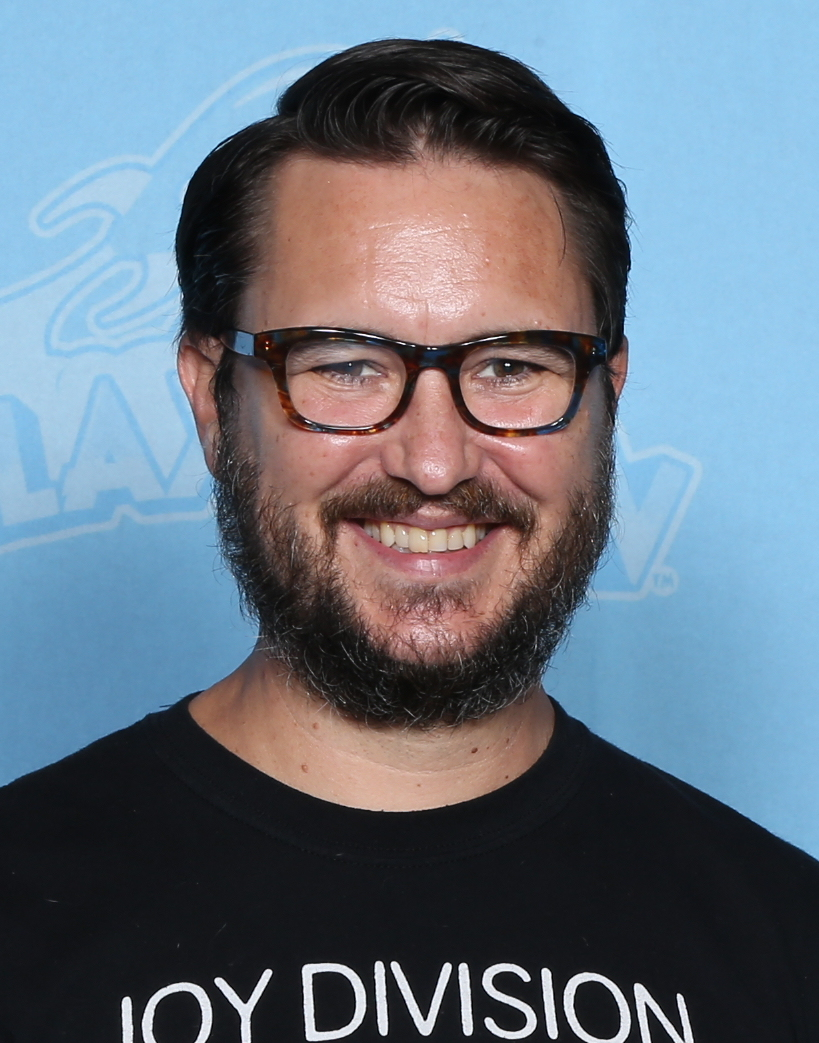
Wil Wheaton

- July 1 – Steffi Nerius, German javelin thrower
- July 4
  - Nina Badrić, Croatian pop singer
  - Alexei Shirov, Spanish chess Grandmaster
- July 5
  - Robert Esmie, Canadian Olympic athlete
  - Gary Shteyngart, Soviet-born American writer
- July 6
  - Isabelle Boulay, French Canadian singer
  - Zhanna Pintusevich-Block, Ukrainian sprinter
- July 7
  - Lisa Leslie, American basketball player
  - Kirsten Vangsness, American actress and writer
- July 8 – Sourav Ganguly, Indian cricketer
- July 10
  - Sofía Vergara, Colombian-American actress, television producer, comedian, presenter and model
  - Julián Legaspi, Uruguayan-Peruvian actor
- July 11 – Michael Rosenbaum, American actor, producer, singer and comedian
- July 17 – Jaap Stam, Dutch football player and coach
- July 21 – Catherine Ndereba, Kenyan long-distance runner
- July 22
  - Andrew Holness, 9th Prime Minister of Jamaica
  - Keyshawn Johnson, American football player
  - Nataša Ninković, Serbian actress
- July 23 – Marlon Wayans, American actor, comedian, producer and screenwriter
- July 27
  - Clint Robinson, Australian kayaker
  - Maya Rudolph, American actress, comedienne and singer
  - Sheikh Muszaphar Shukor, Malaysian orthopaedic surgeon and the first commercial astronaut
- July 29 – Wil Wheaton, American actor, blogger and writer

=== August ===
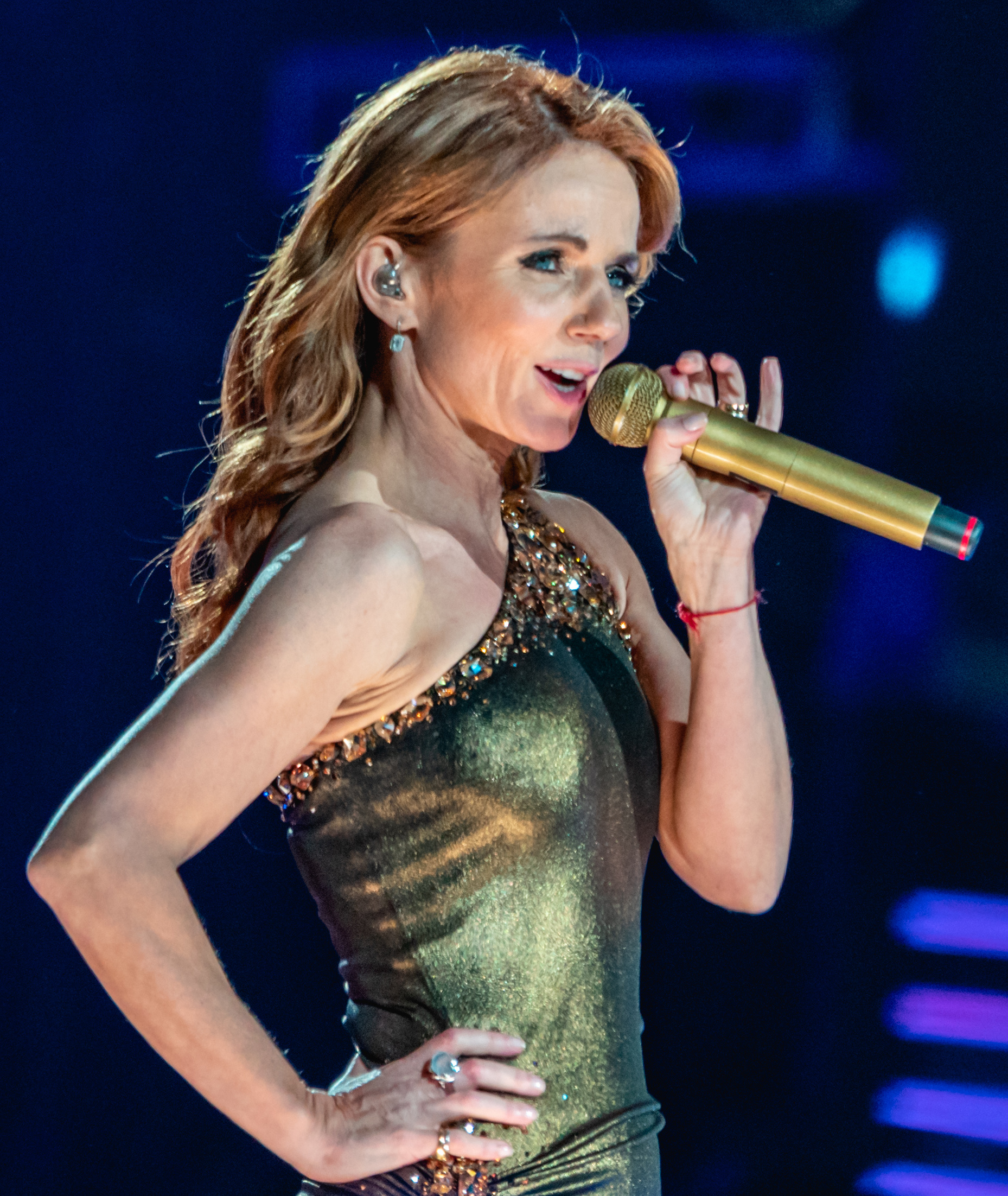
Geri Halliwell

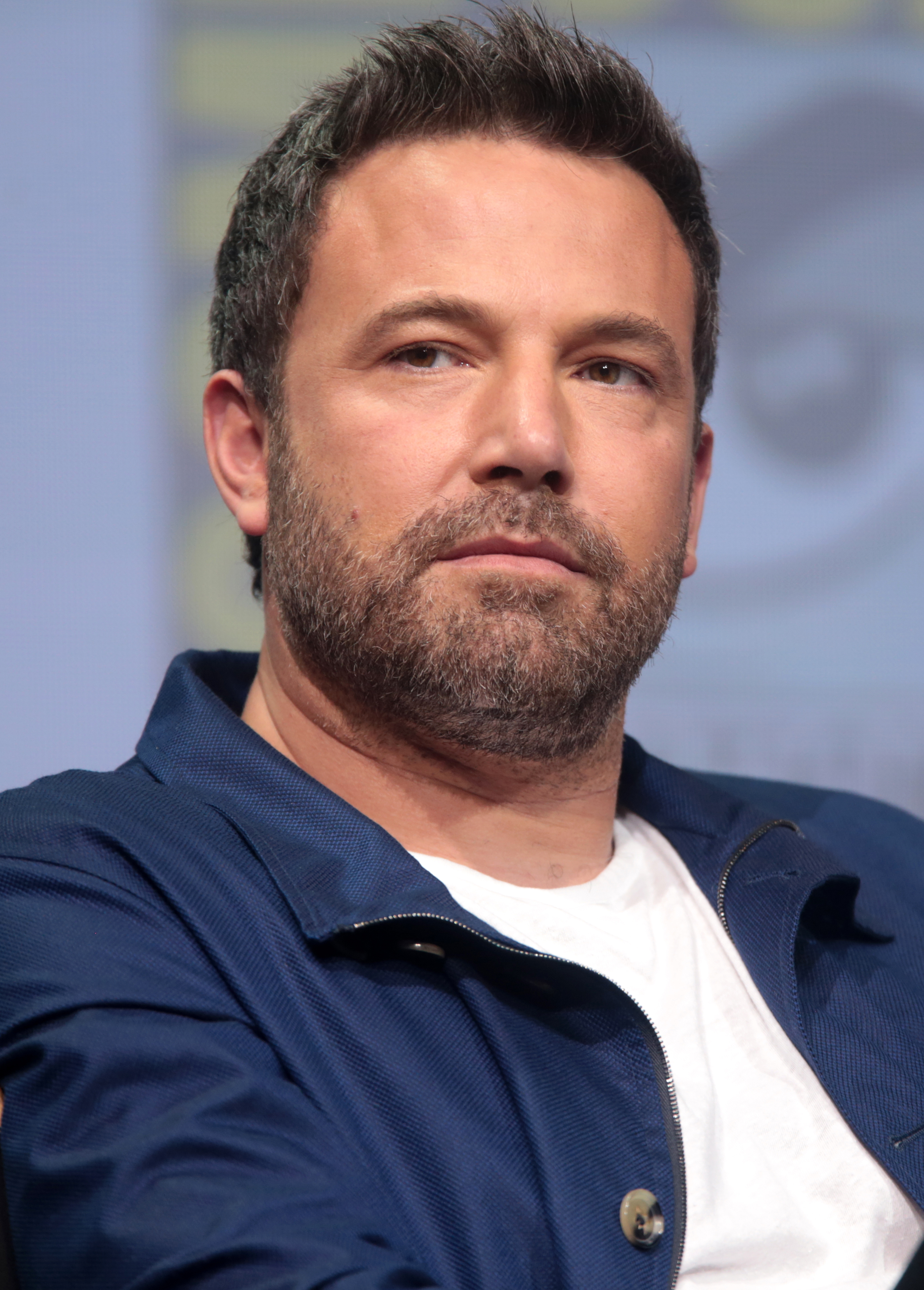
Ben Affleck

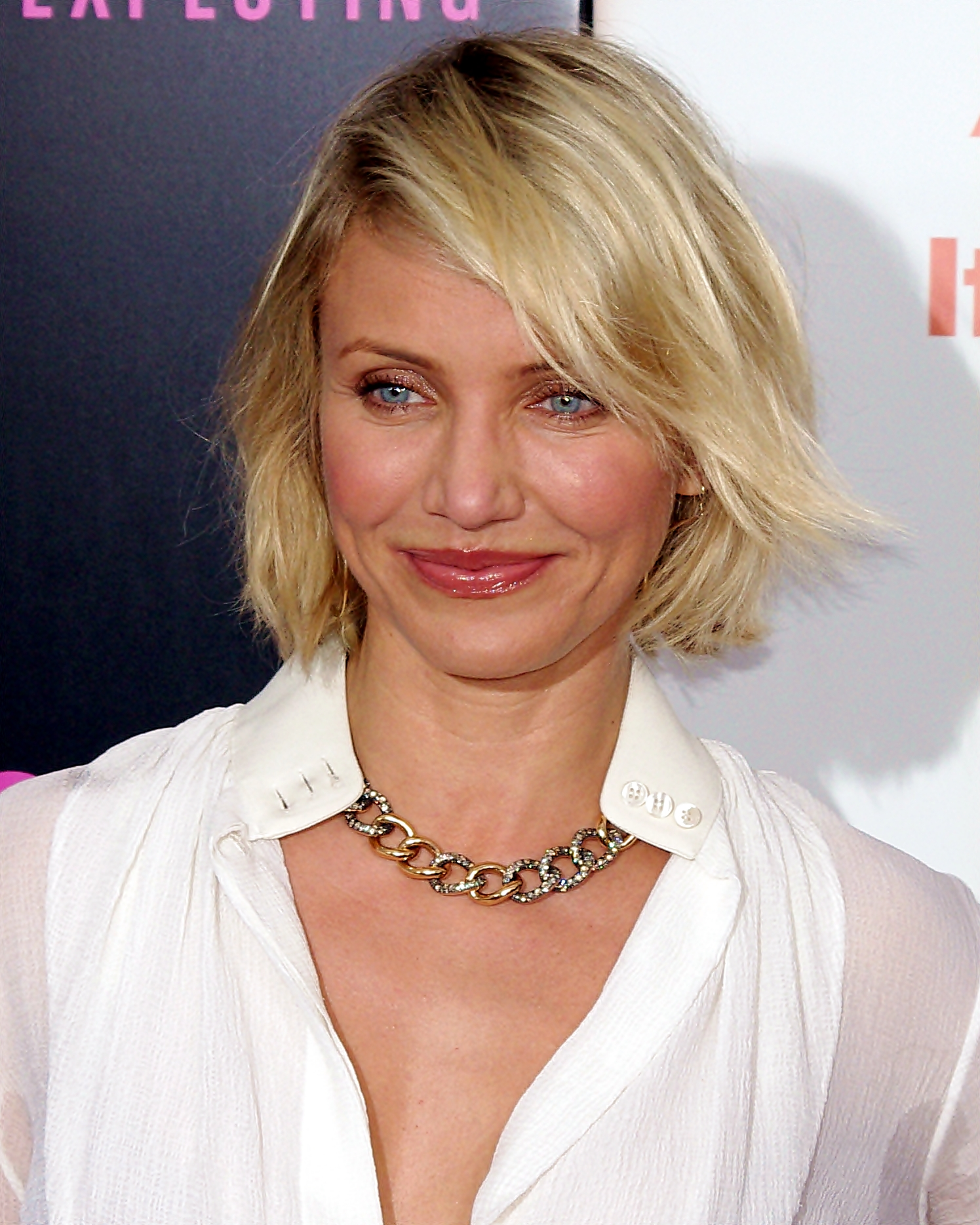
Cameron Diaz

- August 1 – Devon Hughes, American professional wrestler
- August 6 – Geri Halliwell, British pop singer (Spice Girls)
- August 7 – Chip Roy, American politician
- August 9
  - A-mei, Taiwanese singer
  - Ryan Bollman, American actor
- August 10 – Angie Harmon, American actress
- August 12 – Demir Demirkan, Turkish rock musician and songwriter
- August 13 – Michael Sinterniklaas, French-American voice actor
- August 14 – Yoo Jae-suk, South Korean comedian and television comedy show host
- August 15 – Ben Affleck, American actor and film director
- August 19
  - Roberto Abbondanzieri, Argentine footballer
  - Sammi Cheng, Hong Kong singer and actress
- August 27
  - Rhun ap Iorwerth, Welsh politician, First Minister of Wales
  - Denise Lewis, English track and field athlete
  - The Great Khali, Indian promoter, actor, powerlifter and professional wrestler
- August 29 – Bae Yong-joon, South Korean actor
- August 30
  - Cameron Diaz, American actress
  - Pavel Nedvěd, Czech footballer

=== September ===
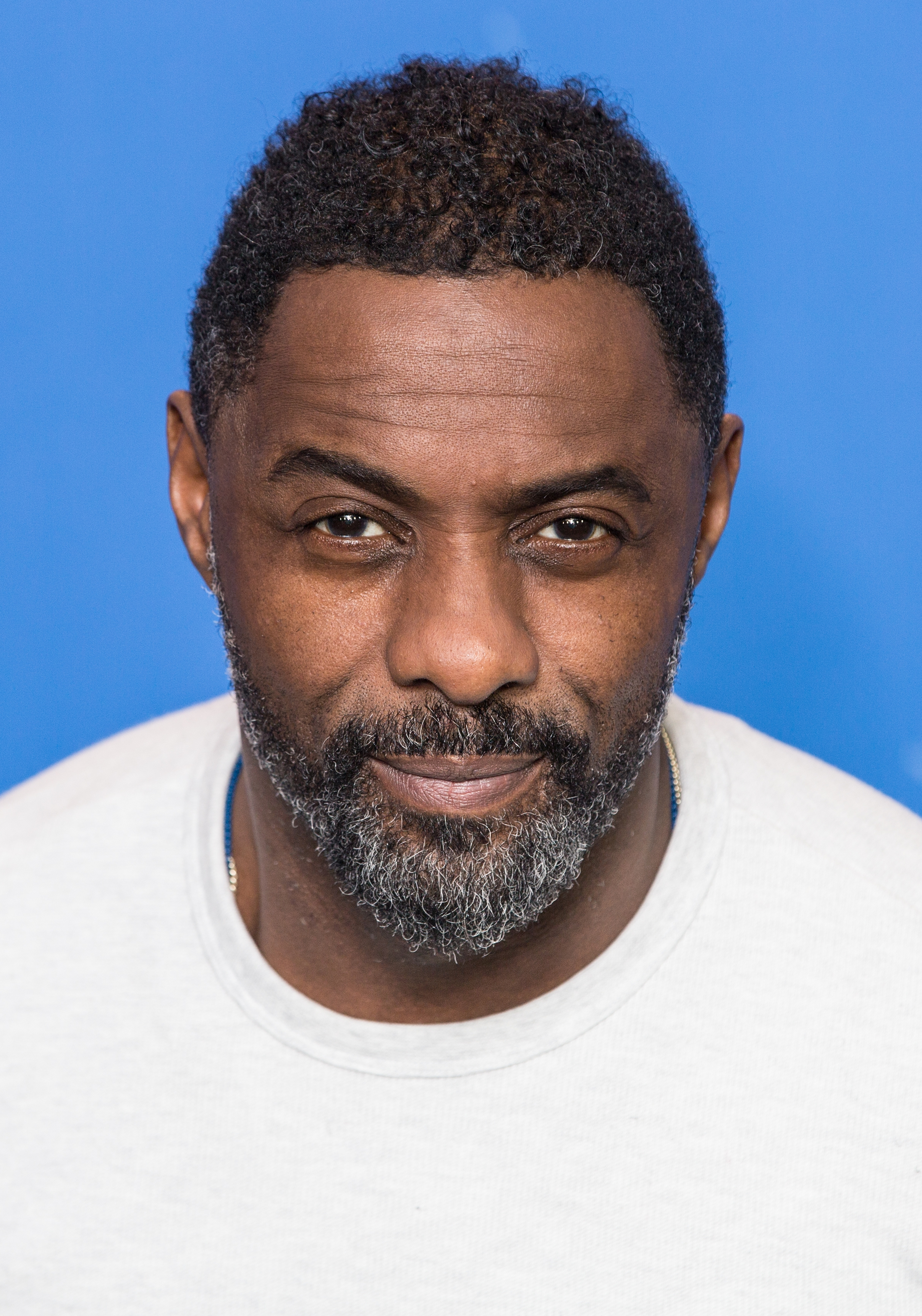
Idris Elba

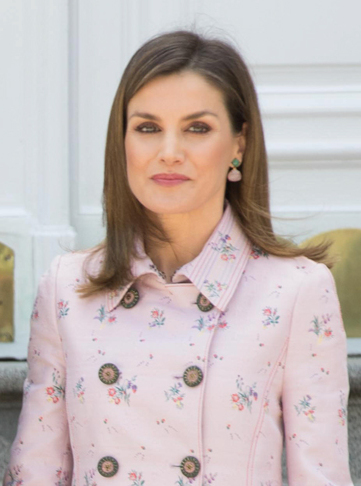
Queen Letizia of Spain

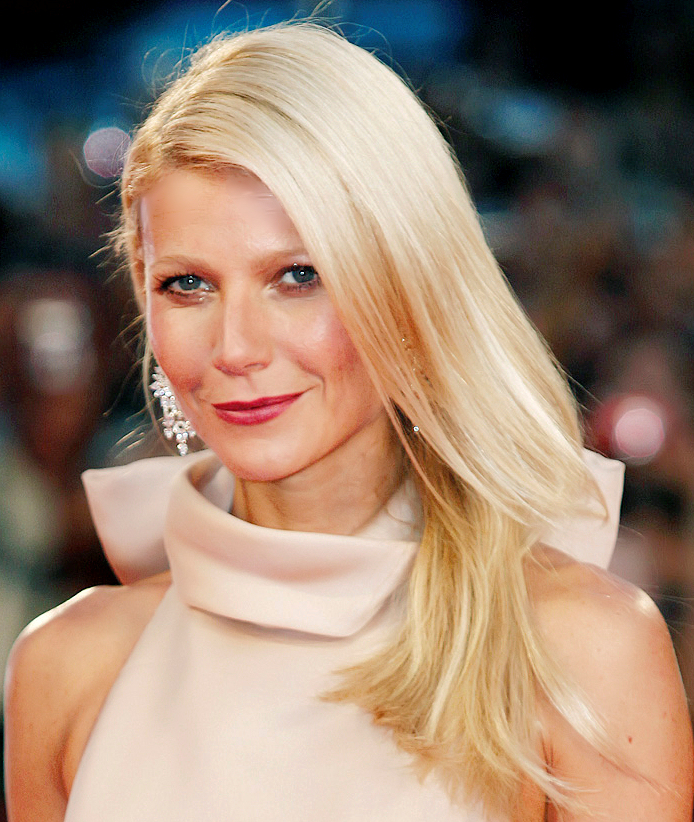
Gwyneth Paltrow

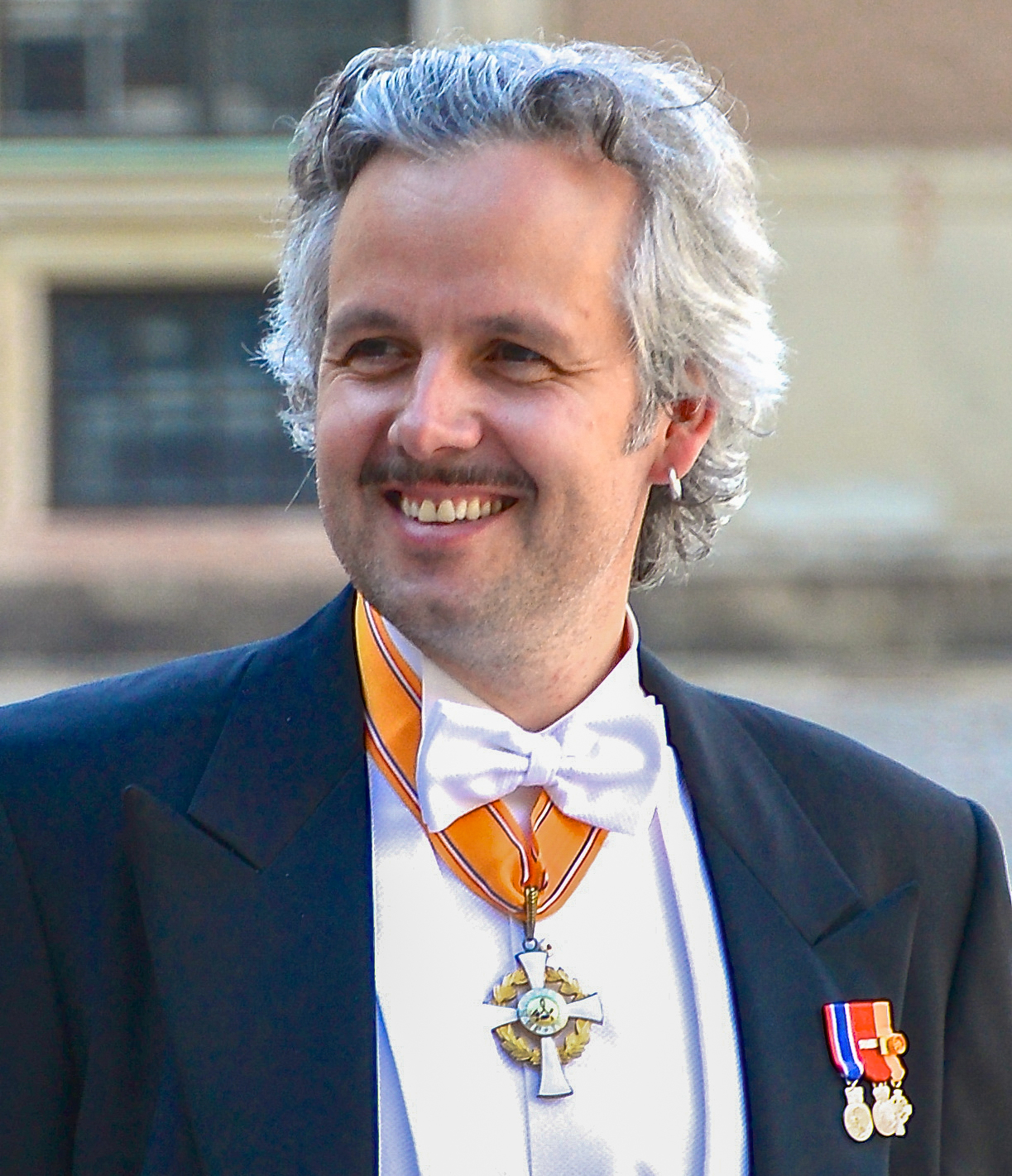
Ari Behn

- September 2 – Sergejs Žoltoks, Latvian hockey player (d. 2004)
- September 4
  - Daniel Nestor, Serbian born-Canadian tennis player
  - Françoise Yip, Chinese-Canadian actress
- September 6 – Idris Elba, English actor
- September 10 – Ghada Shouaa, Syrian athlete
- September 12 – Vebjørn Rodal, Norwegian middle-distance athlete
- September 15 – Queen Letizia of Spain
- September 16
  - Sprent Dabwido, Nauruan politician (d. 2019)
  - Vebjørn Rodal, Norwegian Olympic athlete
- September 17 – Bobby Lee, Asian-American comedian
- September 19 – Ashot Nadanian, Armenian chess player, theoretician and coach
- September 20 – Victor Ponta, 3-Time Prime Minister of Romania
- September 21
  - Liam Gallagher, British singer (Oasis)
  - Erin Fitzgerald, Canadian-American voice actress
- September 23 – Pierre Amine Gemayel, Lebanese politician (d. 2006)
- September 26 – Beto O'Rourke, American politician, representative of Texas 16th congressional district
- September 27 – Gwyneth Paltrow, American actress
- September 28 – Dita Von Teese, American burlesque artist, model and businesswoman
- September 30
  - Ari Behn, Norwegian author (d. 2019)
  - José Lima, Dominican baseball player (d. 2010)
  - Shaan, Indian singer

=== October ===
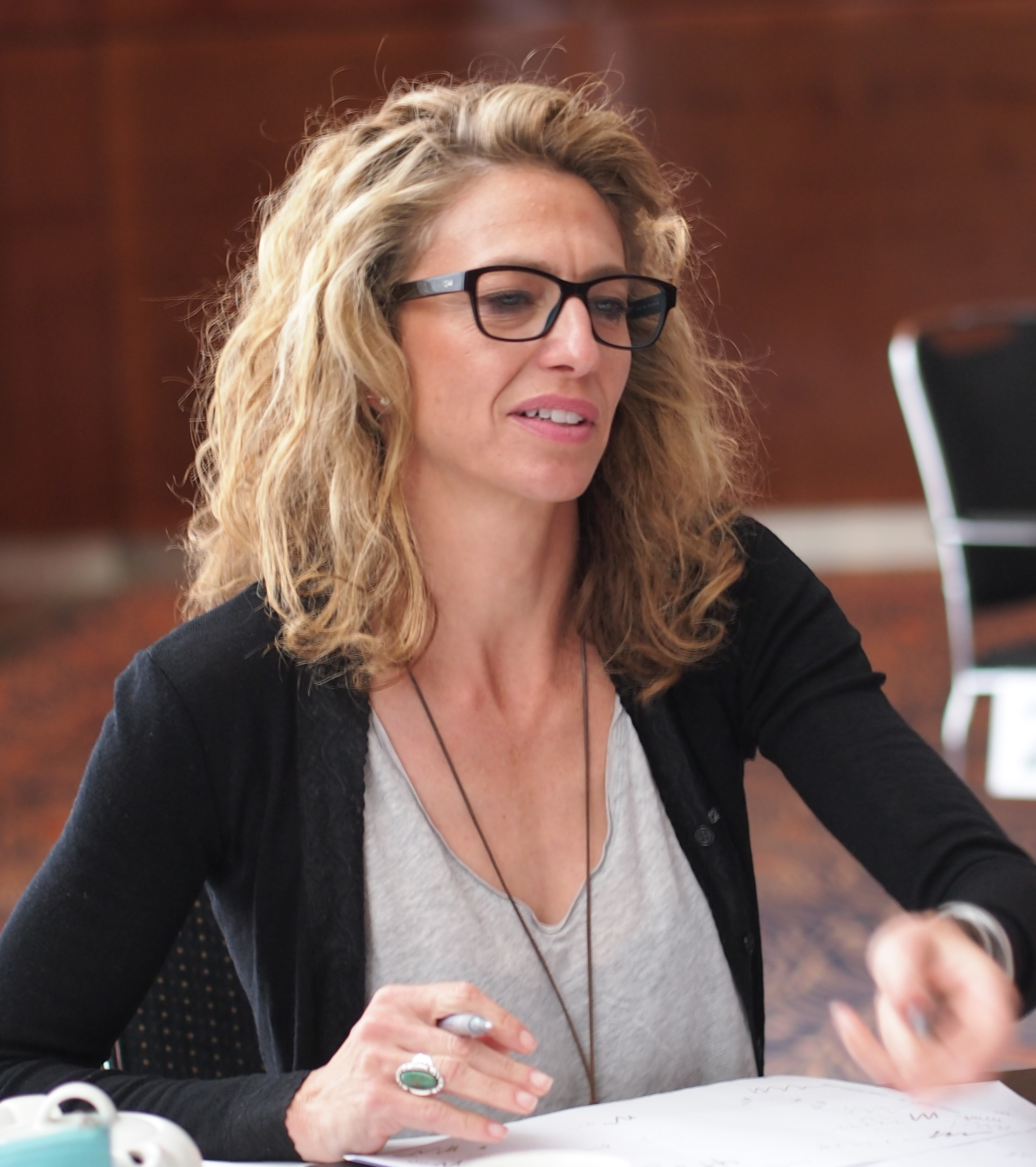
Claudia Black

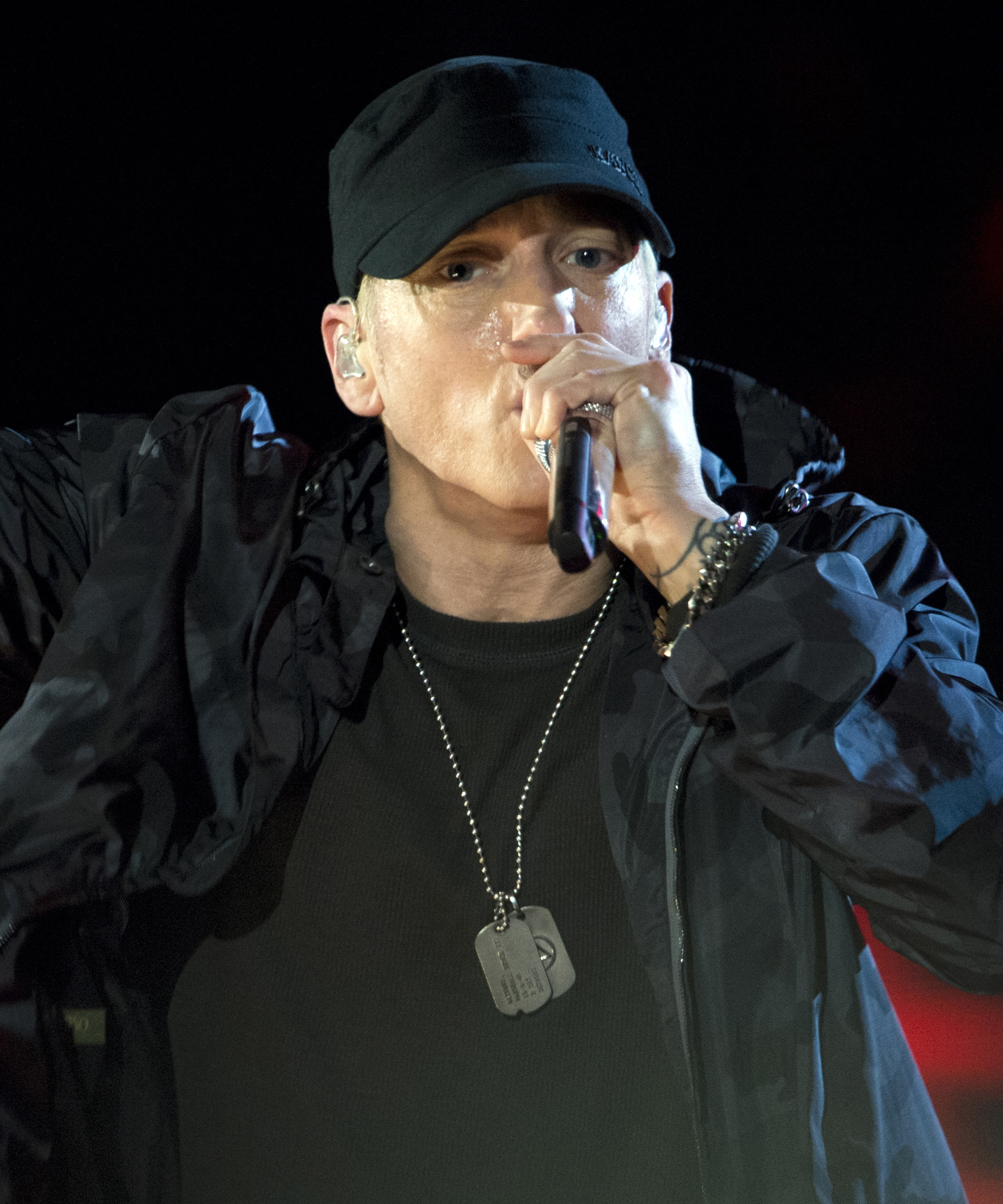
Eminem

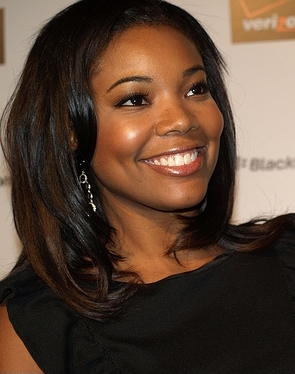
Gabrielle Union

- October 2 – Konstantinos Papadakis, Greek pianist
- October 3 – Kim Joo-hyuk, South Korean actor (d. 2017)
- October 5 – Grant Hill, African-American basketball player
- October 6 – Mark Schwarzer, Australian soccer player
- October 9 – Anabela Sousa Rodrigues, Portuguese politician and psychologist
- October 11 – Claudia Black, Australian actress
- October 15 – Sandra Kim, Belgian singer, Eurovision Song Contest 1986 winner
- October 17
  - Eminem, American rapper and actor
  - Sharon Leal, American actress and director
  - Tarkan, Turkish singer
- October 21
  - Evgeny Afineevsky, Russian-born American film director and producer
  - Evhen Tsybulenko, Ukrainian professor of international law
- October 22 – Saffron Burrows, British actress
- October 24 – Kim Ji-soo, South Korean actress
- October 25 – Esther Duflo, French American economist, recipient of the Nobel Memorial Prize in Economic Sciences
- October 26 – Dianno A. Jakelj, Slovenian abstract painter
- October 27
  - Elissa, Lebanese singer
  - Maria de Lurdes Mutola, Mozambican athlete
- October 28 – Brad Paisley, American country music singer-songwriter and guitarist.
- October 29 – Gabrielle Union, American actress

=== November ===
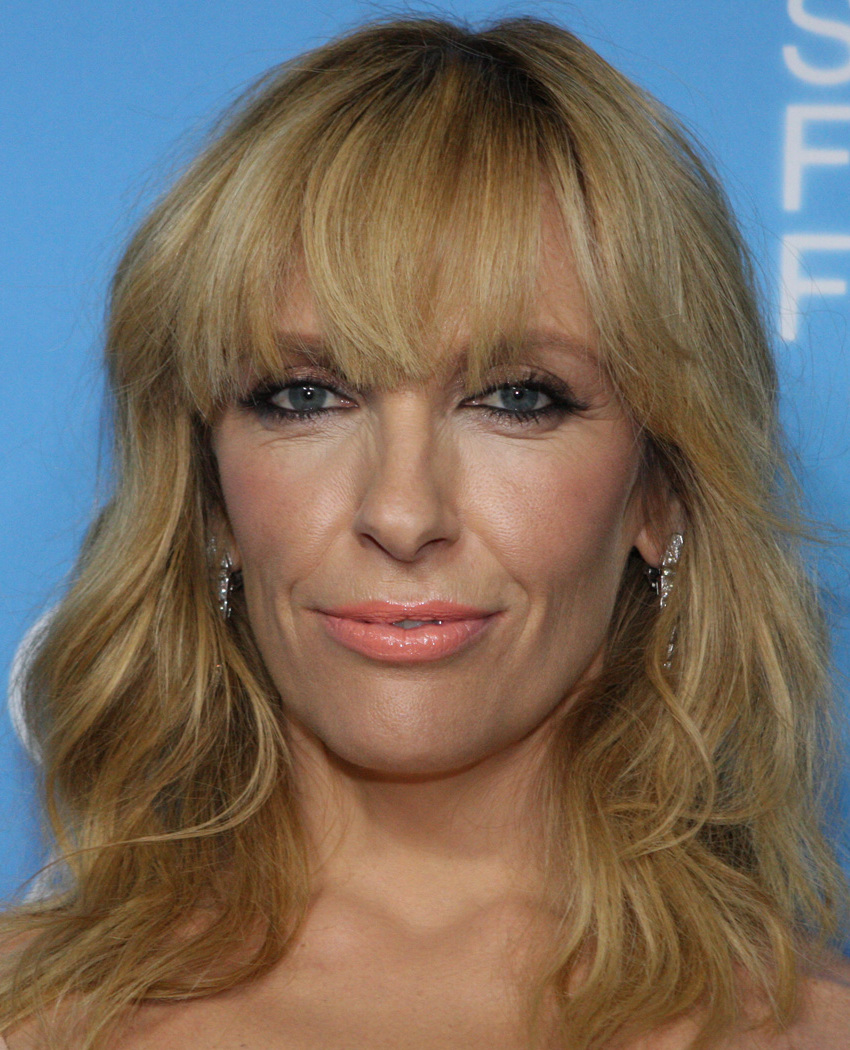
Toni Collette

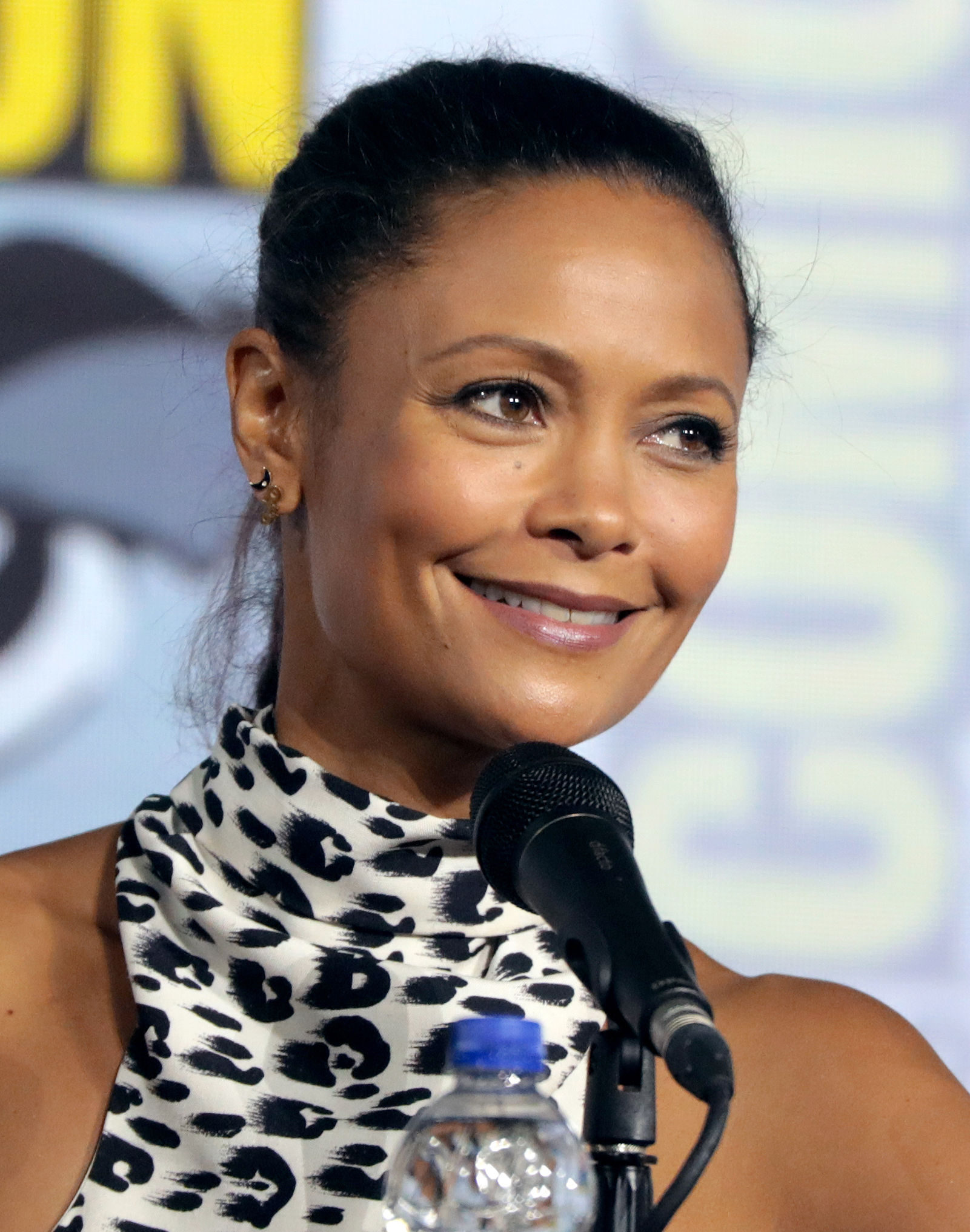
Thandiwe Newton

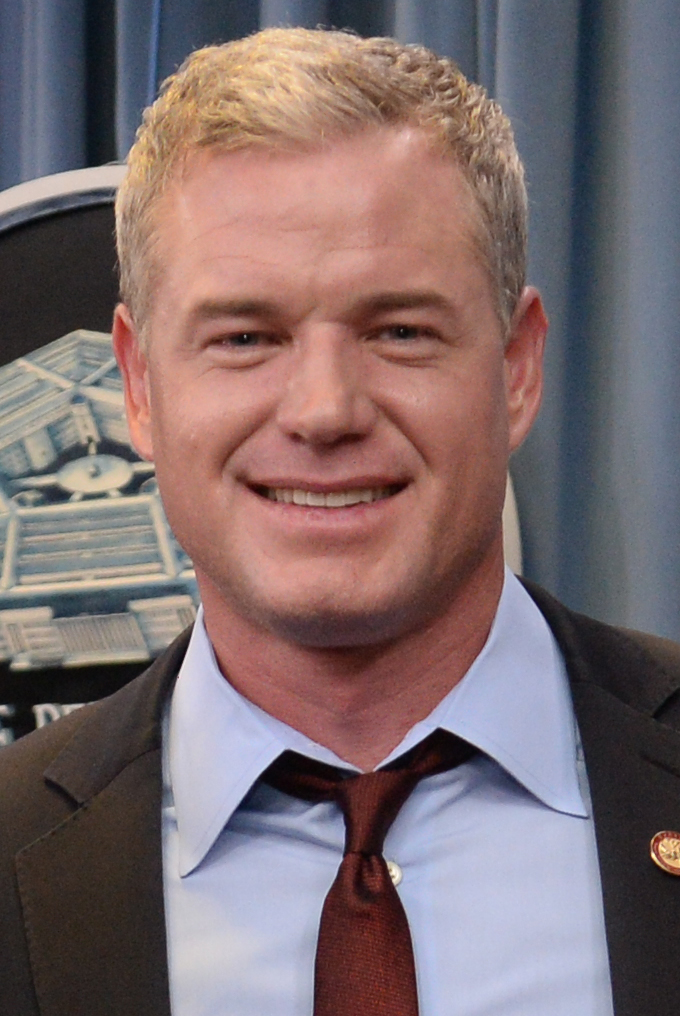
Eric Dane

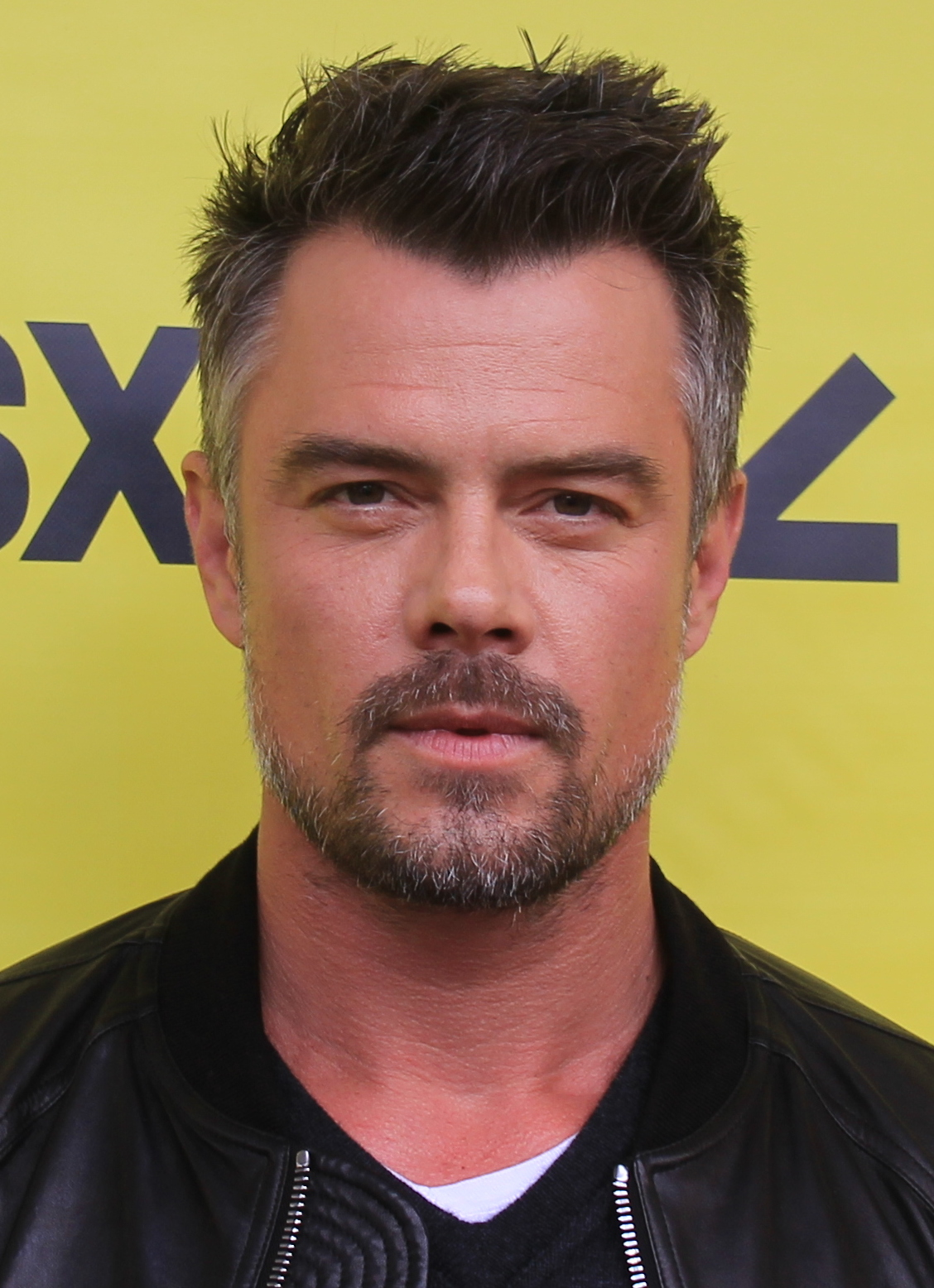
Josh Duhamel

- November 1
  - Mario Barth, German comedian
  - Toni Collette, Australian actress, singer and musician
  - Jenny McCarthy, American actress and model
- November 2 – Vladimir Vorobiev, Russian ice hockey player
- November 4 – Luís Figo, Portuguese footballer
- November 6
  - Adonis Georgiades, Greek historian and politician, Minister of Health
  - Thandiwe Newton, British actress
  - Rebecca Romijn, American actress and model
- November 8
  - Gretchen Mol, American actress
  - Maja Marijana, Serbian pop-folk singer
- November 9
  - Eric Dane, American actor (d. 2026)
  - Corin Tucker, American singer-songwriter and guitarist
- November 10
  - Trevor Devall, Canadian voice actor and podcaster
  - DJ Ashba, American musician
- November 11 – Adam Beach, Canadian actor
- November 13 – Takuya Kimura, Japanese actor
- November 14 – Josh Duhamel, American actor and model
- November 15 – Jonny Lee Miller, English-American actor
- November 16
  - Aurelia Dobre, Romanian artistic gymnast
  - Missi Pyle, American actress and singer
- November 18 – Zubeen Garg, Indian singer and actor (d. 2025)
- November 23 – Alf-Inge Haaland, Norwegian footballer
- November 26 – Arjun Rampal, Indian actor
- November 29
  - Brian Baumgartner, American actor and director
  - Andreas Goldberger, Austrian ski jumper
- November 30 – Christopher Fitzgerald, American actor

=== December ===
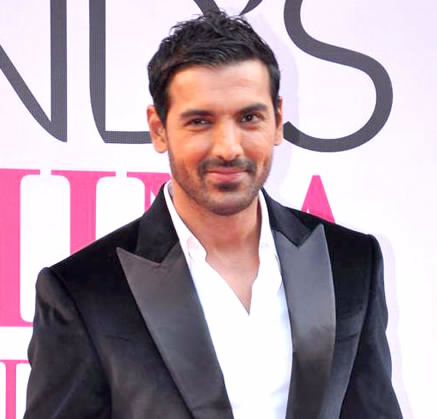
John Abraham

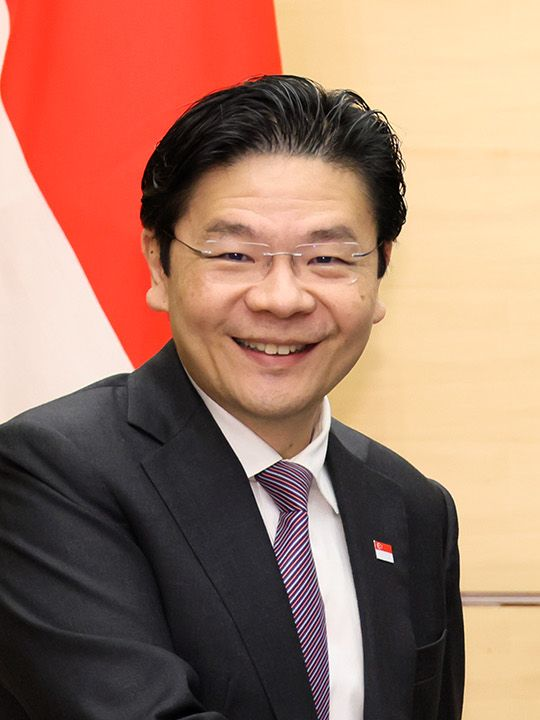
Lawrence Wong

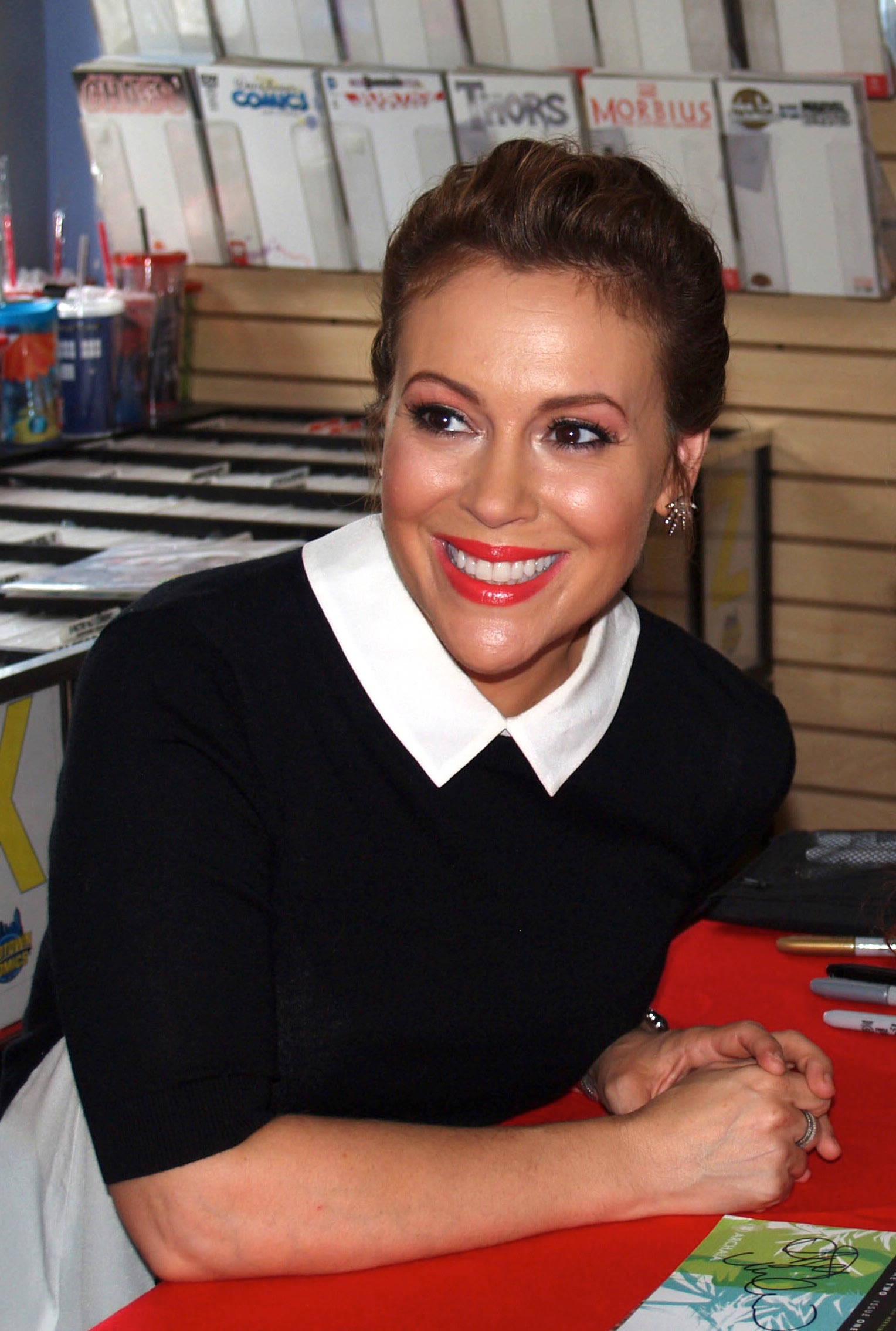
Alyssa Milano

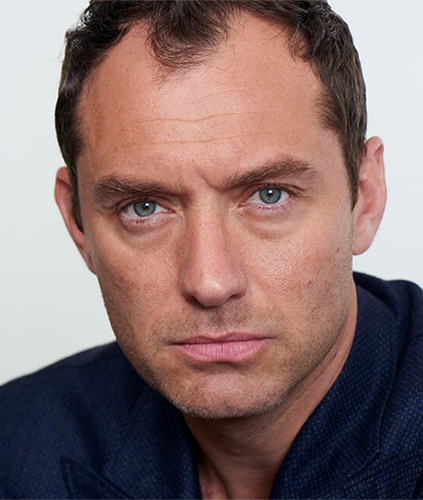
Jude Law

- December 4 – Yūko Miyamura, Japanese voice actress, actress and singer
- December 7 – Hermann Maier, Austrian skier
- December 9 – Tré Cool, American rock musician and drummer (Green Day)
- December 11 – Daniel Alfredsson, Swedish-Canadian ice hockey player
- December 12
  - Wilson Kipketer, Kenyan-Danish athlete
  - Arihito Muramatsu, Japanese baseball player
- December 13 – Mauricio Solís, Costa Rican footballer
- December 14 – Miranda Hart, British comedian and actress
- December 15 – Lee Jung-jae, South Korean actor
- December 16 – Zeljko Kalac, Australian footballer
- December 17
  - John Abraham, Indian actor
  - Iván Pedroso, Cuban long jumper
- December 18 – Lawrence Wong, Singapore economist and fourth Prime Minister of Singapore
- December 19 – Alyssa Milano, American actress
- December 22 – Vanessa Paradis, French singer and actress
- December 24 – Álvaro Mesén, Costa Rican footballer
- December 25 – Qu Yunxia, Chinese middle-distance runner
- December 27 – Colin Charvis, Welsh rugby player
- December 28 – Pat Rafter, Australian tennis player
- December 29
  - Jude Law, British actor
  - Leonor Varela, Chilean actress
- December 31 – Grégory Coupet, French footballer

== Deaths ==
=== January ===
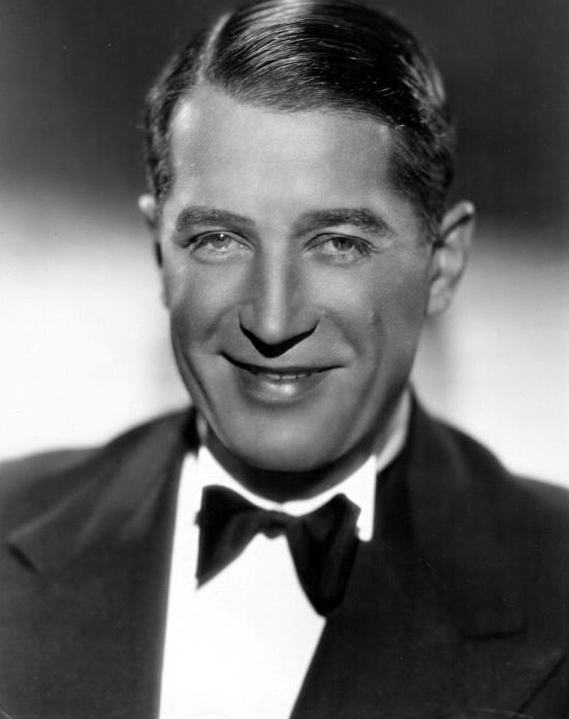
Maurice Chevalier

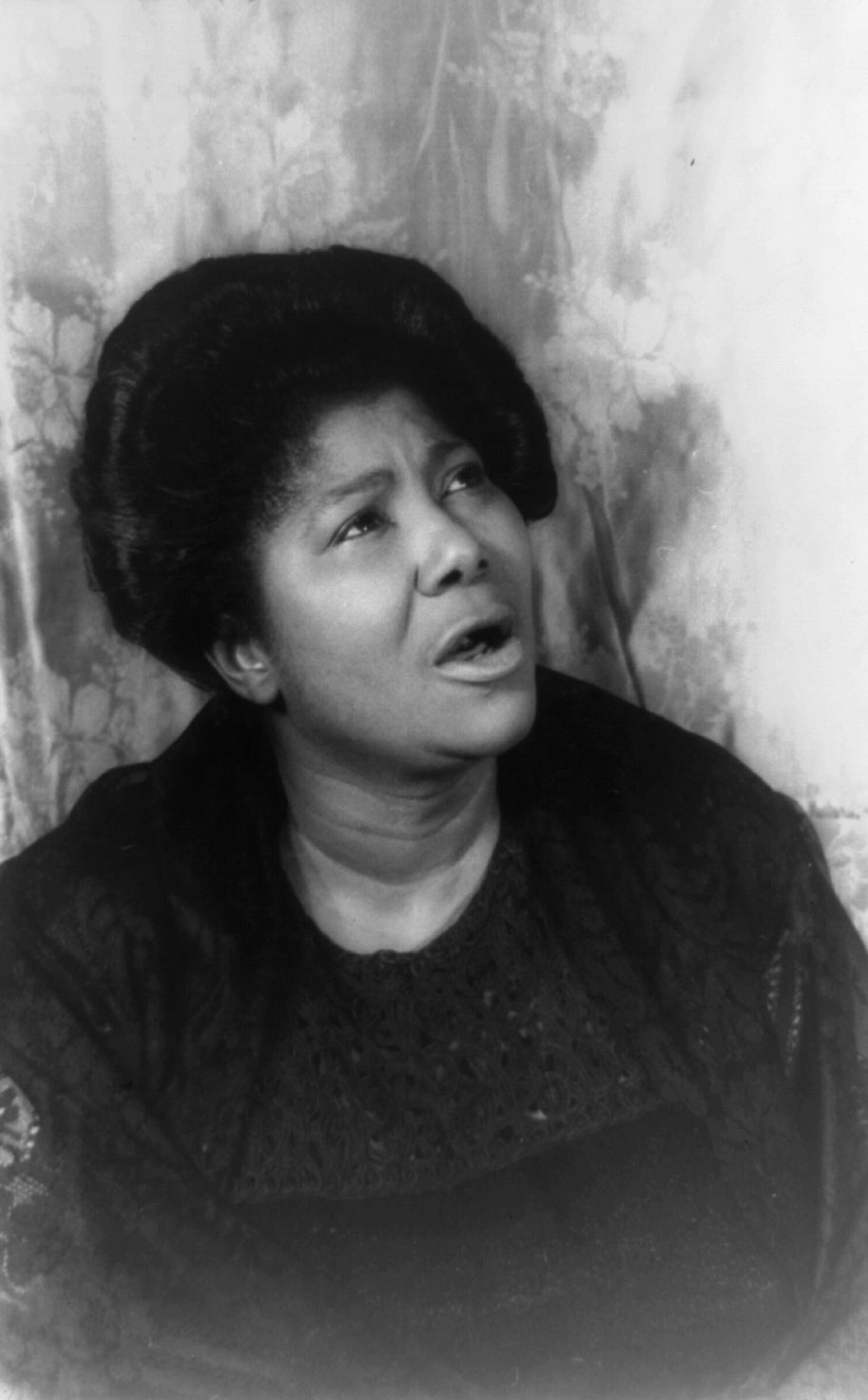
Mahalia Jackson

- January 1
  - Maurice Chevalier, French singer and actor (b. 1888)
  - Maximus V of Constantinople, Turkish Orthodox Christian bishop (b. 1897)
- January 3 – Frans Masereel, Belgian painter and graphic artist (b. 1889)
- January 6 – Chen Yi, Chinese military commander and politician (b. 1901)
- January 7
  - John Berryman, American poet (b. 1914)
  - Emma P. Carr, American spectroscopist (b. 1880)
- January 8
  - Kenneth Patchen, American poet and painter (b. 1911)
  - Wesley Ruggles, American film director (b. 1889)
- January 10
  - Nubar Gulbenkian, Ottoman-born Armenian-British oil trader, socialite and intelligence operative (b. 1896)
  - Aksel Larsen, Danish politician (b. 1897)
- January 12 – Ernest Dezentjé, Dutch-Indonesian painter (b. 1885)
- January 14 – King Frederik IX of Denmark (b. 1899)
- January 16 – Ross Bagdasarian, American record producer (b. 1919)
- January 19 – Mohammad Al-Abbasi, 45th Prime Minister of Jordan (b. 1914)
- January 25 – Erhard Milch, German field marshal and Luftwaffe officer (b. 1892)
- January 27 – Mahalia Jackson, American gospel singer (b. 1911)
- January 30
  - Beatrice Forbes, Countess of Granard, American-born heiress (b. 1883)
  - Prince Sisowath Watchayavong, 5th Prime Minister of Cambodia (b. 1891)
- January 31 – King Mahendra of Nepal (b. 1920)

=== February ===
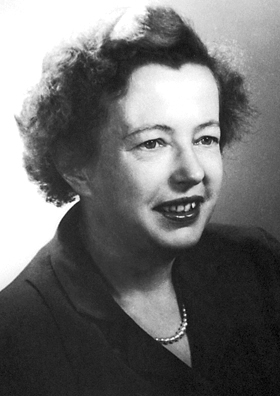
Maria Goeppert-Mayer

- February 2 – Jessie Royce Landis, American actress (b. 1896)
- February 5 – Marianne Moore, American poet (b. 1887)
- February 7 – Walter Lang, American film director (b. 1896)
- February 11 – Colin Munro MacLeod, Canadian-American geneticist (b. 1909)
- February 17 – Gavriil Popov, Soviet Russian composer (b. 1904)
- February 19
  - John Grierson, Scottish documentary filmmaker (b. 1898)
  - Lee Morgan, American jazz trumpeter and composer (b. 1938)
- February 20
  - Maria Goeppert Mayer, German physicist, Nobel Prize laureate (b. 1906)
  - Walter Winchell, American journalist (b. 1897)
- February 25 – Gottfried Fuchs, German footballer (b. 1889)

=== March ===
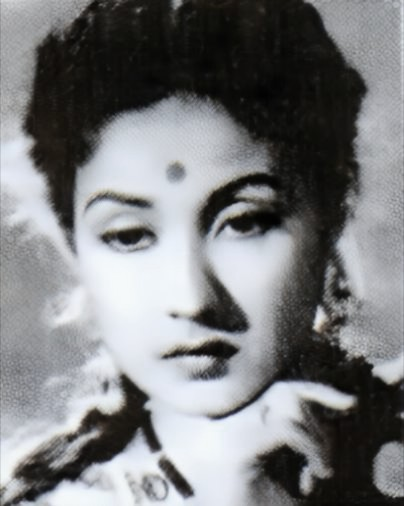
Meena Kumari

- March 8 – Erich von dem Bach-Zelewski, German Nazi politician and SS functionary (b. 1899)
- March 11
  - Fredric Brown, American science fiction and mystery writer (b. 1906)
  - Zack Wheat, American baseball player (b. 1888)
- March 20 – Marilyn Maxwell, American actress (b. 1921)
- March 23 – Cristóbal Balenciaga, Spanish couturier (b. 1895)
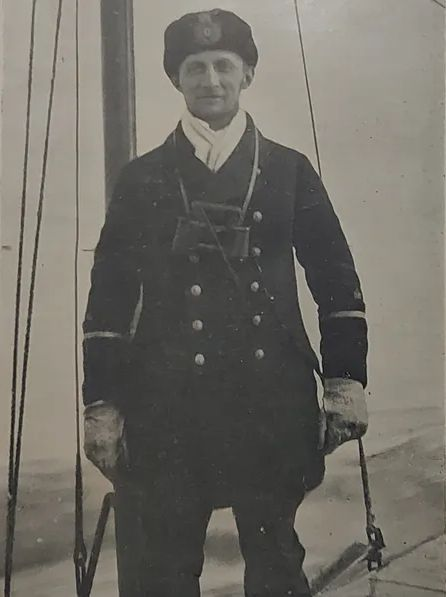
  Johannes Spiess
  March 27
  - M. C. Escher, Dutch artist (b. 1898)
  - Lorenzo Wright, American athlete (b. 1926)
- March 28 – Joseph Paul-Boncour, 71st Prime Minister of France (b. 1873)
- March 30 – Johannes Spieß, German U-boat commander during World War I (b. 1888)
- March 31 – Meena Kumari, Indian actress, singer and poet (b. 1933; cirrhosis of the liver)

=== April ===
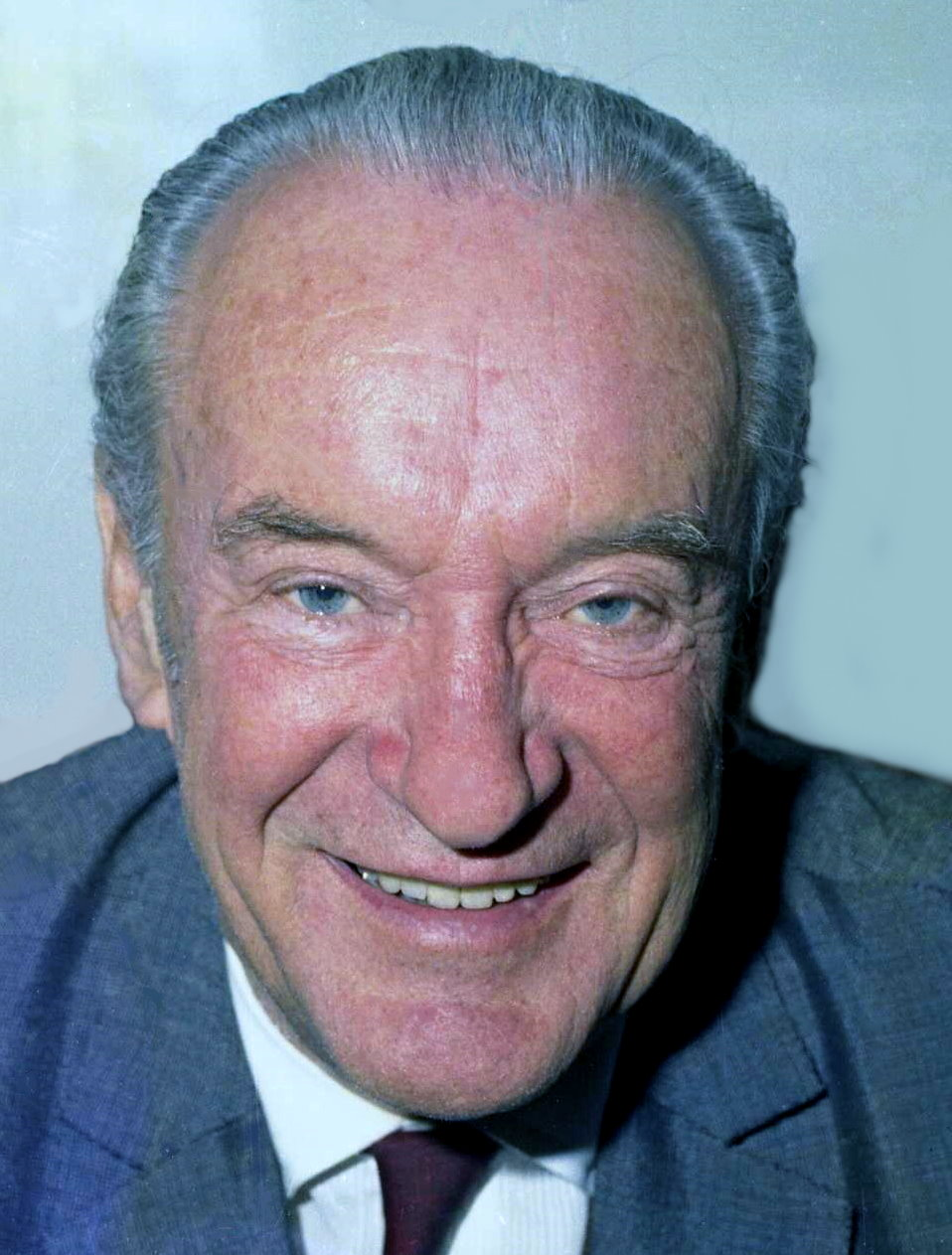
George Sanders

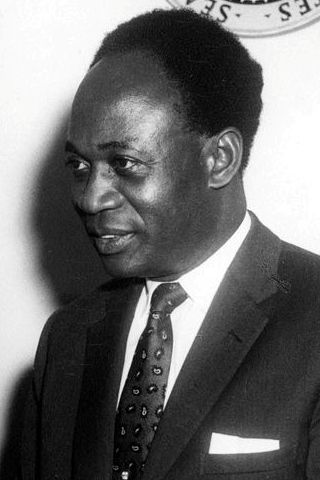
Kwame Nkrumah

- April 2 – Franz Halder, German general (b. 1884)
- April 3 – Ferde Grofé, American pianist and composer (b. 1892)
- April 4 – Stefan Wolpe, German-born American composer (b. 1902)
- April 4 – Gil Hodges, American baseball player and manager (b. 1924)
- April 5 – Isabel Jewell, American actress (b. 1907)
- April 6
  - Brian Donlevy, American actor (b. 1901)
  - Heinrich Lübke, 2nd President of the Federal Republic of Germany (b. 1894)
- April 7
  - Abeid Karume, 1st President of Zanzibar (b. 1905)
  - August Zaleski, 6th President of Poland (b. 1883)
- April 9 – James F. Byrnes, United States Secretary of State and Justice of the Supreme Court (b. 1882)
- April 10 – Henry de La Falaise, French film director, Croix de guerre recipient (b. 1898)
- April 16 – Yasunari Kawabata, Japanese novelist (b. 1899)
- April 20 – Andrea Andreen, Swedish physician (b. 1888)
- April 24
  - Fernando Amorsolo, Filipino painter (b. 1892)
  - Nora K. Chadwick, English philologist (b. 1891)
- April 25 – George Sanders, Russian-born British actor (b. 1906)
- April 27 –
  - Kwame Nkrumah, 1st President of Ghana (b. 1909)
  - Lucien Sarti, French drug trafficker shot by Mexican police.
- April 29 – King Ntare V of Burundi (b. 1947)
- April 30
  - Gia Scala, British actress (b. 1934)
  - Clara Campoamor, Spanish politician and suffragist (b. 1888)

=== May ===
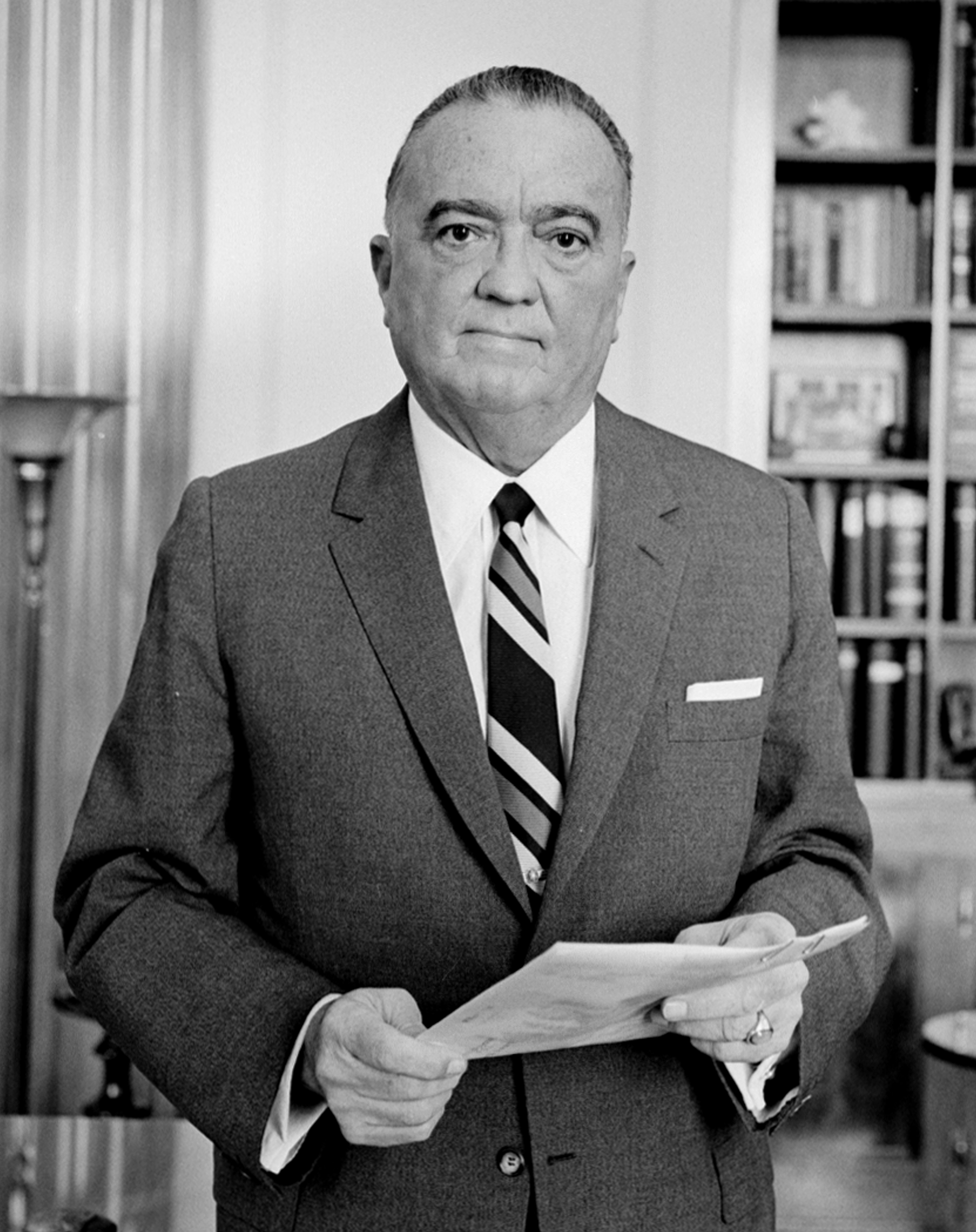
J. Edgar Hoover

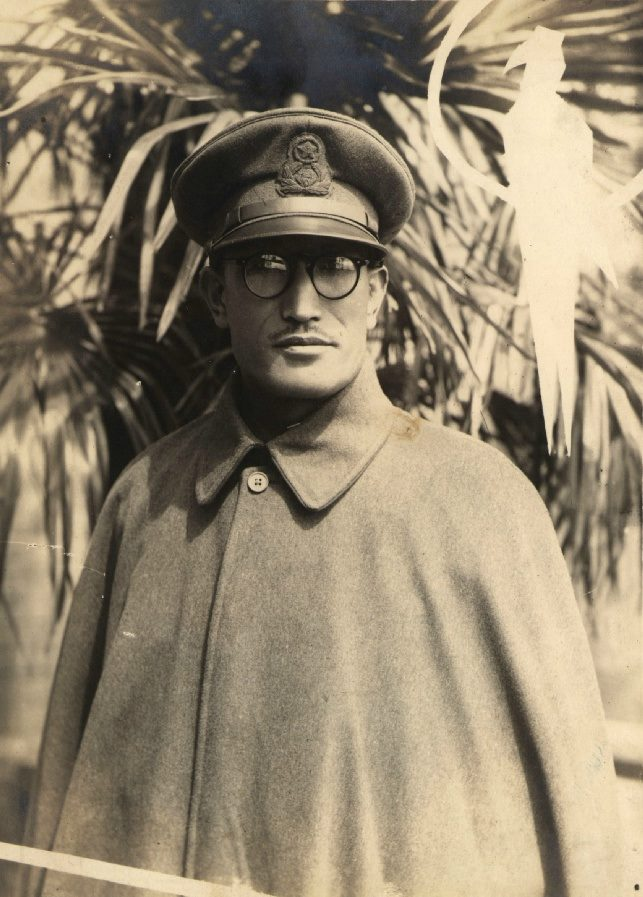
Lee Beom-seok

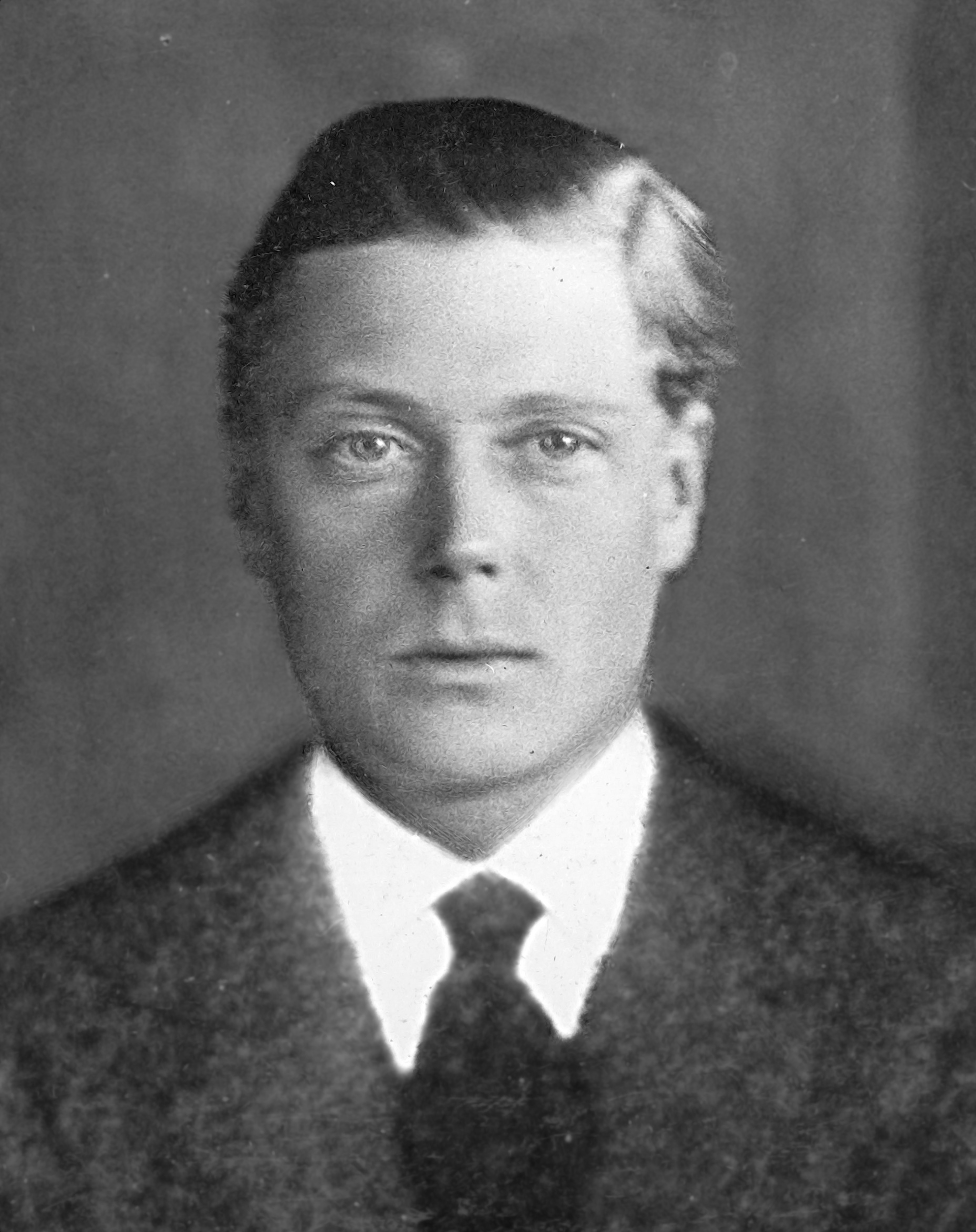
Edward VIII

- May 2 – J. Edgar Hoover, American civil servant, 1st Director of the Federal Bureau of Investigation (FBI) (b. 1895)
- May 3 – Bruce Cabot, American actor (b. 1904)
- May 4
  - Father Chrysanthus, Dutch arachnologist (b. 1905)
  - Edward Calvin Kendall, American chemist, recipient of the Nobel Prize in Physiology or Medicine (b. 1886)
  - Josep Samitier, Spanish footballer (b. 1902)
- May 5
  - Reverend Gary Davis, American blues and gospel singer (b. 1896)
  - Frank Tashlin, American animation director (b. 1913)
- May 6 – Deniz Gezmiş, Turkish Marxist revolutionary (executed) (b. 1947)
- May 10 – Rice Gemmell, Australian tennis champion (b. 1896)
- May 11 – Lee Beom-seok, Korean activist, 1st Prime Minister of South Korea (b. 1900)
- May 12 – Lionel Penrose, English geneticist (b. 1898)
- May 13 – Dan Blocker, American actor (b. 1928)
- May 15 – Nigel Green, South African-English actor (b. 1924)
- May 17 – Sir Gordon Lowe, Bt., British tennis player (b. 1884)
- May 22
  - Cecil Day-Lewis, British poet (b. 1904)
  - Dame Margaret Rutherford, English actress (b. 1892)
- May 23 – Richard Day, Canadian art director (b. 1896)
- May 24
  - Asta Nielsen, Danish silent film star (b. 1881)
  - Ismail Yassine, Egyptian comedian and actor (b. 1912)
- May 28
  - The Duke of Windsor, previously King Edward VIII of the United Kingdom (b. 1894)
  - Violette Leduc, French writer (b. 1907)
- May 29 – Prithviraj Kapoor, Indian actor and director (b. 1906)
- May 30 – Watchman Nee, Chinese Christian preacher and church leader (b. 1903)
- May 31 – Walter Jackson Freeman II, American neurologist (b. 1895)

=== June ===
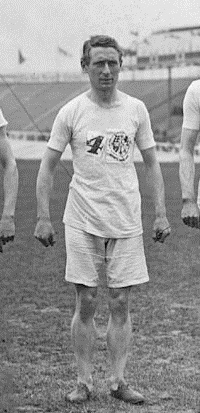
Joe Deakin

- June 9 – Rudolf Belling, German sculptor (b. 1886)
- June 12
  - Saul Alinsky, American political activist (b. 1909)
  - Ludwig von Bertalanffy, Austrian biologist (b. 1901)
  - Edmund Wilson, American writer and critic (b. 1895)
- June 13
  - Georg von Békésy, Hungarian biophysicist, recipient of the Nobel Prize in Physiology or Medicine (b. 1899)
  - Stephanie von Hohenlohe, Austrian-born German World War II spy (b. 1891)
  - Clyde McPhatter, American singer (b. 1932)
  - Felix Stump, American admiral (b. 1894)
- June 18 – Milton L. Humason, American astronomer (b. 1891)
- June 20 – Henriette Roosenburg, Dutch journalist (b. 1916)
- June 22 – Vladimir Durković, Serbian footballer (b. 1937)
- June 25 – Jan Matulka, Czech-born American artist (b. 1890)
- June 28 – Prasanta Chandra Mahalanobis, Indian scientist (b. 1893)
- June 30 – Joe Deakin, British Olympic athlete (b. 1879)

=== July ===
- July 2 – Joseph Fielding Smith, 10th president of the Church of Jesus Christ of Latter-day Saints (b. 1876)
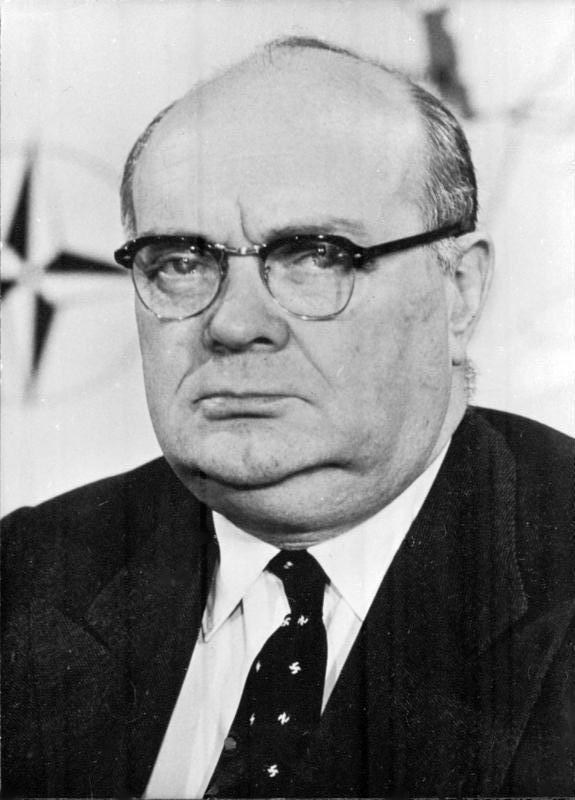
- Paul-Henri Spaak
  July 5 – Raúl Leoni, 55th President of Venezuela (b. 1905)
- July 6 – Brandon deWilde, American actor (b. 1942)
- July 7
  - Patriarch Athenagoras I of Constantinople (b. 1886)
  - King Talal of Jordan (b. 1909)
- July 8 – Ghassan Kanafani, Palestinian author (b. 1936)
- July 20 – Geeta Dutt, Indian singer (b. 1930)
- July 21
  - Ralph Craig, American Olympic athlete (b. 1889)
  - King Jigme Dorji Wangchuck (b. 1929)
- July 24 − Lance Reventlow, English playboy, entrepreneur and racing driver (b. 1936)
- July 25 − Oscar Elton Sette, American fisheries scientist (b. 1900)
- July 27 – Count Richard von Coudenhove-Kalergi, Austrian-Japanese politician and philosopher (b. 1894)
- July 28 – Helen Traubel, American soprano (b. 1899)
- July 31
  - Alfons Gorbach, Austrian politician, 15th Chancellor of Austria (b. 1898)
  - Paul-Henri Spaak, Belgian politician and statesman, 31st Prime Minister of Belgium and 2nd Secretary General of NATO (b. 1899)

=== August ===
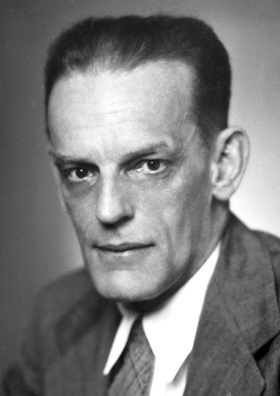
Max Theiler

- August 2 – Paul Goodman, American author (b. 1911)
- August 8 – Andrea Feldman, American actress (b. 1948)
- August 9 – Ernst von Salomon, German writer (b. 1902)
- August 11 – Max Theiler, South African-born American virologist, recipient of the Nobel Prize in Physiology or Medicine (b. 1899)
- August 14
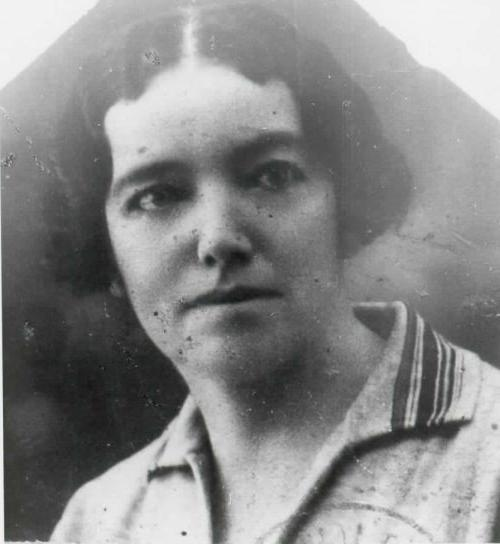
  - Pavla Hočevar
    Oscar Levant, American pianist and actor (b. 1906)
  - Jules Romains, French poet and writer (b. 1885)
- August 16 – Pierre Brasseur, French actor (b. 1905)
- August 18 – Pavla Hočevar, Slovenian teacher, writer, socialist and suffragist (b. 1889)
- August 20 – Juan Manuel Gálvez, 39th President of Honduras (b. 1887)
- August 24 – Jinichi Kusaka, Japanese admiral (b. 1888)
- August 26 – Sir Francis Chichester, British sailor and aviator (b. 1901)
- August 28 – Prince William of Gloucester (b. 1941)
- August 29
  - Lale Andersen, German singer (b. 1905)
  - René Leibowitz, French composer (b. 1913)

=== September ===
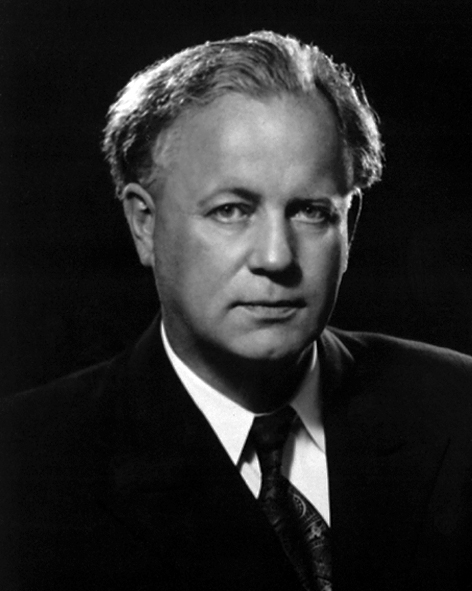
Ásgeir Ásgeirsson

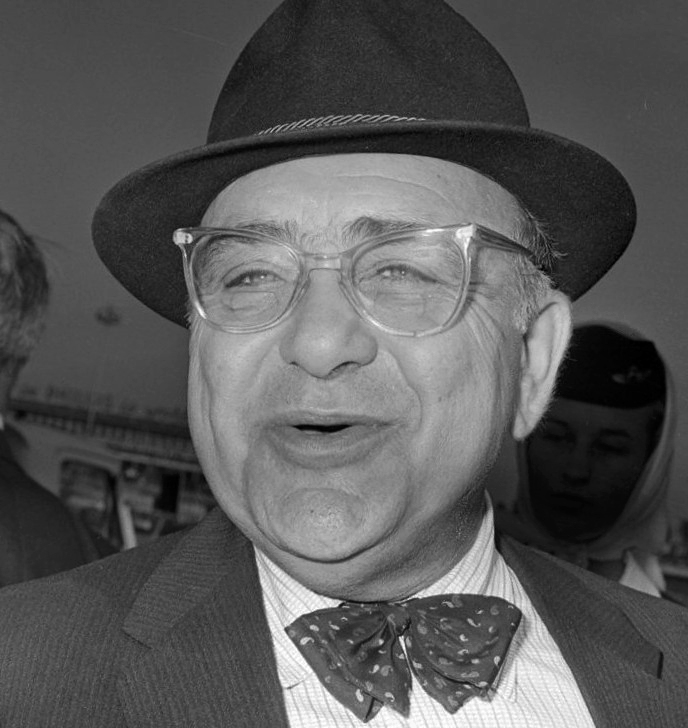
Akim Tamiroff

- September 1 – He Xiangning, Chinese revolutionary, feminist, politician, painter and poet (b. 1878)
- September 2 – Ivan Yumashev, Soviet admiral (b. 1895)
- September 5 (Munich massacre):
  - Yossef Romano, Israeli weightlifter (b. 1940)
  - Moshe Weinberg, Israeli wrestling coach (b. 1939)
- September 6 (Munich massacre):
  - David Berger, Israeli weightlifter (b. 1944)
  - Ze'ev Friedman, Israeli weightlifter (b. 1944)
  - Yossef Gutfreund, Israeli wrestling referee (b. 1931)
  - Eliezer Halfin, Israeli wrestler (b. 1948)
  - Amitzur Shapira, Israeli athletics coach (b. 1932)
  - Kehat Shorr, Israeli shooting coach (b. 1919)
  - Mark Slavin, Israeli wrestler (b. 1954)
  - Andre Spitzer, Israeli fencing coach (b. 1945)
- September 8 – Warren Kealoha, American Olympic swimmer (b. 1903)
- September 12 – William Boyd, American actor (b. 1895)
- September 13 – Zoel Parenteau, American composer (b. 1883)
- September 15
  - Ásgeir Ásgeirsson, 2nd President of Iceland (b. 1894)
  - Geoffrey Fisher, Archbishop of Canterbury (b. 1887)
- September 17 – Akim Tamiroff, Armenian actor (b. 1899)
- September 19 – Robert Casadesus, French pianist (b. 1899)
- September 21 – Henry de Montherlant, French writer (b. 1896)
- September 25 – Max Fleischer, American animator (b. 1883)

=== October ===
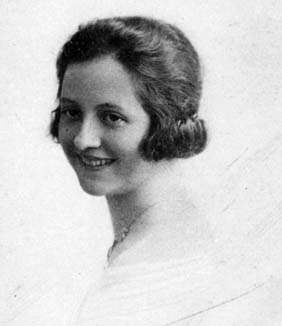
Marie-Louise Dubreil-Jacotin

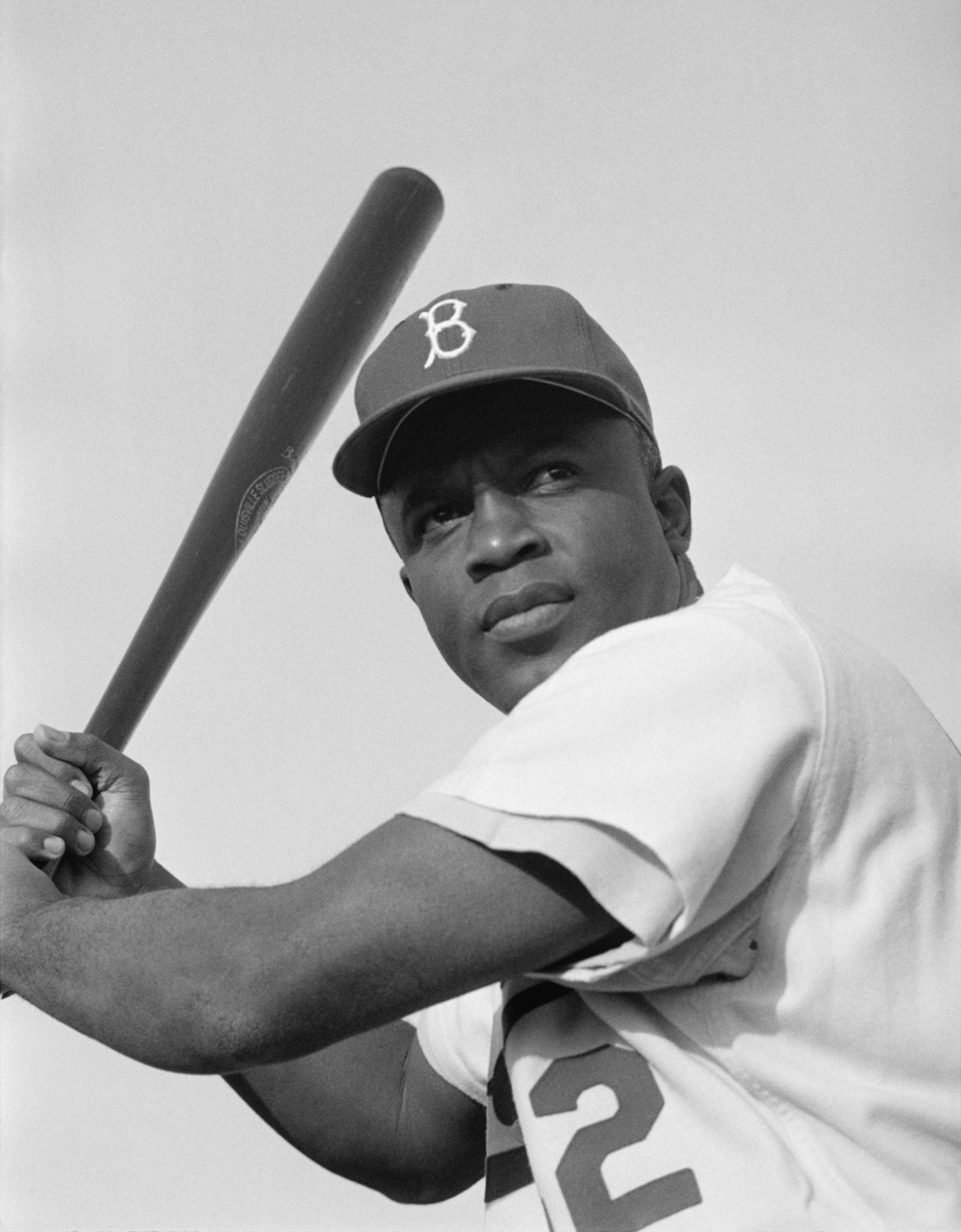
Jackie Robinson

- October 1 – Louis Leakey, British paleontologist (b. 1903)
- October 5 – Ivan Yefremov, Soviet paleontologist and science fiction author (b. 1908)
- October 8 – Prescott Bush, American banker and politician (b. 1895)
- October 9 – Miriam Hopkins, American actress (b. 1902)
- October 10 – Kenneth Edgeworth, Irish army officer, economist and astronomer (b. 1880)
- October 16 – Leo G. Carroll, English actor (b. 1886)
- October 17 – George, Crown Prince of Serbia (b. 1887)
- October 19 - Marie-Louise Dubreil-Jacotin, French mathematician (b. 1905)
- October 20 – Harlow Shapley, American astronomer (b. 1885)
- October 24
  - Jackie Robinson, African-American baseball player (b. 1919)
  - Claire Windsor, American actress (b. 1892)
- October 26 – Igor Sikorsky, Soviet aviation engineer (b. 1889)
- October 27 – Katherine Oppenheimer, American biologist (b. 1910)
- October 28 – Mitchell Leisen, American film director (b. 1898)

=== November ===
- November 1 – Ezra Pound, American poet (b. 1885)
- November 5 – Reginald Owen, English actor (b. 1887)
- November 12
  - Rudolf Friml, Czech composer (b. 1879)
  - José Nucete Sardi, Venezuelan historian and diplomat (b. 1897)
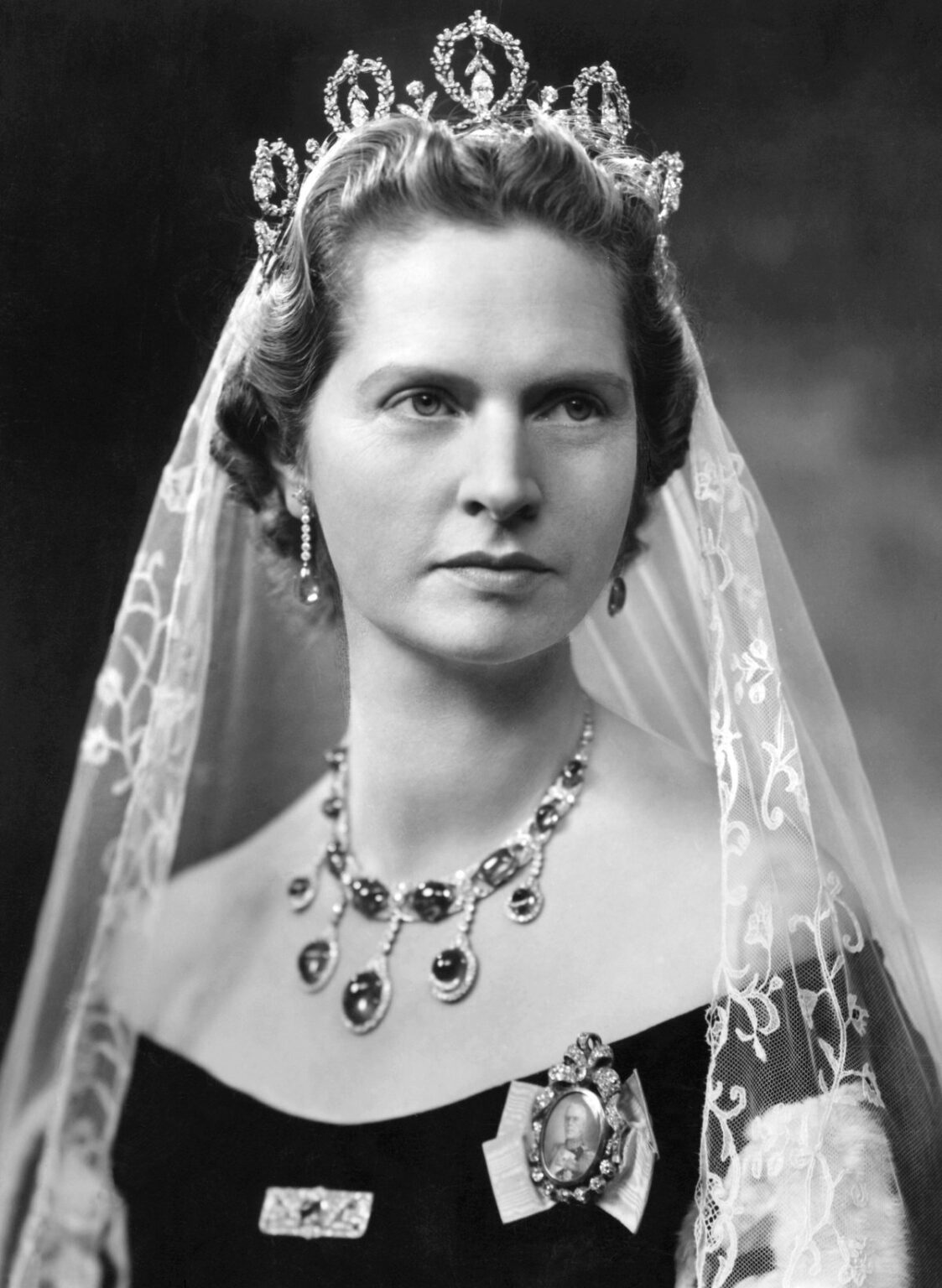
    Princess Sibylla of Saxe-Coburg and Gotha
- November 13 – Arnold Jackson, British Olympic athlete (b. 1891)
- November 14 – Martin Dies Jr., American politician (b. 1900)
- November 17
  - Thomas C. Kinkaid, American admiral (b. 1888)
  - Eugène Minkowski, French psychiatrist (b. 1885)
- November 20 – Ennio Flaiano, Italian screenwriter, playwright, novelist, journalist and drama critic (b. 1910)
- November 23 – Marie Wilson, American actress (b. 1916)
- November 25 – Henri Coandă, Romanian aerodynamics pioneer (b. 1886)
- November 28
  - Havergal Brian, English composer (b. 1876)
  - Princess Sibylla of Saxe-Coburg and Gotha (b. 1908)
- November 29 – Carl W. Stalling, American musician (b. 1891)

=== December ===
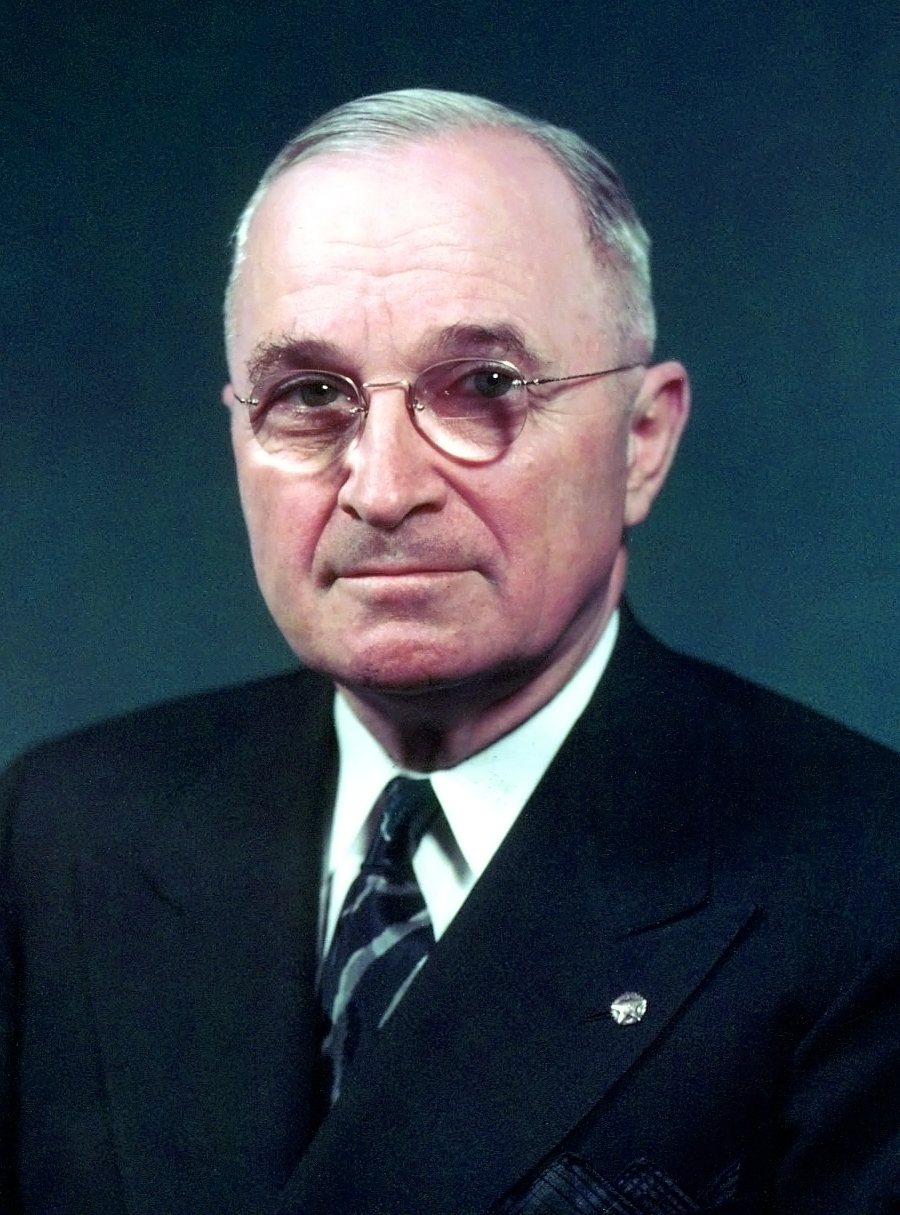
Harry S. Truman

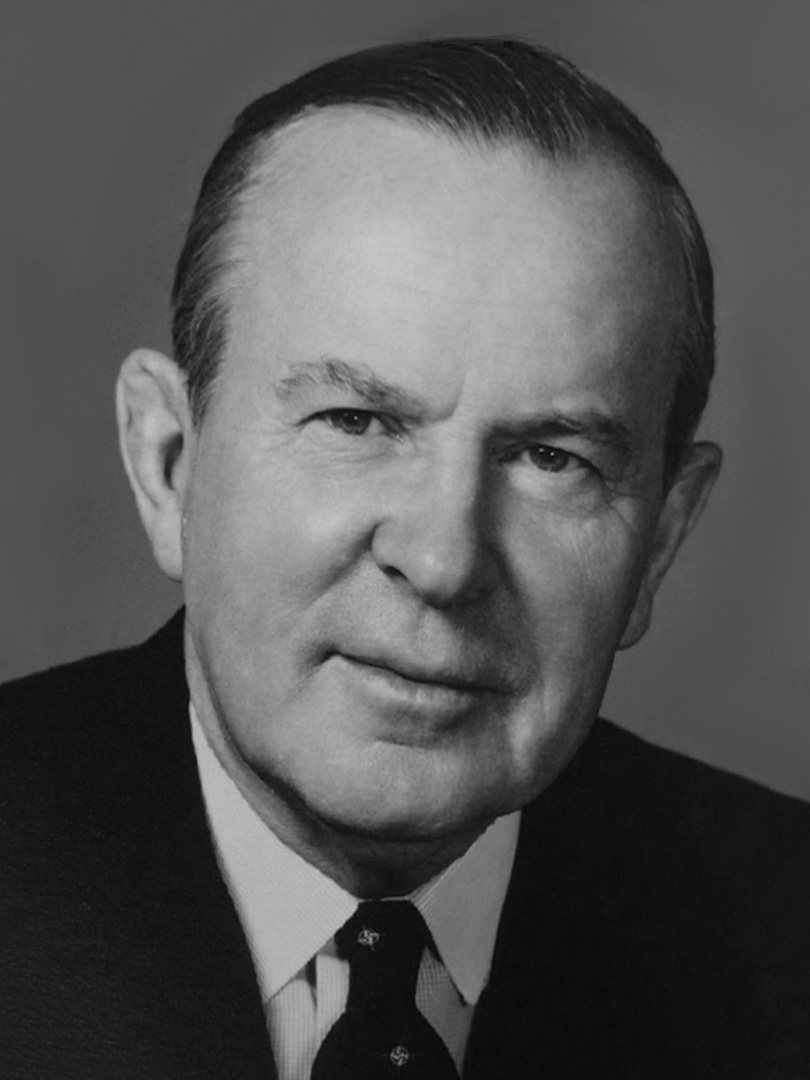
Lester B. Pearson

- December 1 – Antonio Segni, 34th Prime Minister of Italy and 4th President of the Italian Republic (b. 1891)
- December 2 – Ettore Bastico, Italian field marshal (b. 1876)
- December 9
  - William Dieterle, German film director (b. 1893)
  - Louella Parsons, American gossip columnist (b. 1881)
- December 11 – Numa Turcatti, Uruguayan law student, victim of the Uruguayan Air Force Flight 571 crash (b. 1947)
- December 12 – Thomas H. Robbins Jr., American admiral (b. 1900)
- December 13 – René Mayer, 91st Prime Minister of France (b. 1895)
- December 20 – Günter Eich, German lyricist, dramatist and author (b. 1907)
- December 21
  - Horace Mann Bond, American historian and college administrator (b. 1904)
  - Paul Hausser, German Waffen SS general and commander (b. 1880)
- December 23 – Andrei Tupolev, Soviet aircraft designer (b. 1888)
- December 24
  - Charles Atlas, Italian-born American strongman and sideshow performer (b. 1892)
  - Gisela Richter, English art historian (b. 1882)
- December 25 – C. Rajagopalachari, Indian politician and freedom-fighter. Last Governor-General of India (1948–50) (b. 1878)
- December 26 – Harry S. Truman, 33rd President of the United States (b. 1884)
- December 27 – Lester B. Pearson, 14th Prime Minister of Canada, recipient of the Nobel Peace Prize (b. 1897)
- December 29 – Joseph Cornell, American sculptor (b. 1903)
- December 31 – Roberto Clemente, Puerto Rican baseball player (b. 1934)

== Nobel Prizes ==

- Physics – John Bardeen, Leon Neil Cooper, John Robert Schrieffer
- Chemistry – Christian B. Anfinsen, Stanford Moore, William H. Stein
- Physiology or Medicine – Gerald M. Edelman, Rodney R. Porter
- Literature – Heinrich Böll
- Peace – not awarded
- Economics – John Hicks, Kenneth Arrow

== Other academic awards ==
- Turing Award – Edsger W. Dijkstra
