= Dianno A. Jakelj =

Dianno A. Jakelj, (born 26 October 1972, in Ljubljana, Slovenia) is an abstract painter.

In 1997, his then three-year-old eldest daughter suffered neurological damage following a rabies vaccination after she had been bitten by an unidentified mammal while on vacation. Jakelj and his family entered a protracted lawsuit against the state. Jakelj indicates that he began painting after her injury due to her love of art.

In 2001, he founded the charitable foundation "4 Help 2 Children", which he supports with a portion of the proceeds from his painting. In 2013 he had four exhibitions in two months:

- Slovenian National Gallery in Ljubljana ( March 2013)
- Špas Theatre Mengeš Slovenia ( April 2013)
- Monaco, Grimaldi Forum, the Art Monaco ( April 2013)
- Barranquilla, Colombia, Barranquillaart ( April, May 2013)

His artworks have been privately auctioned by Christie's Auction Company in Monaco and Barranquillarte.
