= Monument to Ivan Cankar (Vrhnika) =

- Spomenik Ivanu Cankarju
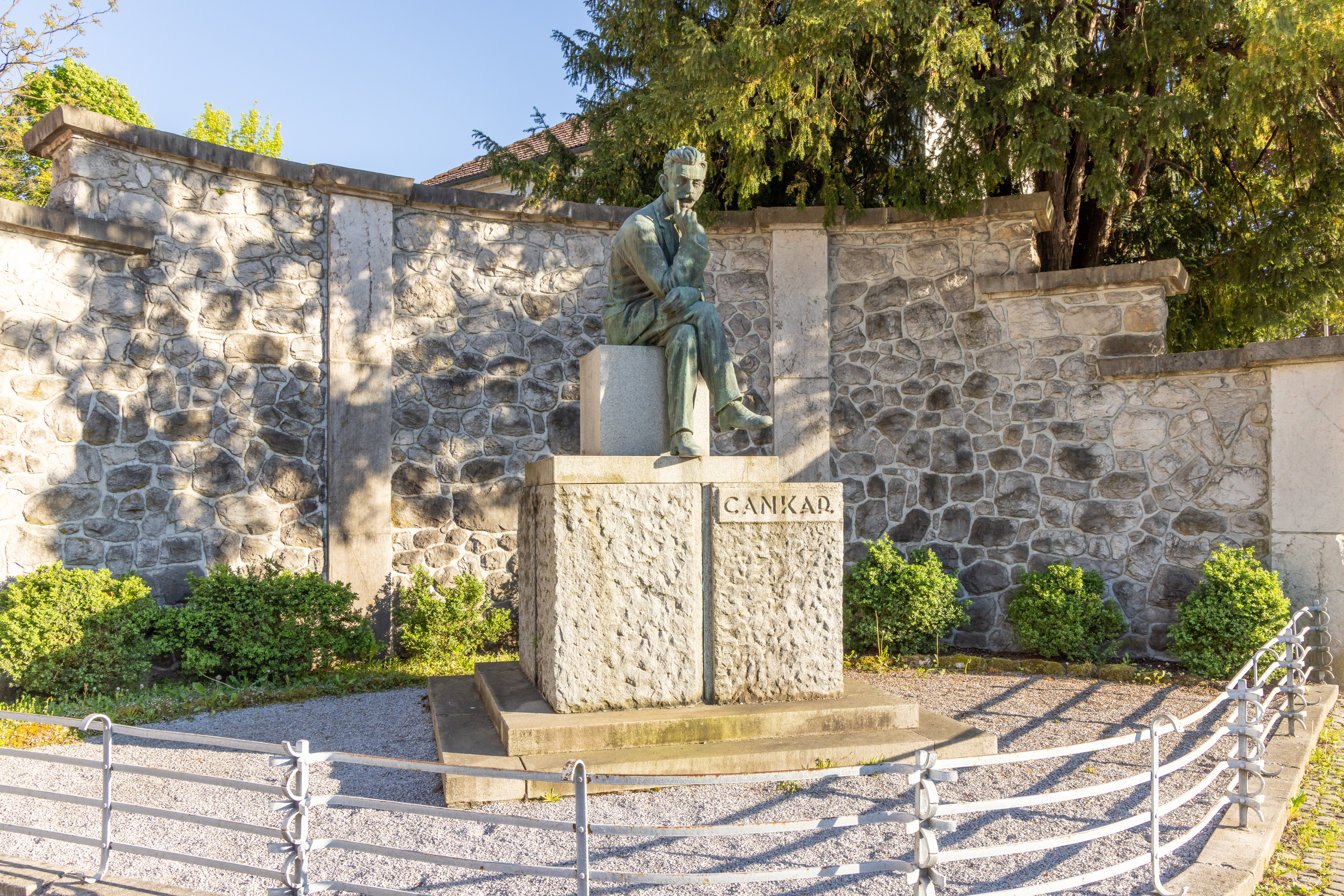
- Interactive map of Monument to Ivan Cankar
- Location: Cankar Square, Vrhnika
- Coordinates: 45.966292°N 14.298623°E
- Designer: Ivan Jurkovič
- Material: bronze
- Opening date: 10 August 1930
- Dedicated to: Ivan Cankar

The monument to Ivan Cankar (Slovene: spomenik Ivanu Cankarju) is a public monument located on the Cankar Square in Vrhnika town center, Slovenia, at the intersection of Tržaška street and the road leading south to Verd. It consists of a bronze full-body statue in a contemplative pose, depicting the writer Ivan Cankar sitting with legs crossed and one hand supporting the chin. The statue sits on simple stone blocks with the inscription "CANKAR", surrounded by a stone wall behind and a low metal fence in front. It was designed by the sculptor Ivan Jurkovič and built in 1930.

== History ==
=== Background ===
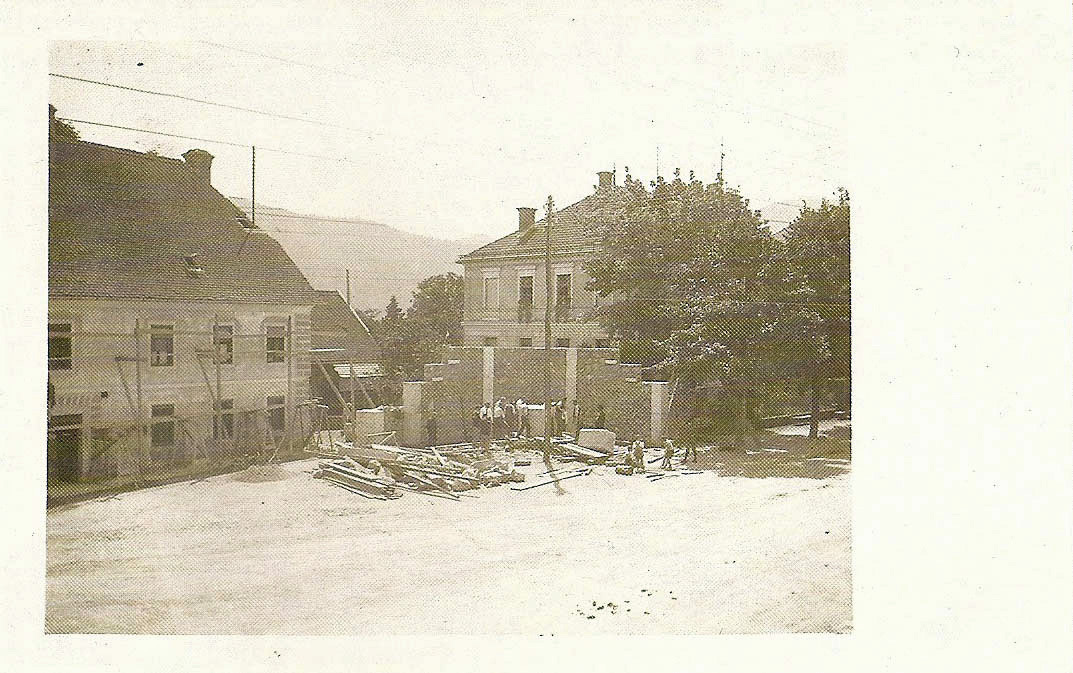
The monument during construction (1930)

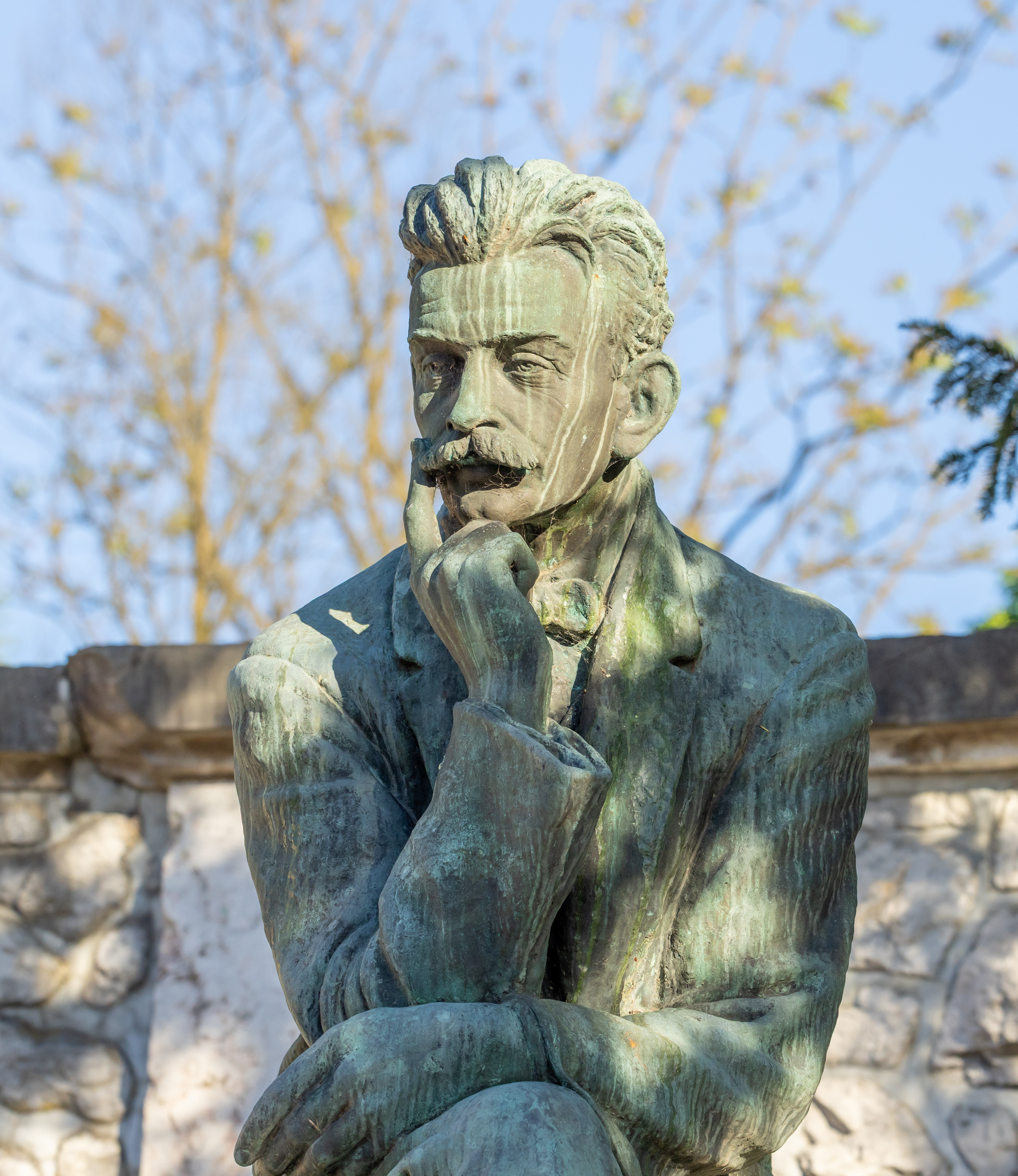
Closeup of the statue

Ivan Cankar was already widely regarded as one of the greatest Slovene writers by the time of his death in 1918. The following year, a committee was tasked to find a way to properly commemorate him. After a long period of arguing, both within the committee and in newspapers, the current location for a monument was selected. Slovene diaspora in Detroit actively participated in fundraising, a committee was founded there as well to oversee it.

For the statue itself, the main committee organized a competition, to which 21 drafts by ten authors were submitted. They were displayed on 24 November 1929 in the neighboring building of the agricultural loan office. The committee selected Jurkovič's "Thinker", which they supported by stating that the locals thought it most closely resembled Cankar's real image. However, the expert sub-committee selected the statue "Traveller" by Lojze Dolinar instead and proposed a slightly different location – in front of the Black Eagle inn on the opposite side of the square, where a reading room used to stand. An argument broke out, intense and public enough to reach the American diaspora which was therefore reluctant to send the collected funds. Nevertheless, the decision of the main committee was implemented without change at the end.

=== Unveiling ===
The committee could then start organizing the unveiling ceremony. The date was set in the middle of the summer so that emigrants could also attend, and a sizeable number of Slovene Americans did in fact visit the homeland for this purpose.

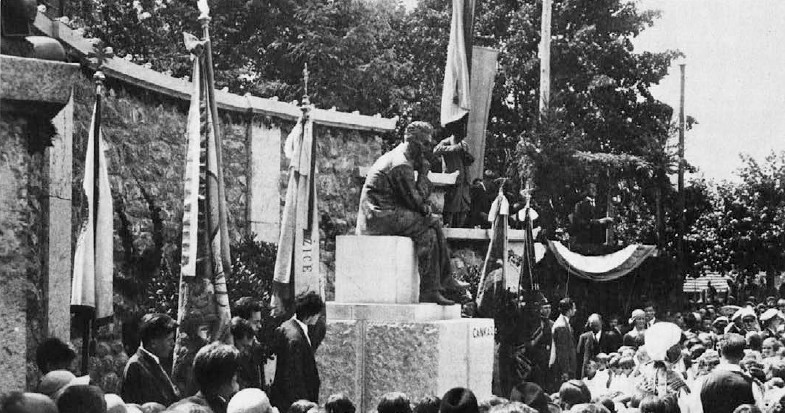
The unveiling ceremony on 10 August 1930

The ceremonies began on Saturday, 9 August 1930, with a concert of the Vrhnika brass band, lighting of torches and a celebratory academy in the nearby Craft Hall. The next morning, a throng of onlookers arrived from near and far, including by train from Ljubljana. The ceremonial procession went from the Vrhnika train station to the Holy Trinity Church where the writer's brother Karlo celebrated a Mass, having arrived from Sarajevo for the occasion. The ceremony then continued with the unveiling of a plaque on Cankar's memorial house, followed the same morning by the unveiling of the monument itself. This was attended by numerous representatives of authorities and cultural institutions, among them the vice-Ban of Drava Banovina Otmar Pirkmajer, the rector of the Ljubljana University Metod Dolenc, Josip Vidmar of the Slovene Society, and others. The president of the committee Fran Jurca and the writer Fran Saleški Finžgar were among the speakers. After the unveiling, representatives of various societies, institutions and the government laid wreaths by the statue. This was followed by a banquet for the invited dignitaries in the Crafts Hall and, in the evening, a public party with a brass band concert for the wider public.

To accompany the unveiling, the committee organized publishing of a series of postcards with pictures of the ceremony and Cankar's portrait by the painter France Kopač.
