= Verd =

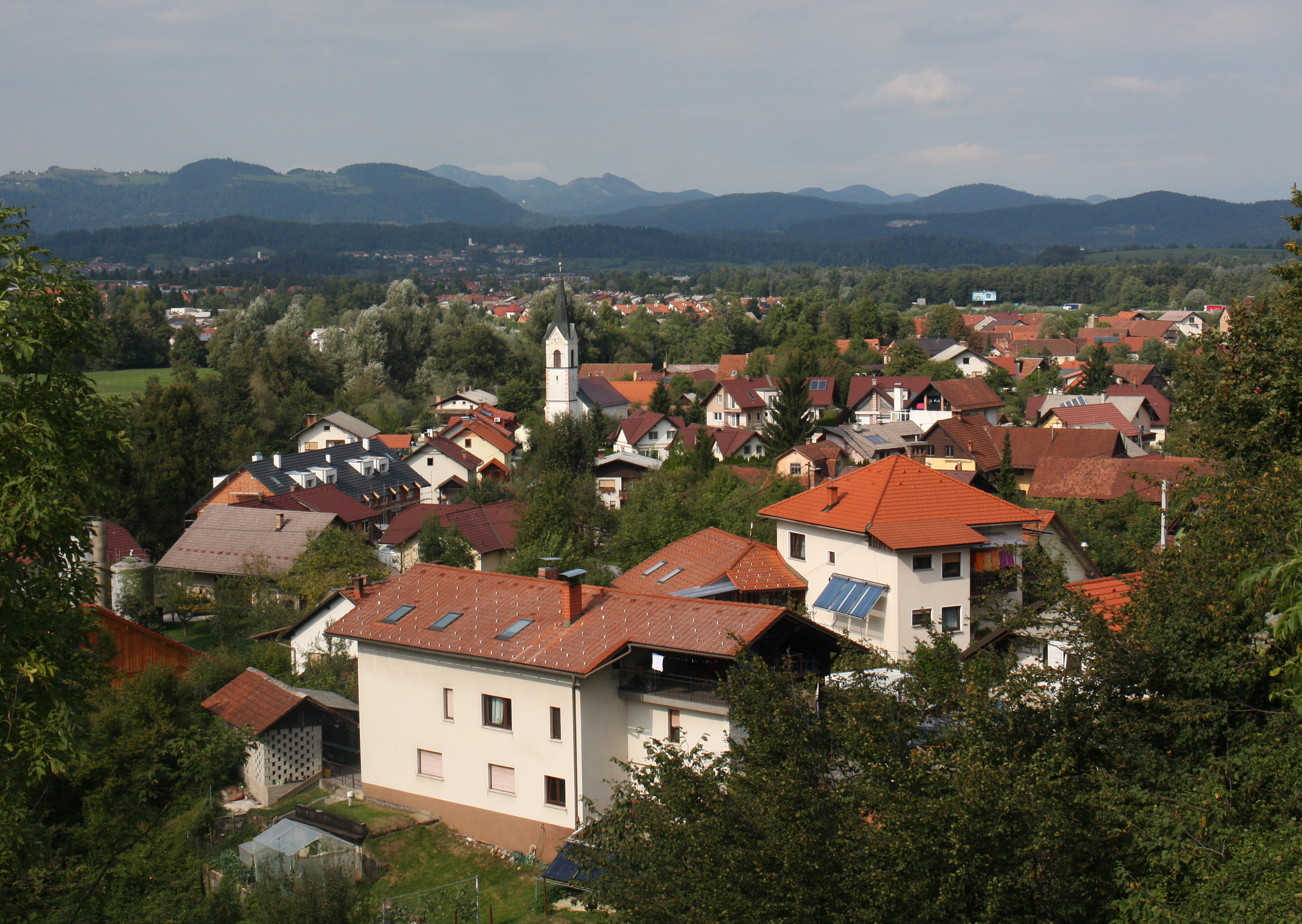
- center of Verd

- Location in Slovenia
- Coordinates: 45°57′11.32″N 14°18′0.16″E
- Country: Slovenia
- Traditional region: Inner Carniola
- Statistical region: Central Slovenia
- Municipality: Vrhnika

Area
  - Total: 8.56 km^{2} (3.31 sq mi)
- Elevation: 294.9 m (968 ft)

Population (2002)
  - Total: 1,834

Verd (pronounced [ˈʋɛɾt]; in older sources also Vrd, German: Werd) is a settlement south of Vrhnika in the Inner Carniola region of Slovenia. The Verd Viaduct on the A1 motorway from Ljubljana to Koper runs above the settlement.

== Geography ==
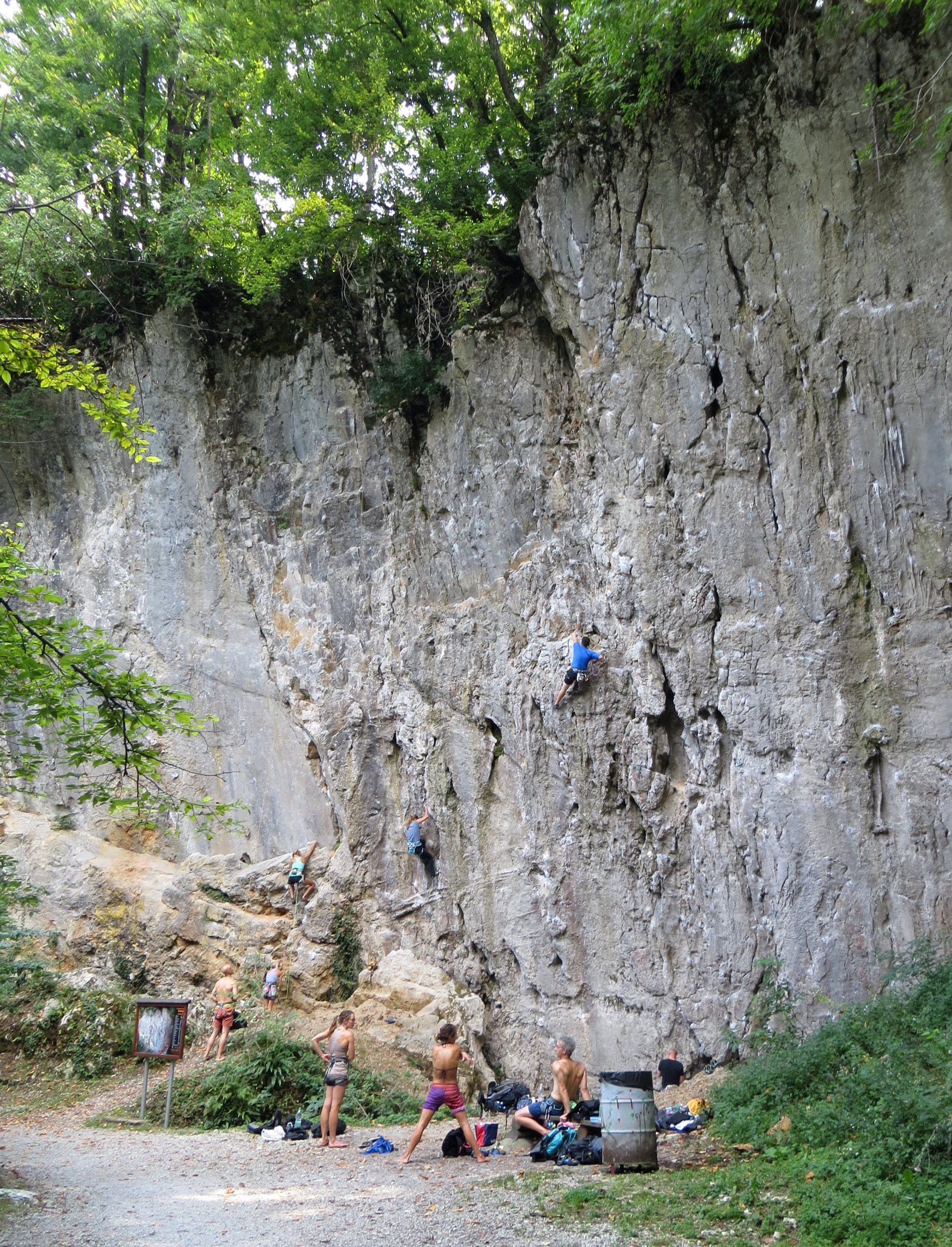
Rock wall above Cliff Spring (part of Retovje Springs) in Verd

Verd is a ribbon village between the foot of Ljubljana Peak (Slovene: Ljubljanski vrh, 819 meters or 2,687 feet) and Retovje Springs. It includes the hamlets of Janezova Vas, Pritiska, Podgora, and Gradar. The soil in the lower part of the settlement is composed of marsh humus, and in the higher parts is brown loam. There is a large quarry on the slope of Javorč Hill (605 meters or 1,985 feet) where limestone is extracted and crushed for use by the railroad. The nearby hills, with a predominantly limestone composition, are heavily forested. There are many karst sinkholes in the area.

== Name ==
Verd was attested in written sources in 1260 as Werde (and as Werd in 1369 and 1370). The name is of German origin, derived from the Middle High German common noun wert 'island, peninsula, higher dry land in or near a wetland'. The name thus refers to the geographical location of the settlement. In the past the German name was Werd.

== Church ==
The local church in Verd is dedicated to Saint Anthony the Hermit and belongs to the Parish of Vrhnika.

== Notable people ==
Notable people that were born or lived in Verd include:

- Jožef Petkovšek (1861–1898), painter
- Matej Sternen (1870–1949), Impressionist painter
