= Baltazar Baebler =

Slovene chemist

Baltazar Baebler (January 24, 1880 – April 30, 1936) was a Slovene chemist.

Baebler was born in Vrhnika. After studying at the University of Vienna from 1899 to 1904, he taught in Idrija. During the interwar period immigrated to Yugoslavia (from what was Italian territory at the time), and lived in Celje and Ljubljana. Baebler was the author of one of the first Slovene chemistry textbooks: Kemija in mineralogija za IV. razred realk in za sorodne šole (Chemistry and Mineralogy for the Fourth Year of Non-Classical Secondary Schools, 1910), helping to establish Slovene terminology in the field. Baebler also wrote poetry in his youth under the pseudonym Potočan. He died in Ljubljana.
