= Močilnik Springs =

Coordinates: 45.956473°N 14.293031°E

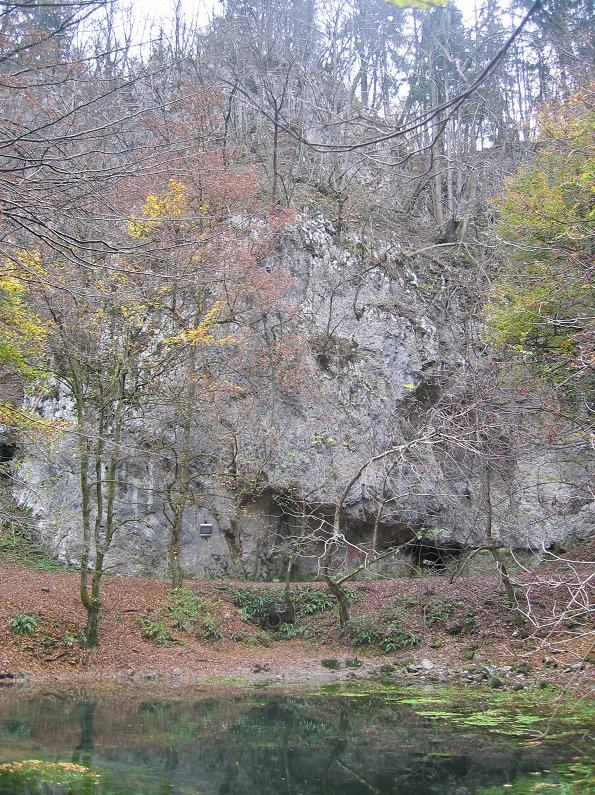
Big Močilnik Spring in the winter

Močilnik Springs is the best-known source of the Ljubljanica River.

== Name ==
The name Močilnik is derived from the Slovene common noun močilnik '(hidden) spring', synonymous with the related word močilo, both derived from the Slavic root *mak- 'wet, damp'.

== Geography ==
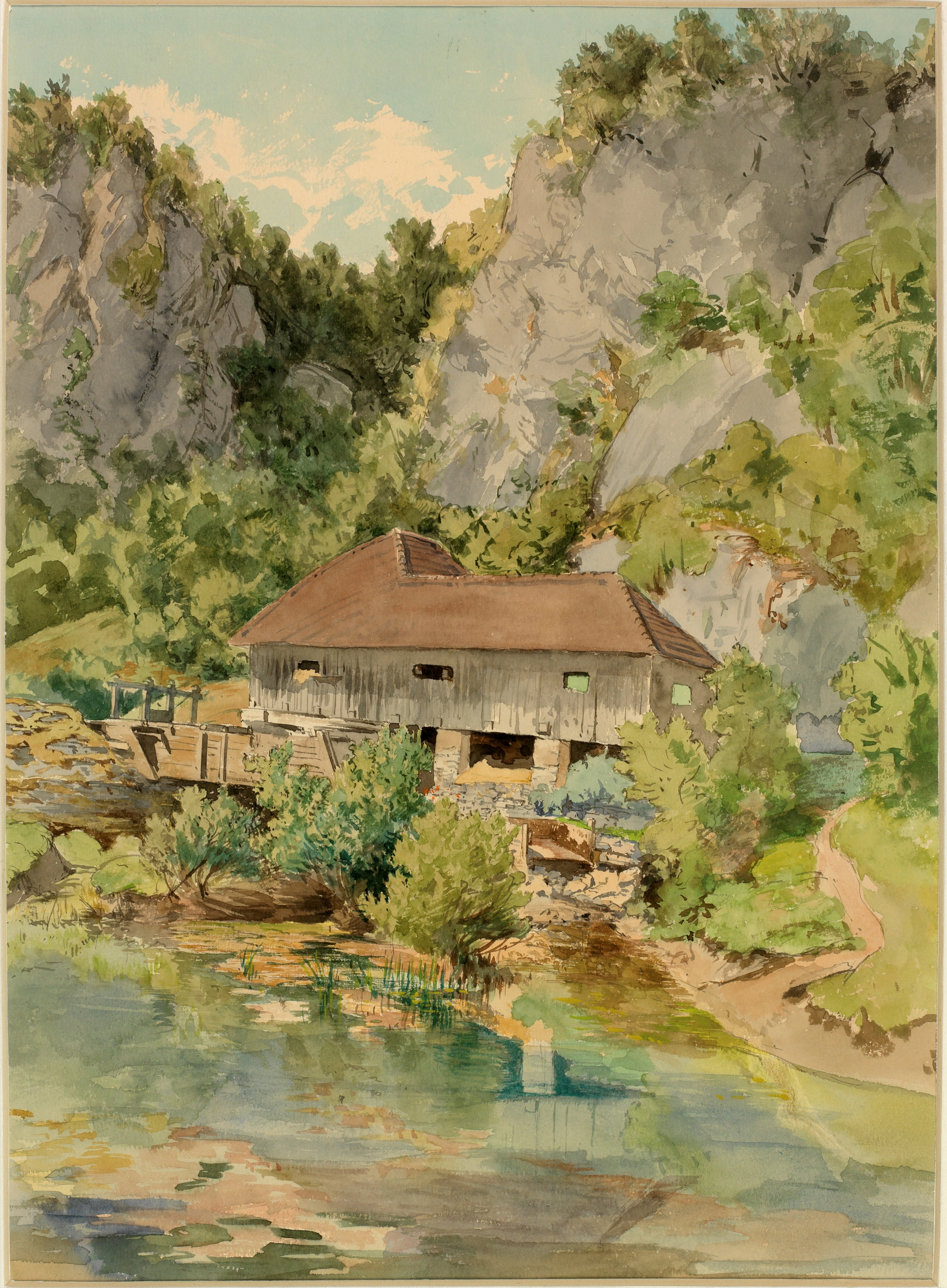
Močilnik by Ladislav Benesch (watercolor, 1887), kept by the National Museum of Slovenia

The springs are located at the end of the Močilnik Valley, a steephead valley 180 m long near Vrhnika. Big Močilnik Spring (Slovene: Veliki Močilnik) is found in a pond below the cliffs, and Little Močilnik Spring (Mali Močilnik), with a smaller flow, lies 50 m further north. They join together to form the Little Ljubljanica River (Mala Ljubljanica), which joins the Big Ljubljanica River (Velika Ljubljanica) after about 1 km, forming the Ljubljanica. The water that surfaces at Močilnik Springs seeps into the ground at the Planina Karst Field and Logatec Karst Field. Not far from Močilnik Springs is Furlan Hot Springs (Furlanove toplice). It has a constant temperature of about 20 °C.

== Cultural references ==
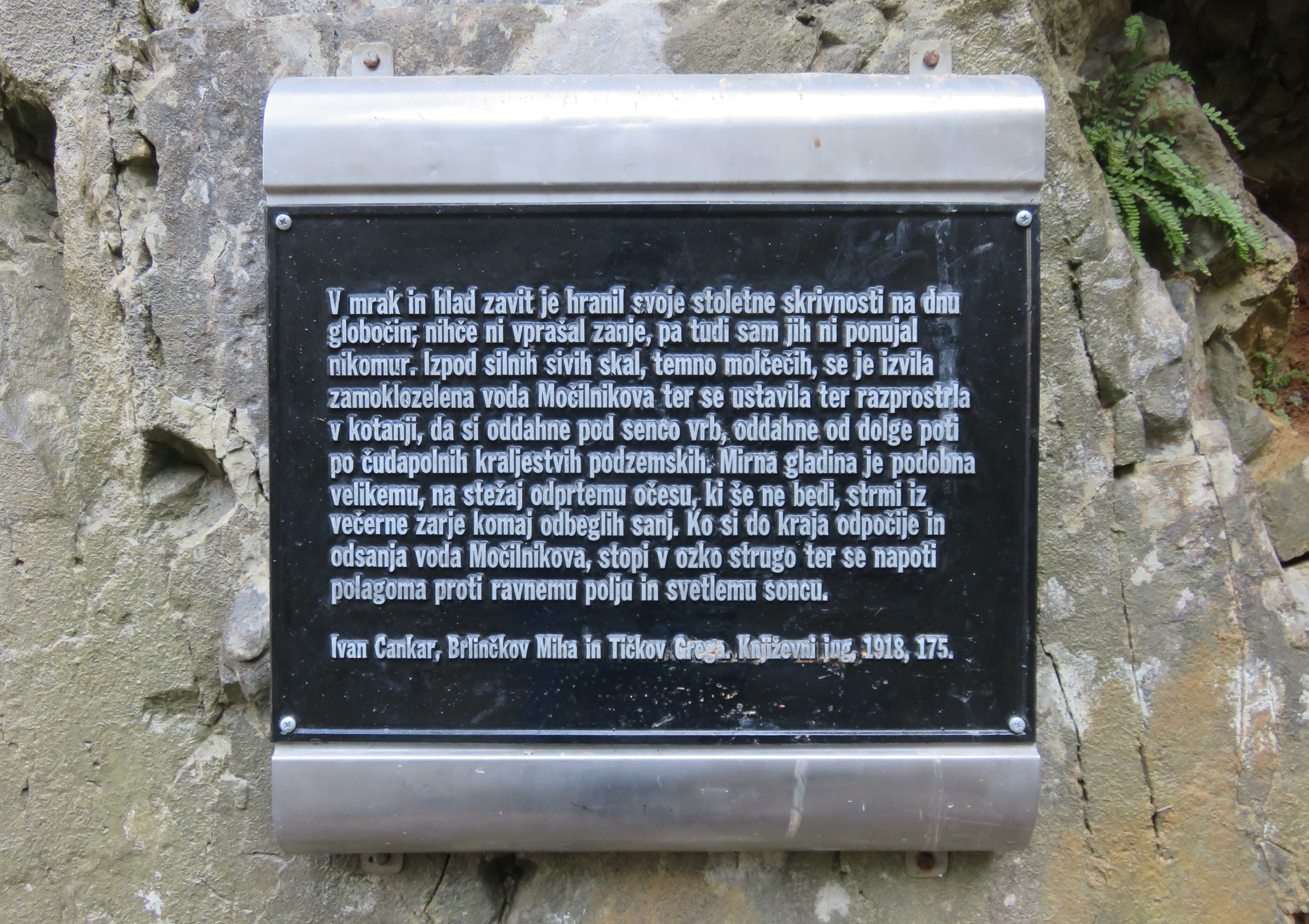
Plaque at Big Močilnik Spring

There is a plaque in the valley next to Big Močilnik Spring with a quotation from Ivan Cankar's story "Brlinčkov Miha in Tičkov Grega" (Miha from the Brlinček Farm and Grega from the Tiček Farm), describing the spring.
