= National Gallery of Slovenia =

- Narodna galerija
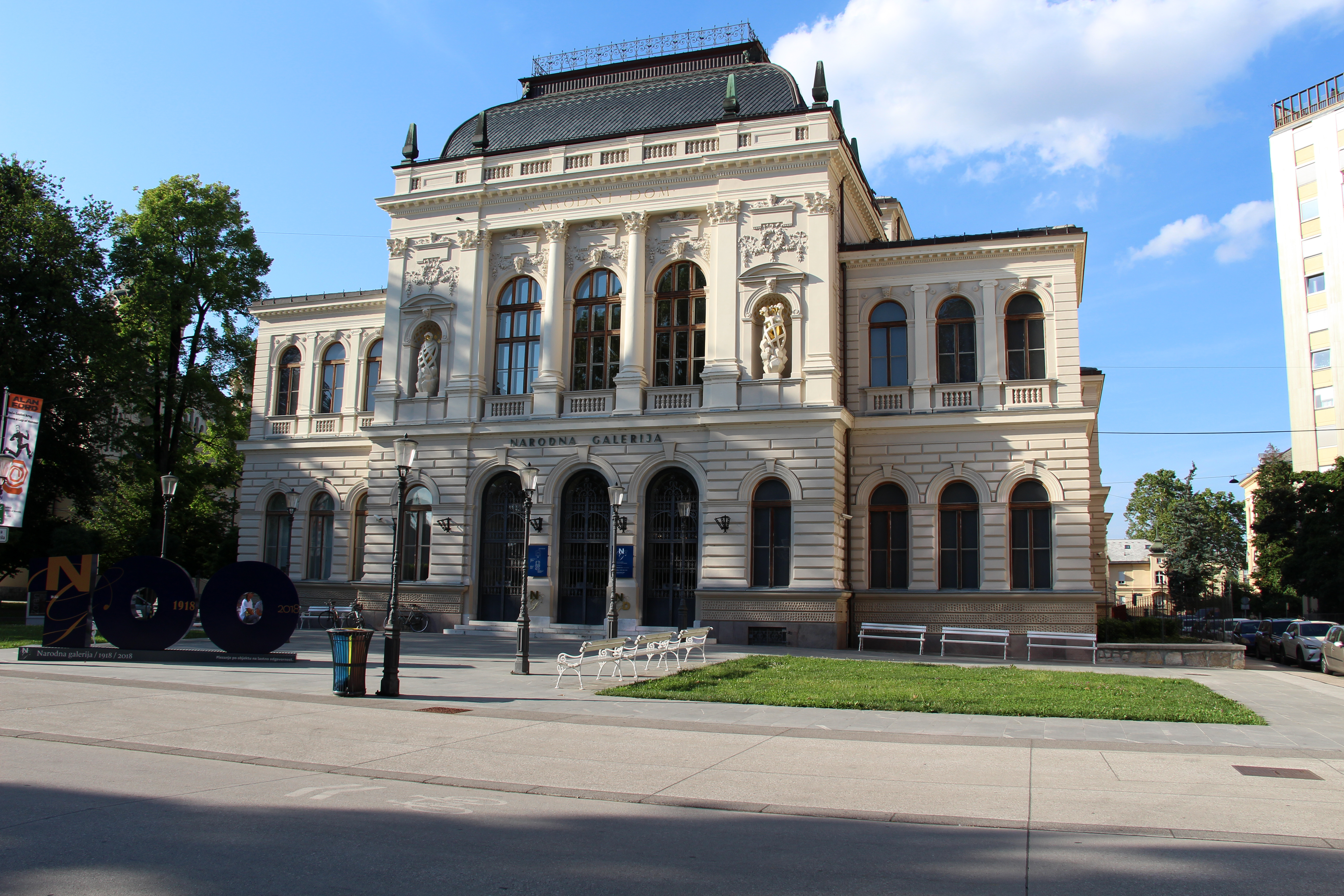
- The main building of the National Gallery of Slovenia in Ljubljana
- Established: 1918
- Location: Ljubljana
- Coordinates: 46°3′13″N 14°30′0″E
- Type: Art gallery
- Website: www.ng-slo.si/en/

The National Gallery of Slovenia (Slovene: Narodna galerija) is the national art gallery of Slovenia. It is located in the capital Ljubljana. It was founded in 1918, after the dissolution of Austria-Hungary and the establishment of the State of Slovenes, Croats and Serbs. Initially, it was hosted in the Kresija Palace of Ljubljana, but moved to the present location in 1925.

== The building ==
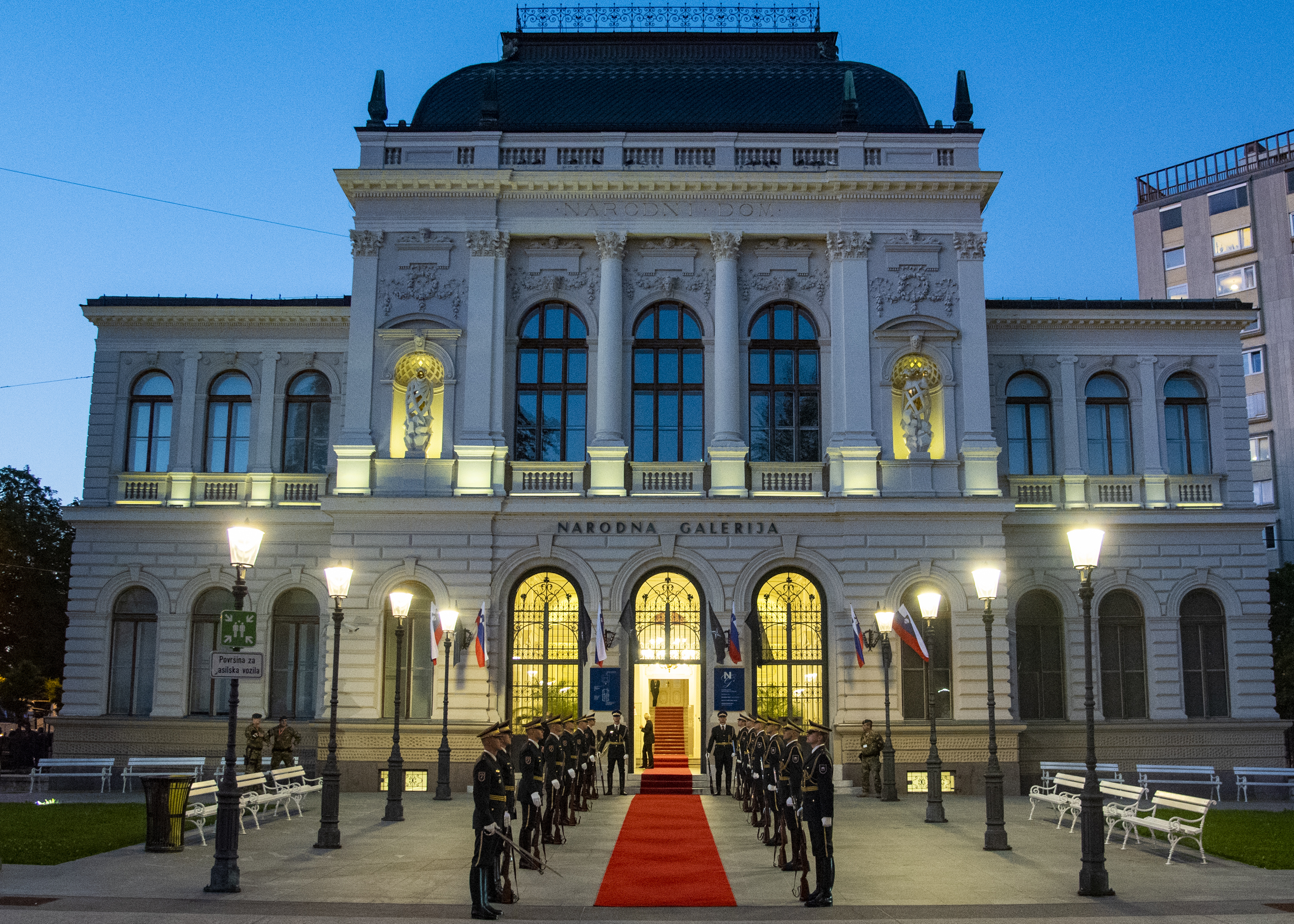
The National Gallery hosts the opening ceremony of the 2019 NATO Military Committee Conference

The present building was built in 1896, during the administration of Mayor Ivan Hribar, whose ambition was to transform Ljubljana into a representative capital of all the Slovene Lands. It was designed by the Czech architect František Škabrout and was first used as a Slovenian cultural center (Narodni dom) as the central seat of various cultural associations of national importance. The building stands near Tivoli Park and was completely renovated in 2013-2016.

In the early 1990s, an extension to the main building was built by the Slovene architect Edvard Ravnikar. In 2001, a large transparent glass gallery, designed by the Sadar + Vuga architecture bureau, was built to connect the two wings of the building.

== The exhibits ==
The gallery hosts a permanent art collection from the Middle Ages to the early 20th century. The original of the Baroque Robba fountain can also be seen in the central glass gallery of the building, where it was moved after extensive restoration in 2008.

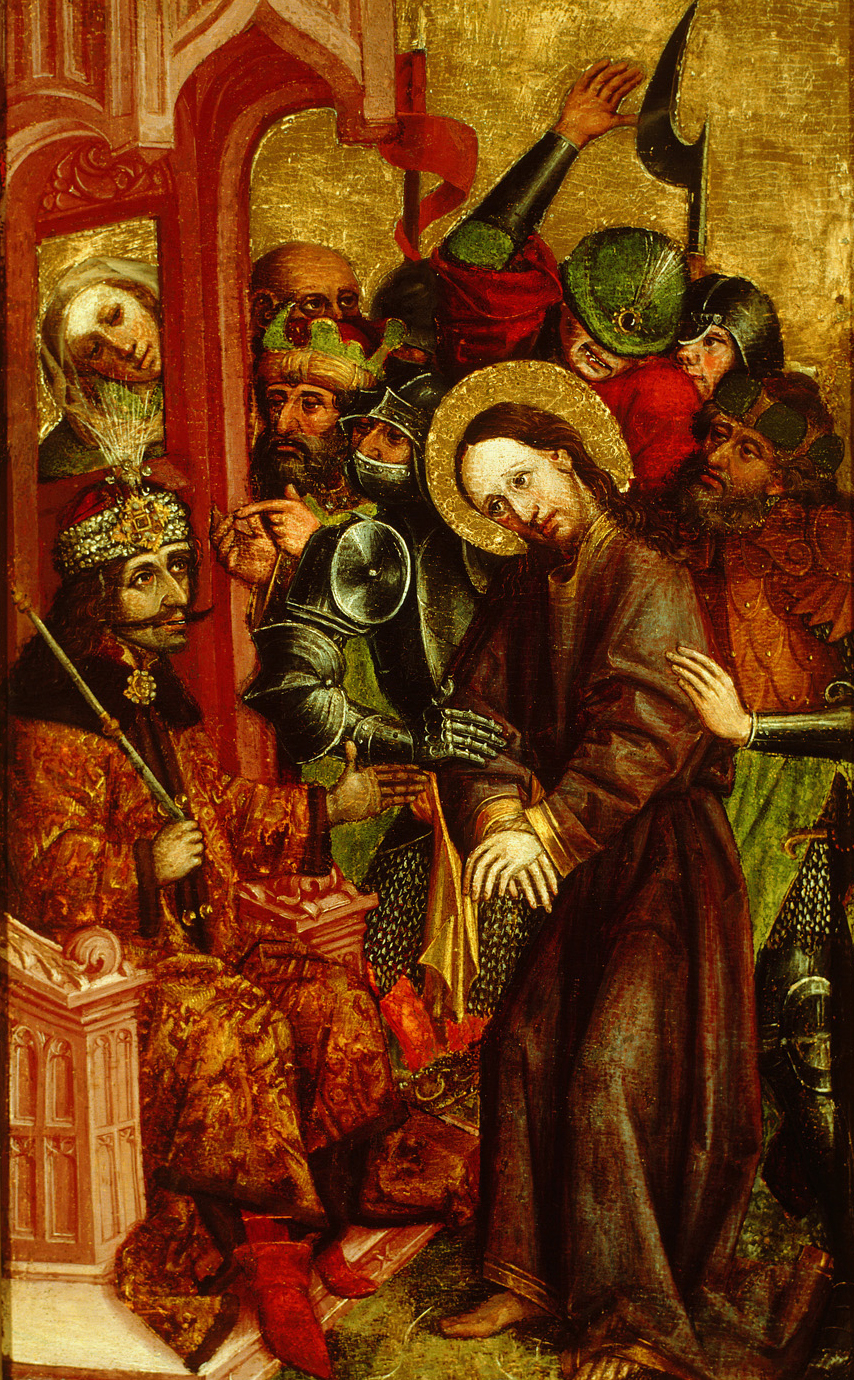
Unknown author: Vlad III the Impaler as Pilate Judging Jesus (15th century)

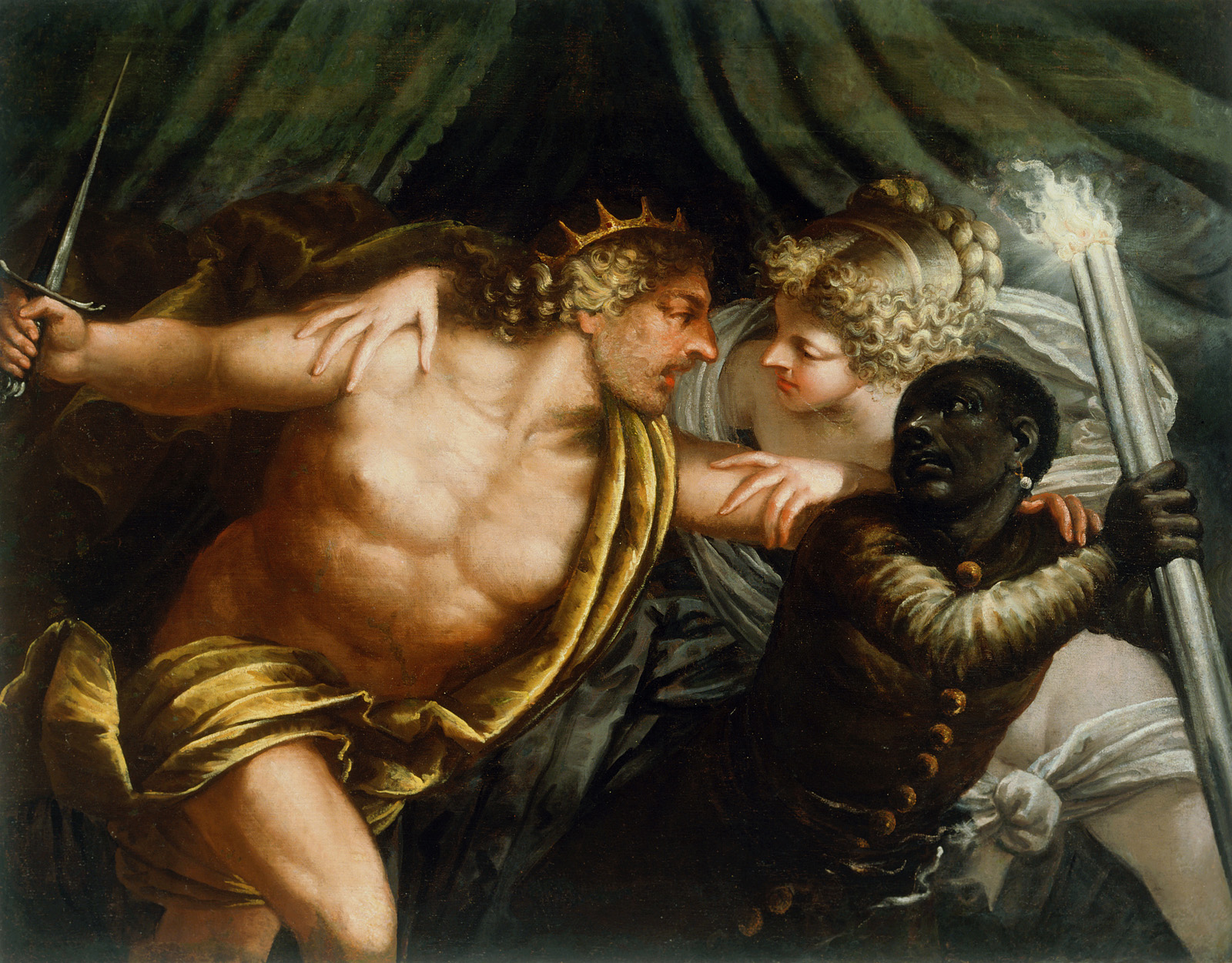
Pietro Liberi: Antiquity Scene (17th century)

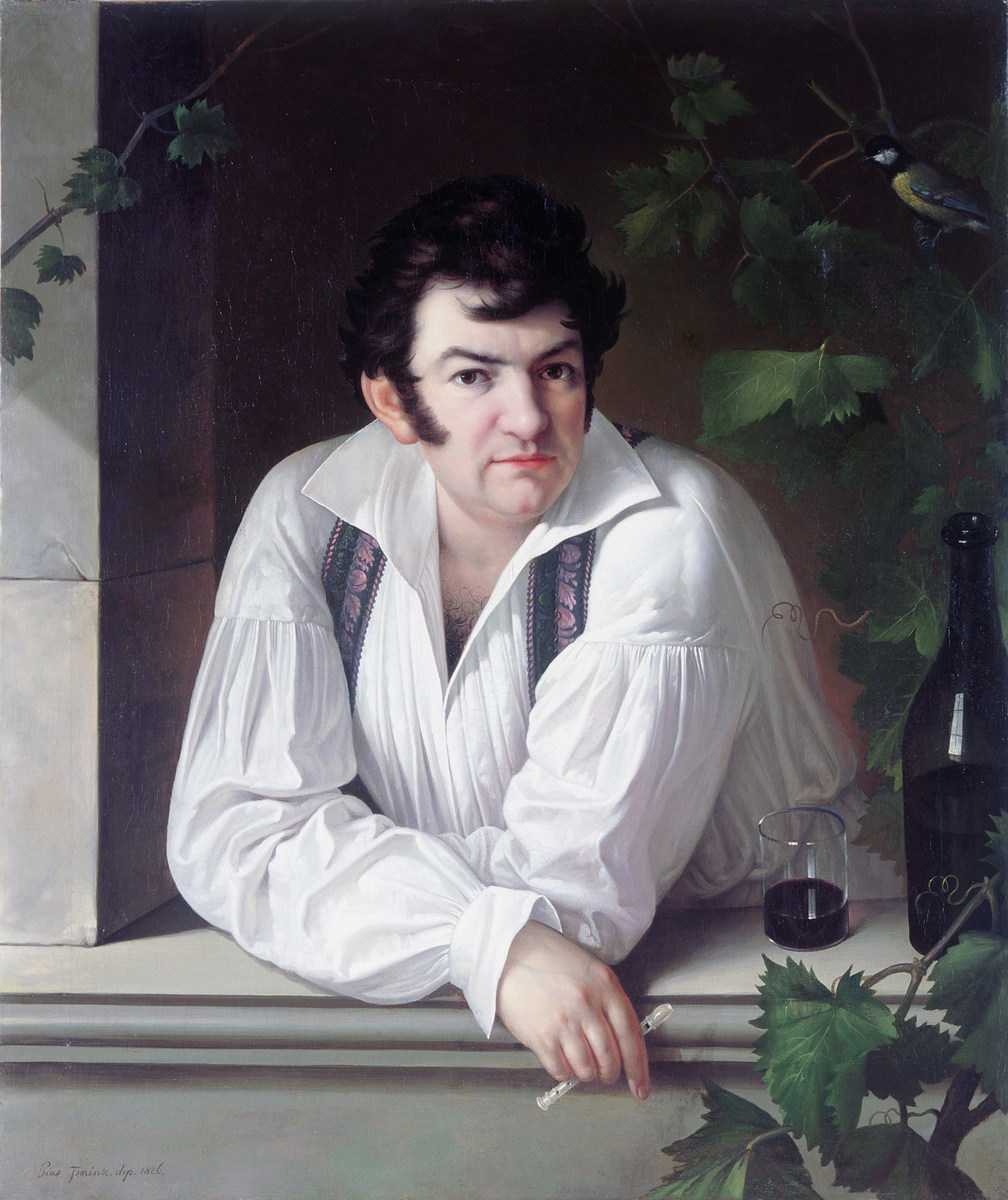
Jožef Tominc: Self-Portrait (1830s)

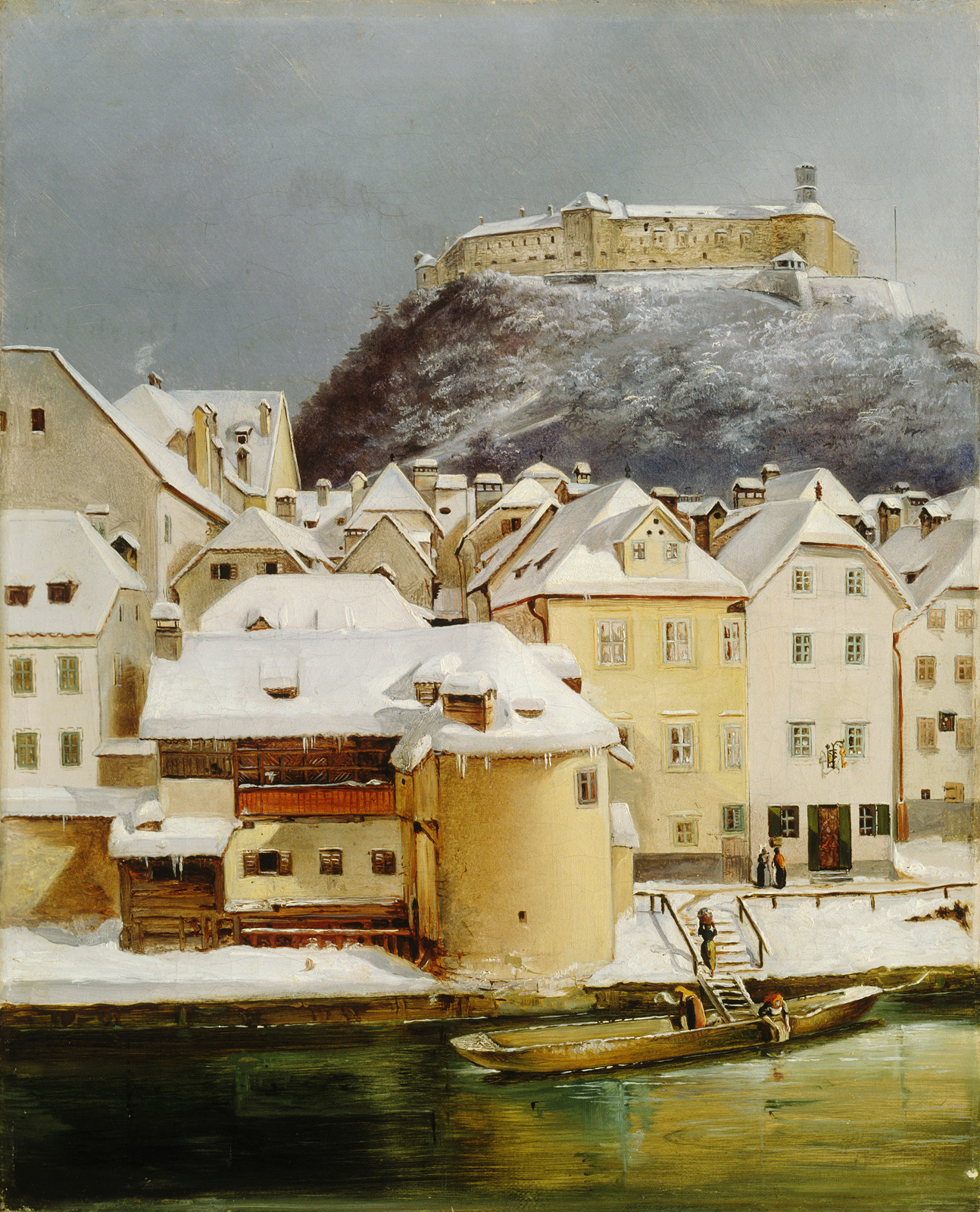
Pavel Künl: Fish Square in Ljubljana ("Ribji trg"), 1847

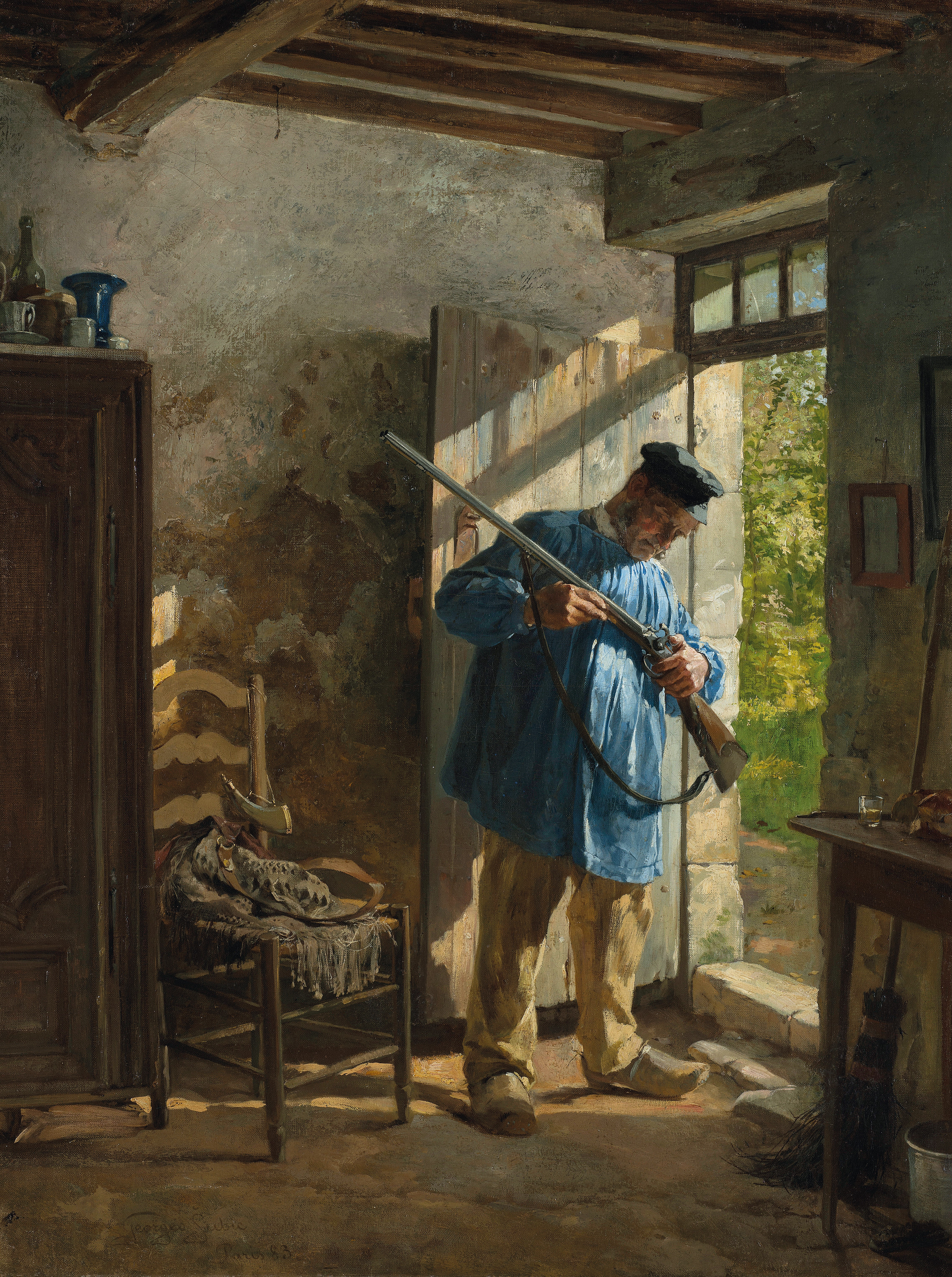
Jurij Šubic: Before the Hunt ("Pred lovom"; 19th century)

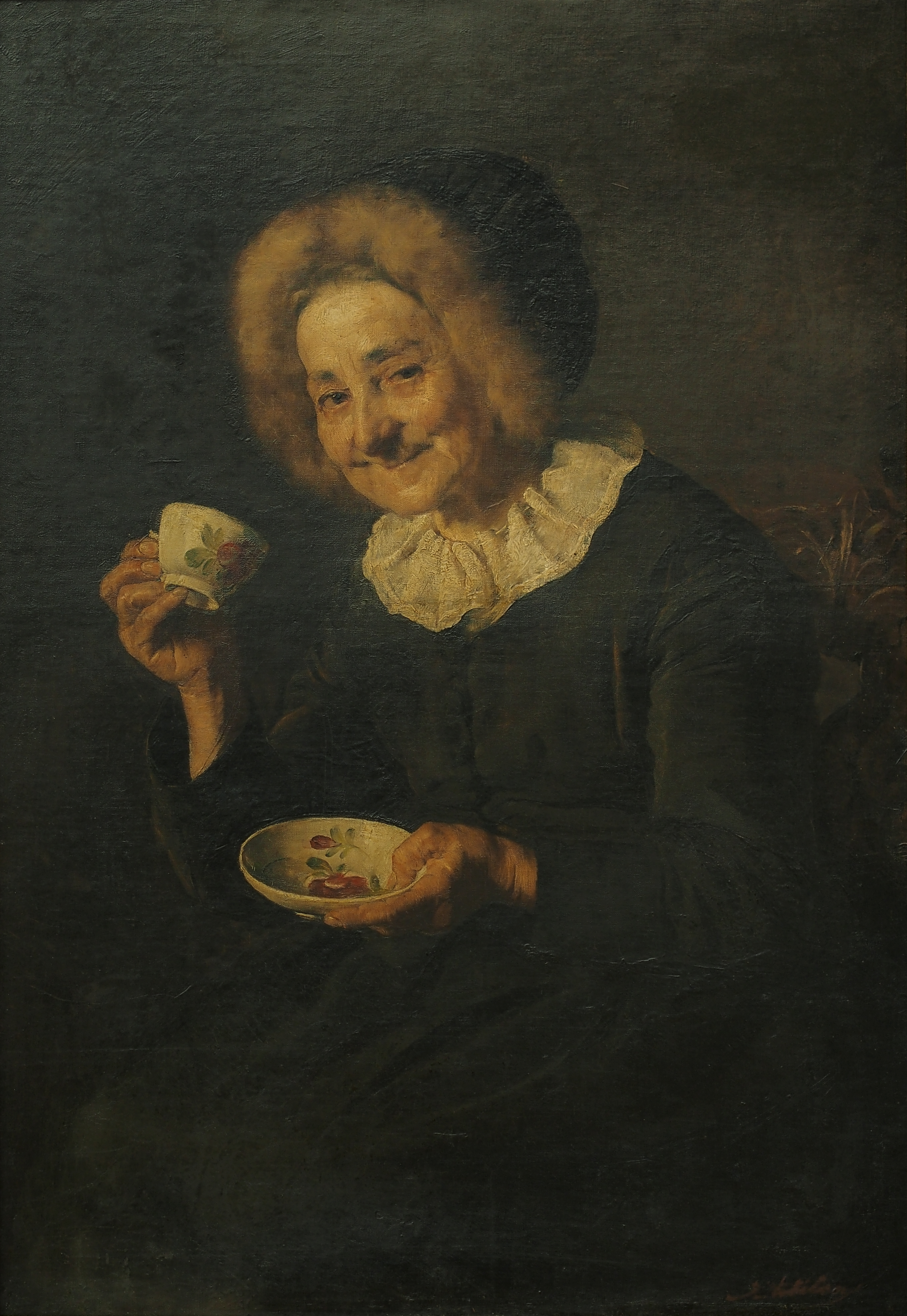
Ivana Kobilca: Coffee Drinker ("Kofetarica"), 19th century

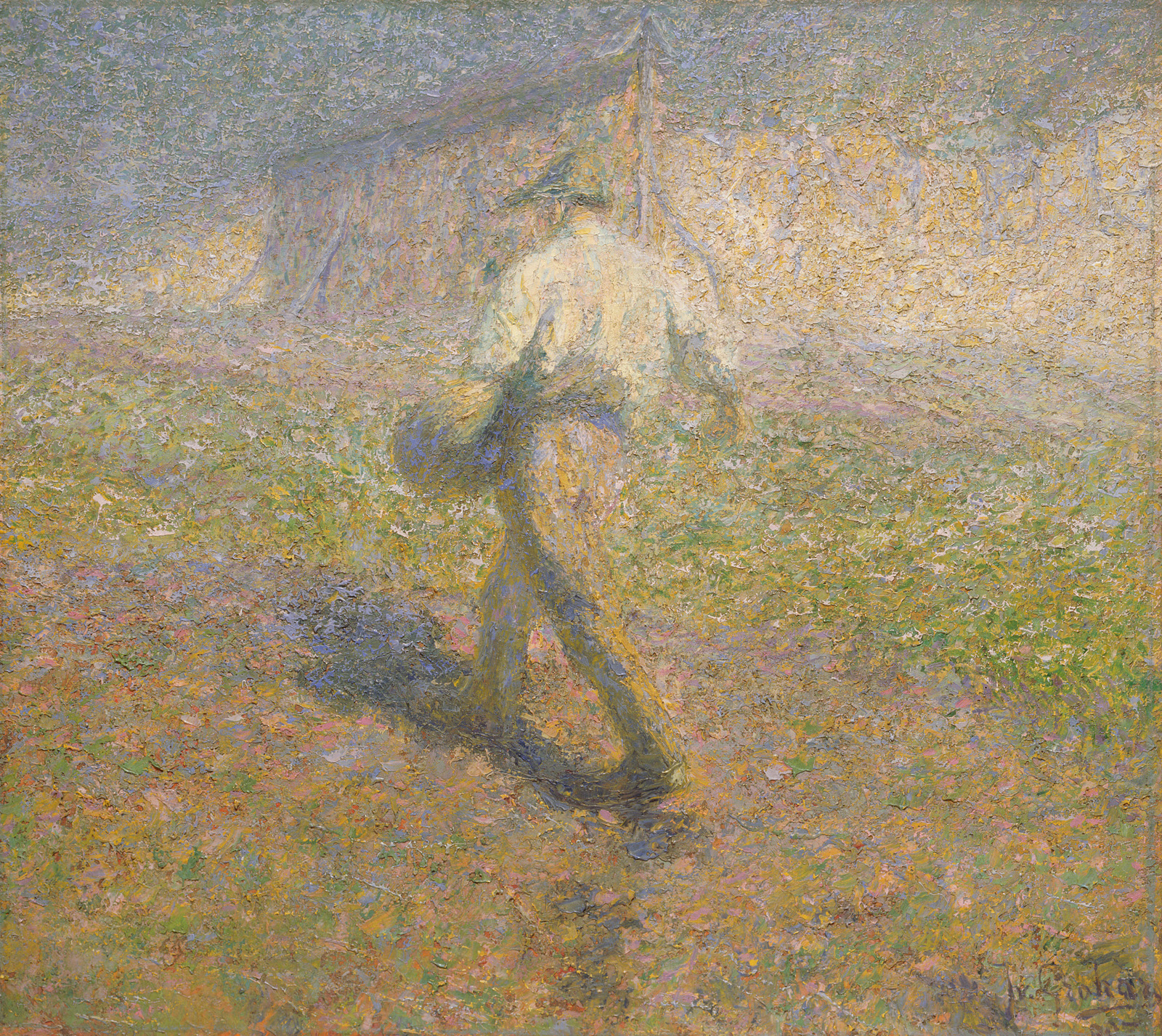
Ivan Grohar: Sower ("Sejalec"; 1907)

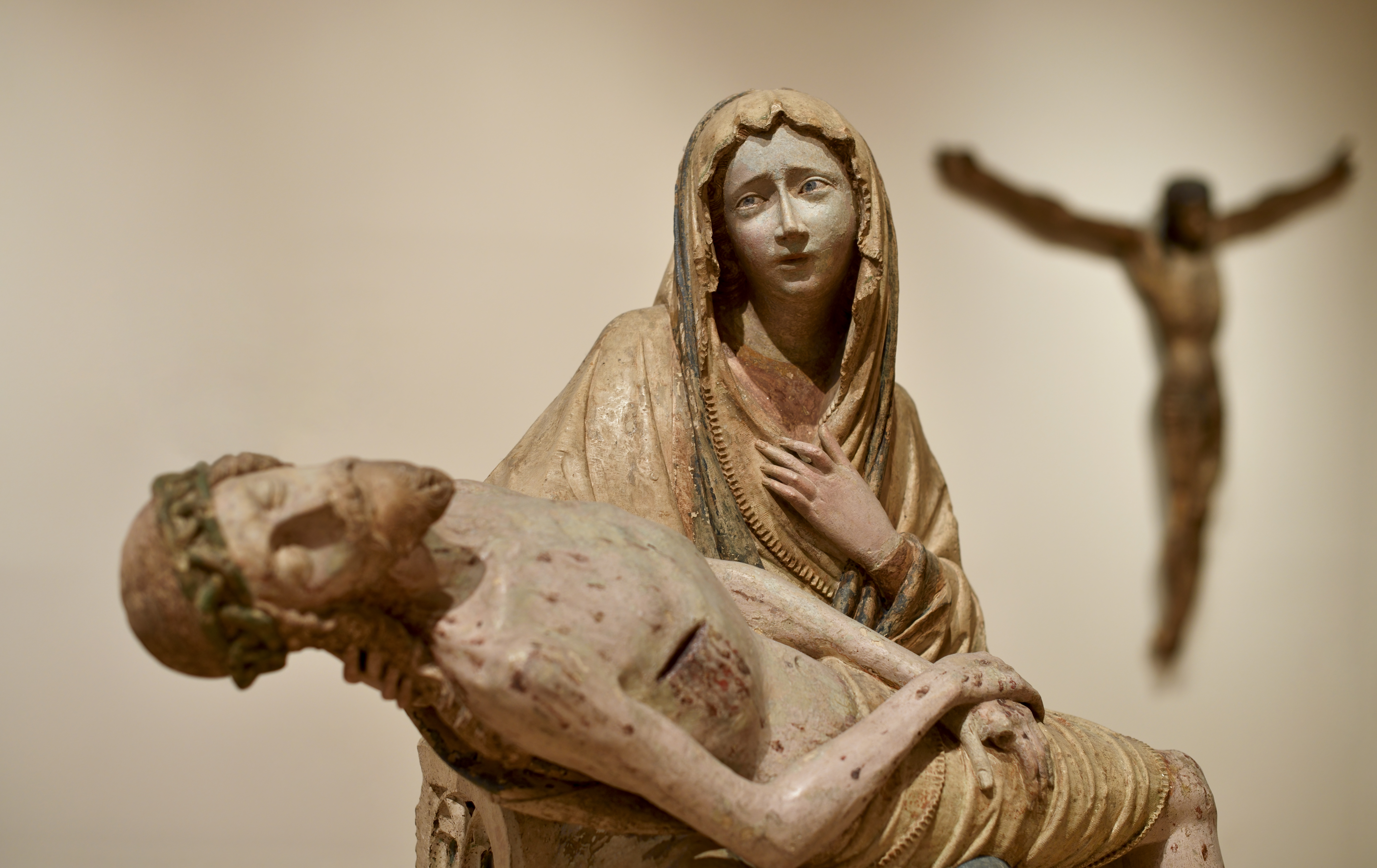
Pieta (1400-1410)

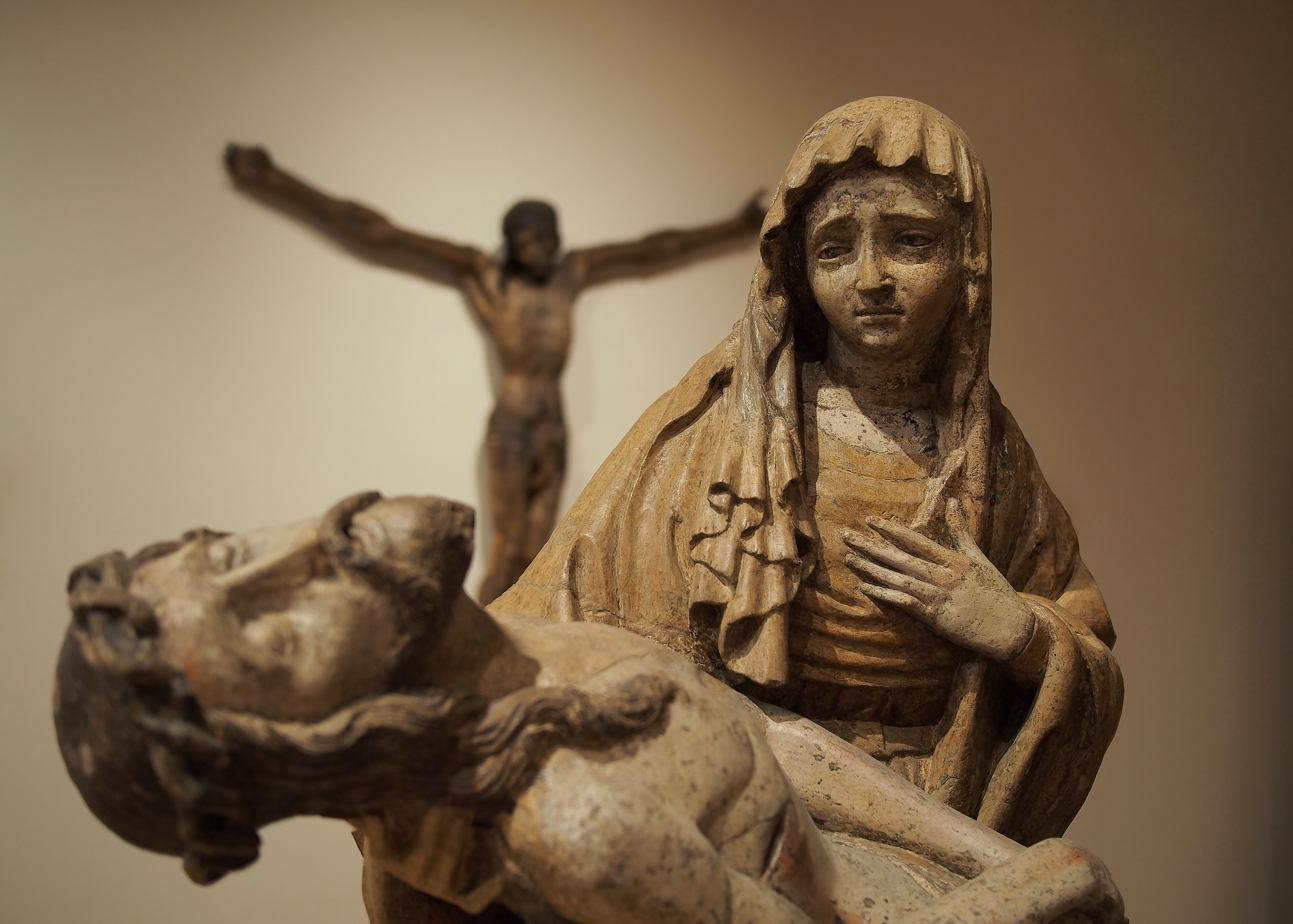
Pieta (1470s)

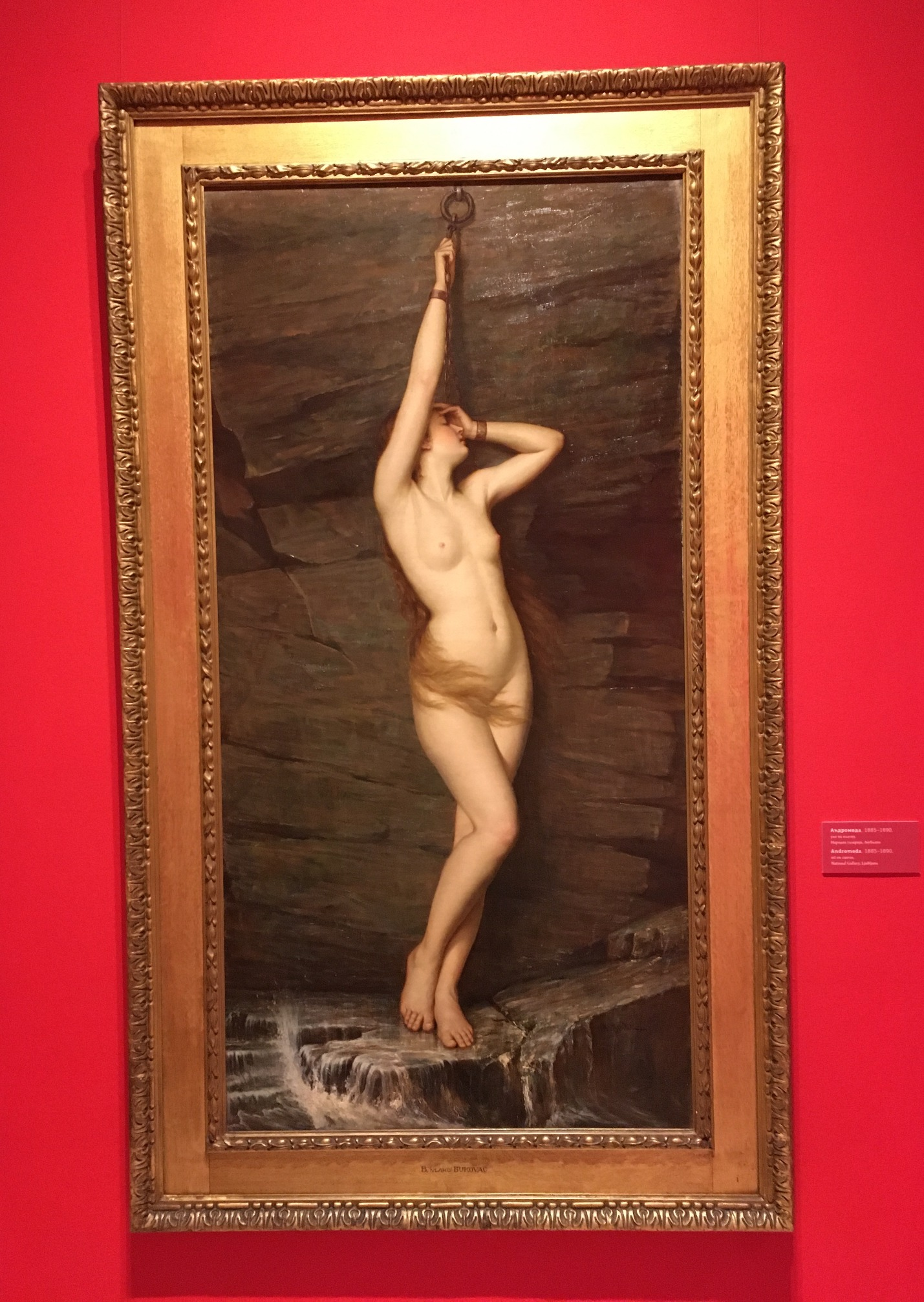
Vlaho Bukovac: Andromeda, 1885-1890

The notable Slovene and European artists whose works are exhibited in the gallery include:

- Anton Ažbe
- Giovanni Baglione
- Franc Berneker
- Renato Birolli
- Massimo Campigli
- Giovanni Andrea Carlone
- Anton Čebej
- Lojze Dolinar
- Frans Francken II
- Friedrich Gauermann
- Ivan Grohar
- Alojz Gangl
- Rihard Jakopič
- Matija Jama
- Abraham Janssens
- Alexej von Jawlensky
- Jacob Jordaens
- Jean Jouvenet
- Ivana Kobilca
- Matevž Langus
- Filipp Malyavin
- Jožef Petkovšek
- Jacob Pynas
- Gerard Seghers
- Matej Sternen
- Janez Šubic
- Jurij Šubic
- Jožef Tominc
- Ivan Vavpotič
- Élisabeth-Louise Vigée-Le Brun
- Cornelis de Wael
- Ivan Zajec
- Petar Dobrović

== See also ==
- Art of Slovenia
- List of art galleries in Slovenia
- List of national galleries
- Museum of Modern Art (Ljubljana)
