= Retovje Springs =

Coordinates: 45.951060°N 14.295935°E

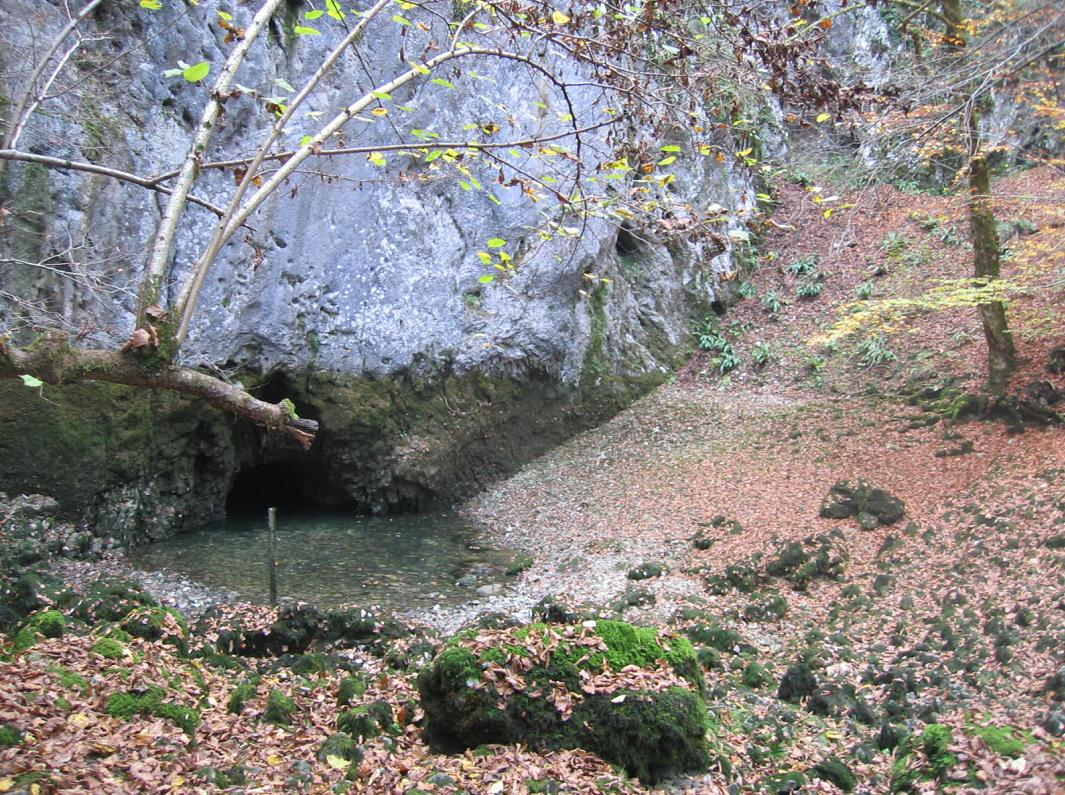
Big Spring during a dry period.

Retovje Springs is a group of springs that join to form the Big Ljubljanica River (Slovene: Velika Ljubljanica).

== Name ==
The name Retovje and names like it (e.g., Retje, Dolnje Retje) are derived from the Slovene common noun retje 'powerful karst spring' from the root *vrětje 'springing, gushing'. The generic term okence in the Slovene name of two springs at the site is a diminutive of the common noun okno (literally, 'window') in the secondary meaning 'spring, place where groundwater surfaces'.

== Geography ==
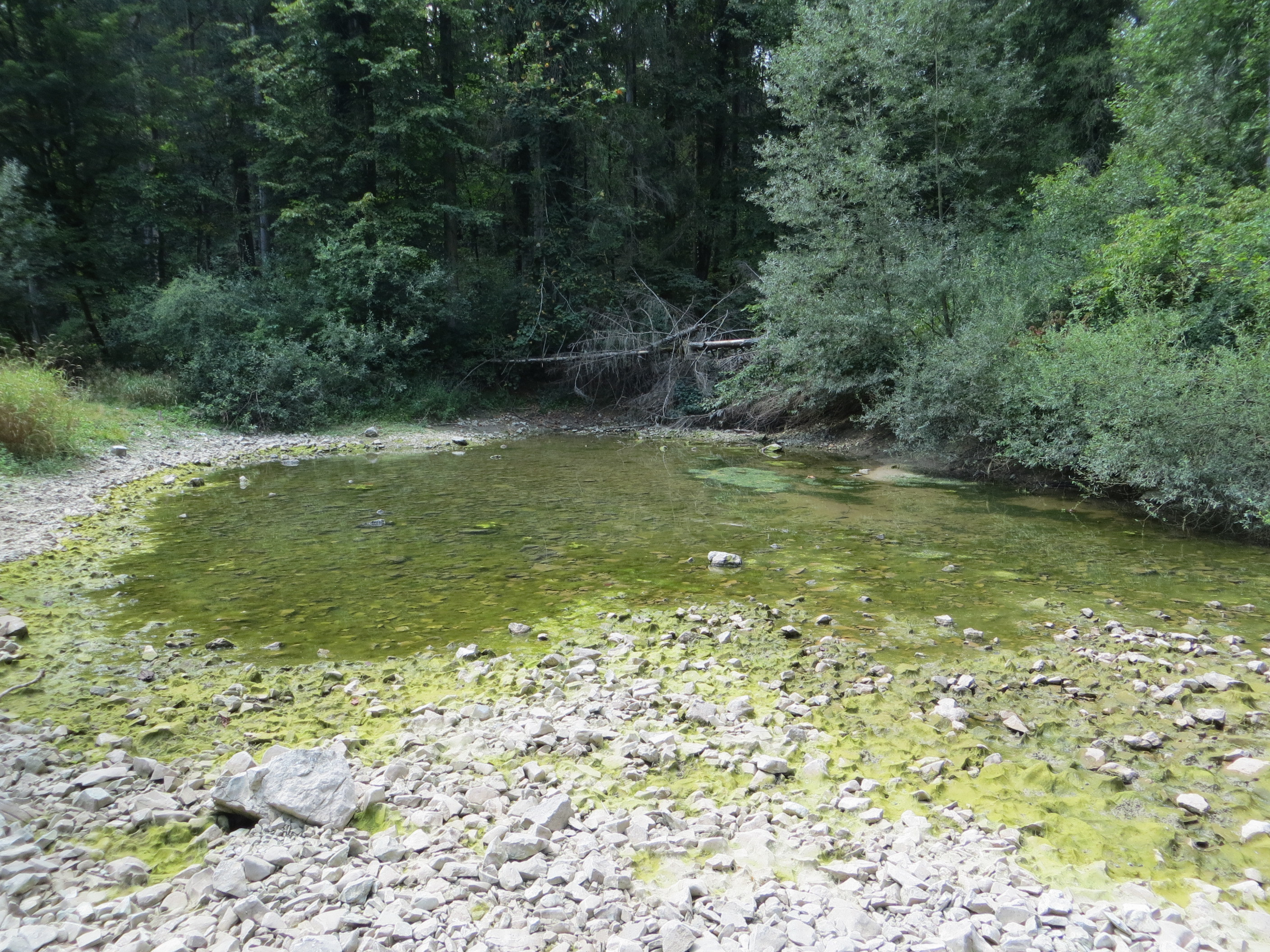
Little Spring during a dry period

The springs are located in the Retovje Valley, a steephead valley near Verd south of Vrhnika. The springs include:

- Walnut Spring (Pod Orehom)
- Cliff Spring (Pod skalo, Pod steno)
- Big Spring (Veliko okence)
- Little Spring (Malo okence)

Big Spring and Little Spring are the two most powerful springs in the group. After almost 1 km, the Big Ljubljanica joins the Little Ljubljanica (Slovene: Mala Ljubljanica) to form the Ljubljanica River.

== Exploration ==
The karst springs and sumps at Retovje were first studied in 1939 by the Kuščer brothers. Big Spring has been explored to a length of 270 m and a depth of 25 m, and Little Spring to a length of 305 m and depth of 45 m.
