= Vrhnika =

- Town
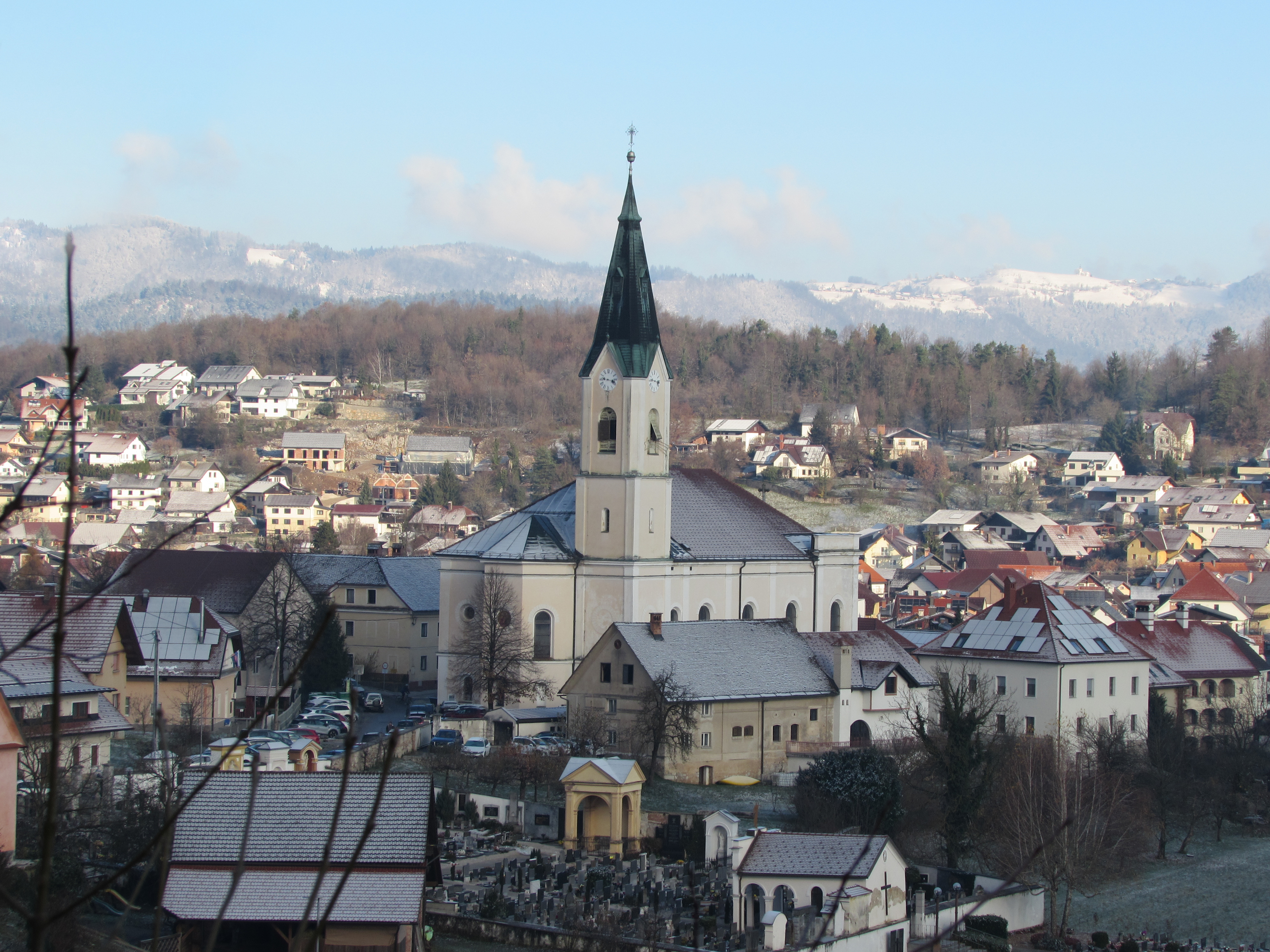
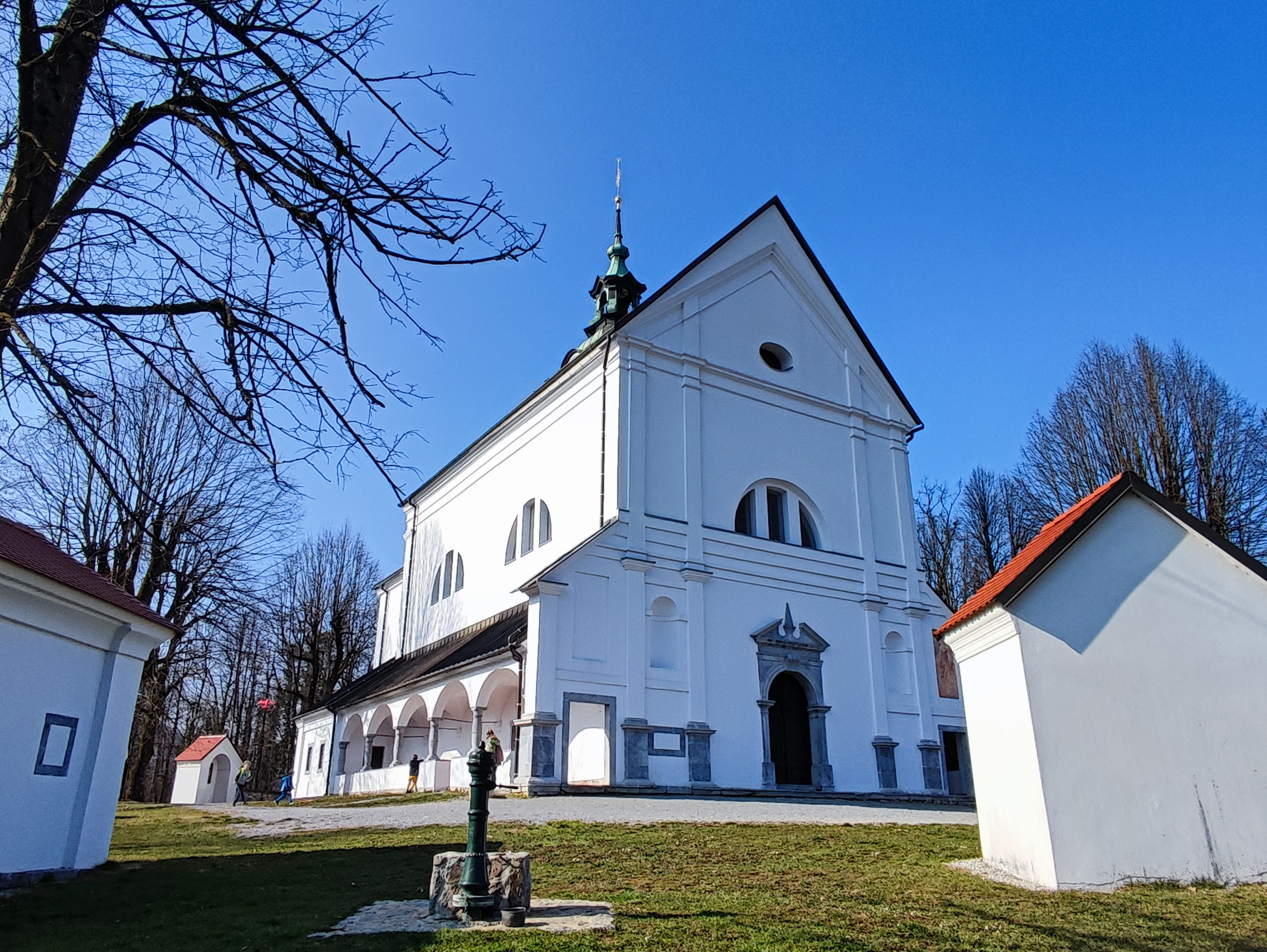
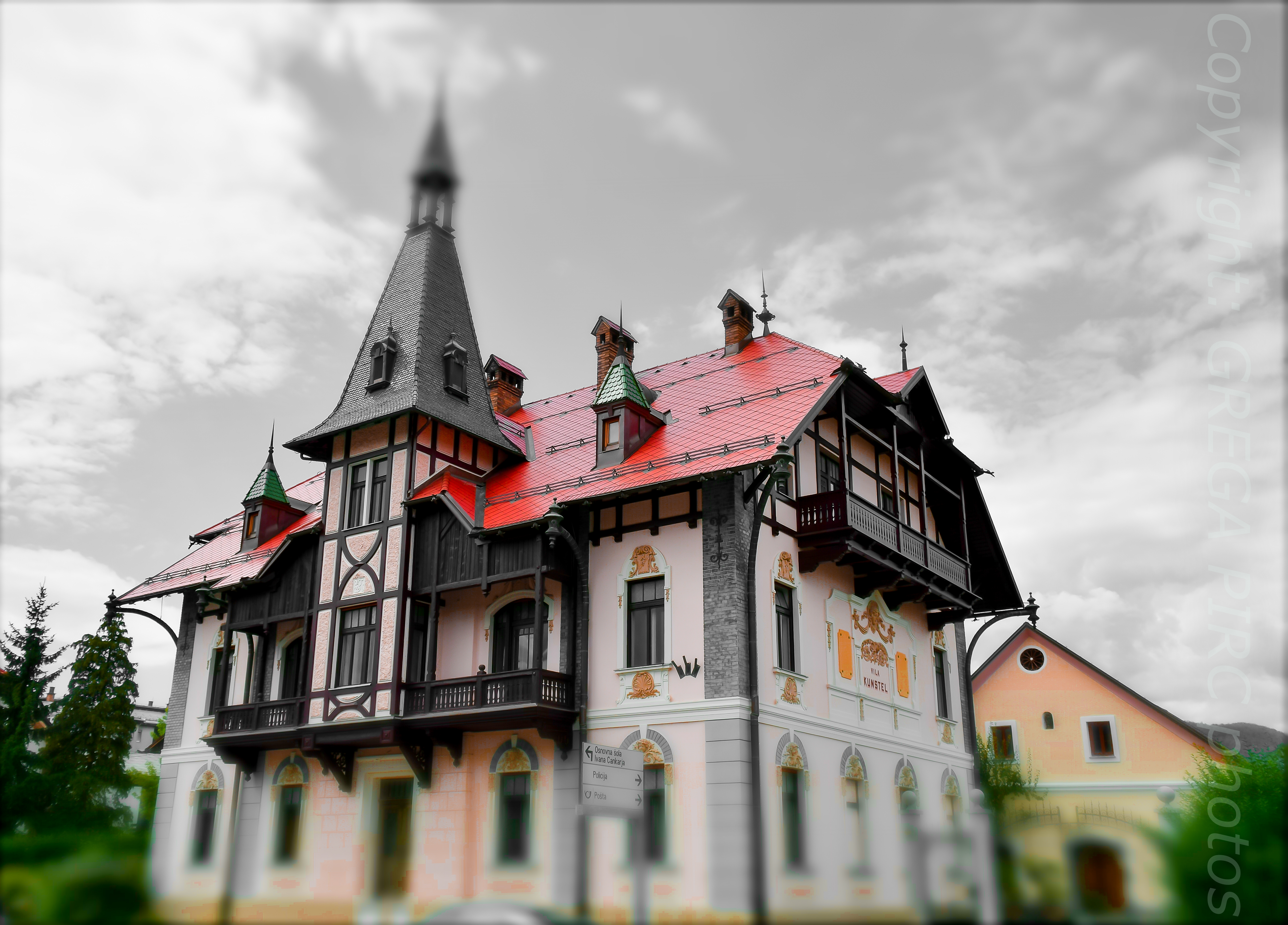
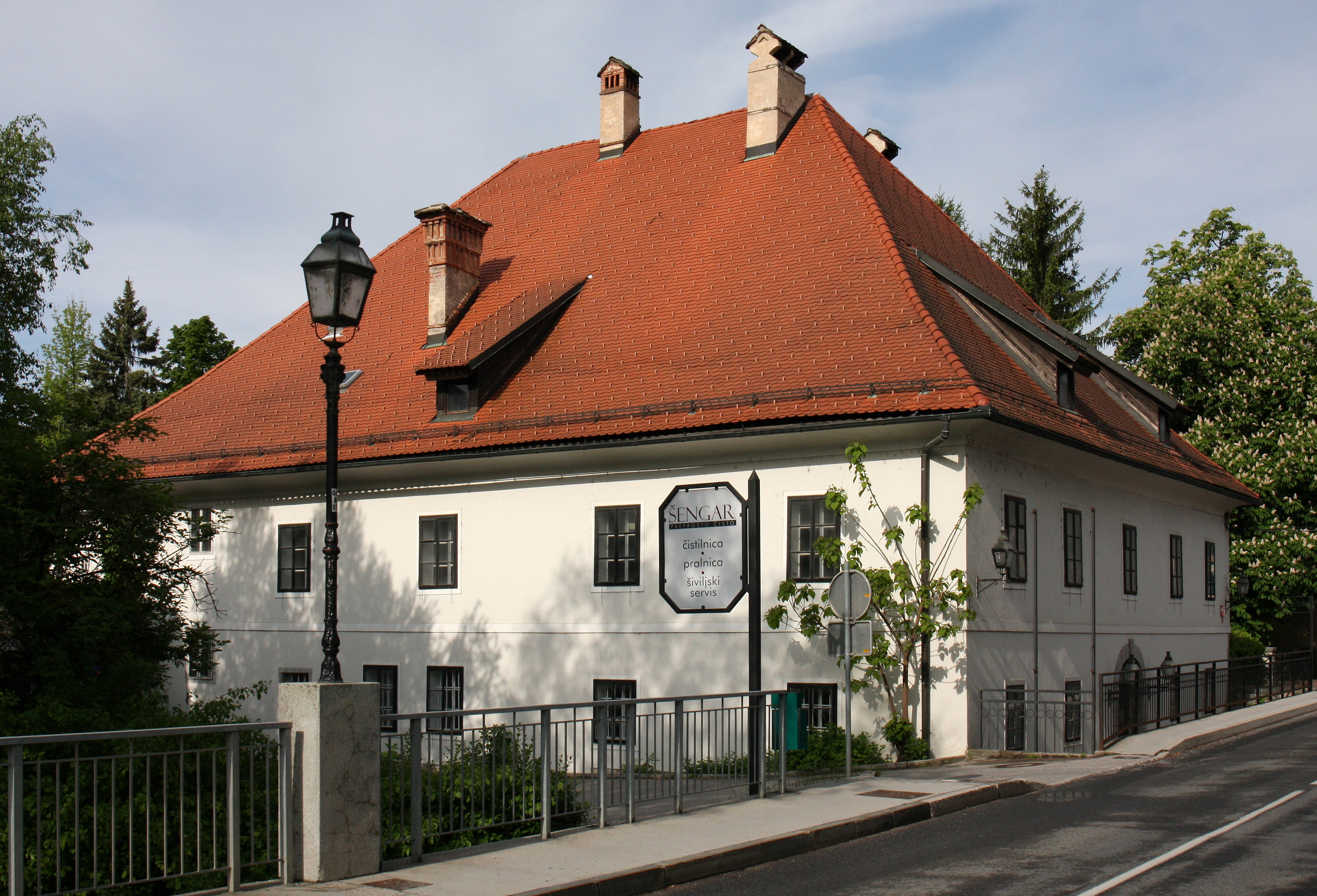
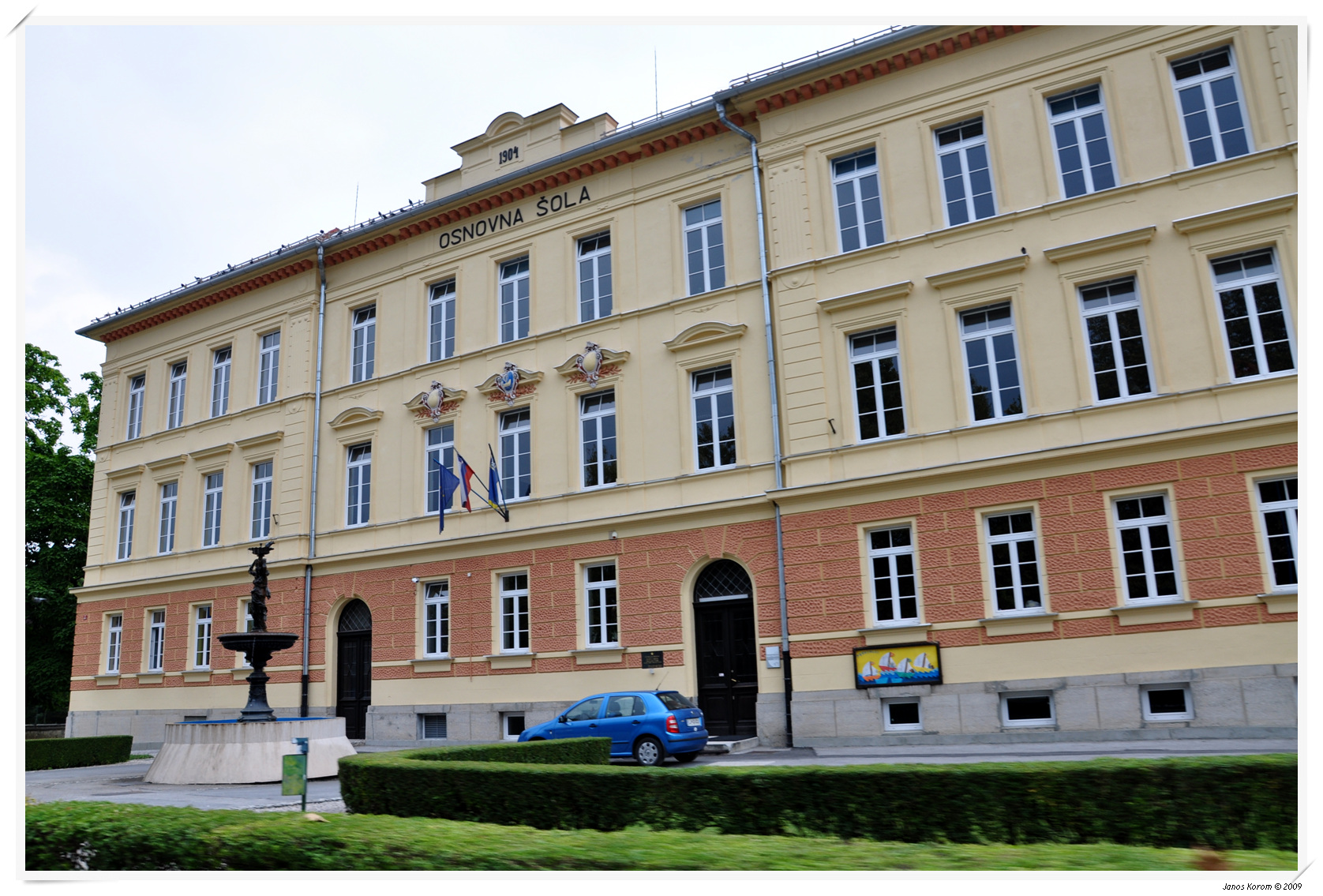
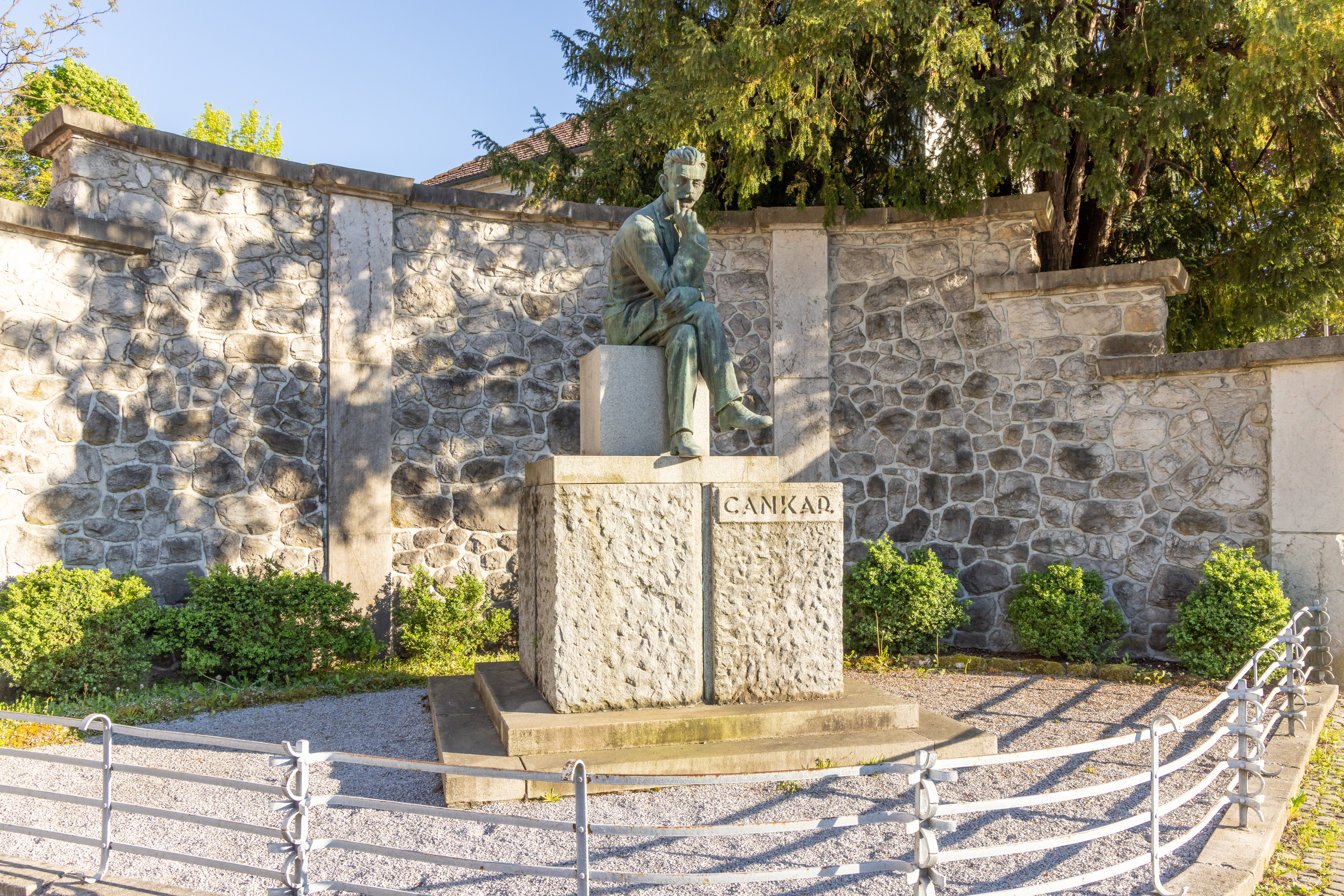
- From top, left to right: View over town center, Holy Trinity Church, Kunstelj Villa, Lavrenčič House, Primary School, Cankar Monument

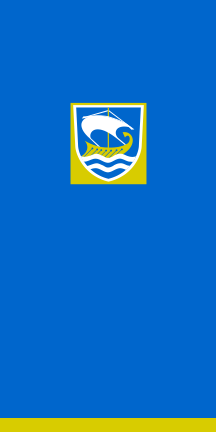
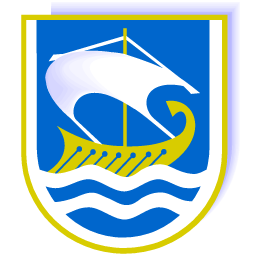
- Flag Coat of arms

- Location in Slovenia
- Coordinates: 45°57′44.55″N 14°17′37.45″E
- Country: Slovenia
- Traditional region: Inner Carniola
- Statistical region: Central Slovenia
- Municipality: Vrhnika

Area
  - Total: 18.9 km^{2} (7.3 sq mi)
- Elevation: 293.1 m (962 ft)

Population (2012)
  - Total: 8,454
- Vehicle registration: LJ

Vrhnika (pronounced [ˈʋə̀ɾxnika]; German: Oberlaibach; Latin: Nauportus) is a town in Slovenia. It is the seat of the Municipality of Vrhnika. It is located on the Ljubljanica River, 21 km from Ljubljana along the A1 motorway.

== Geography ==
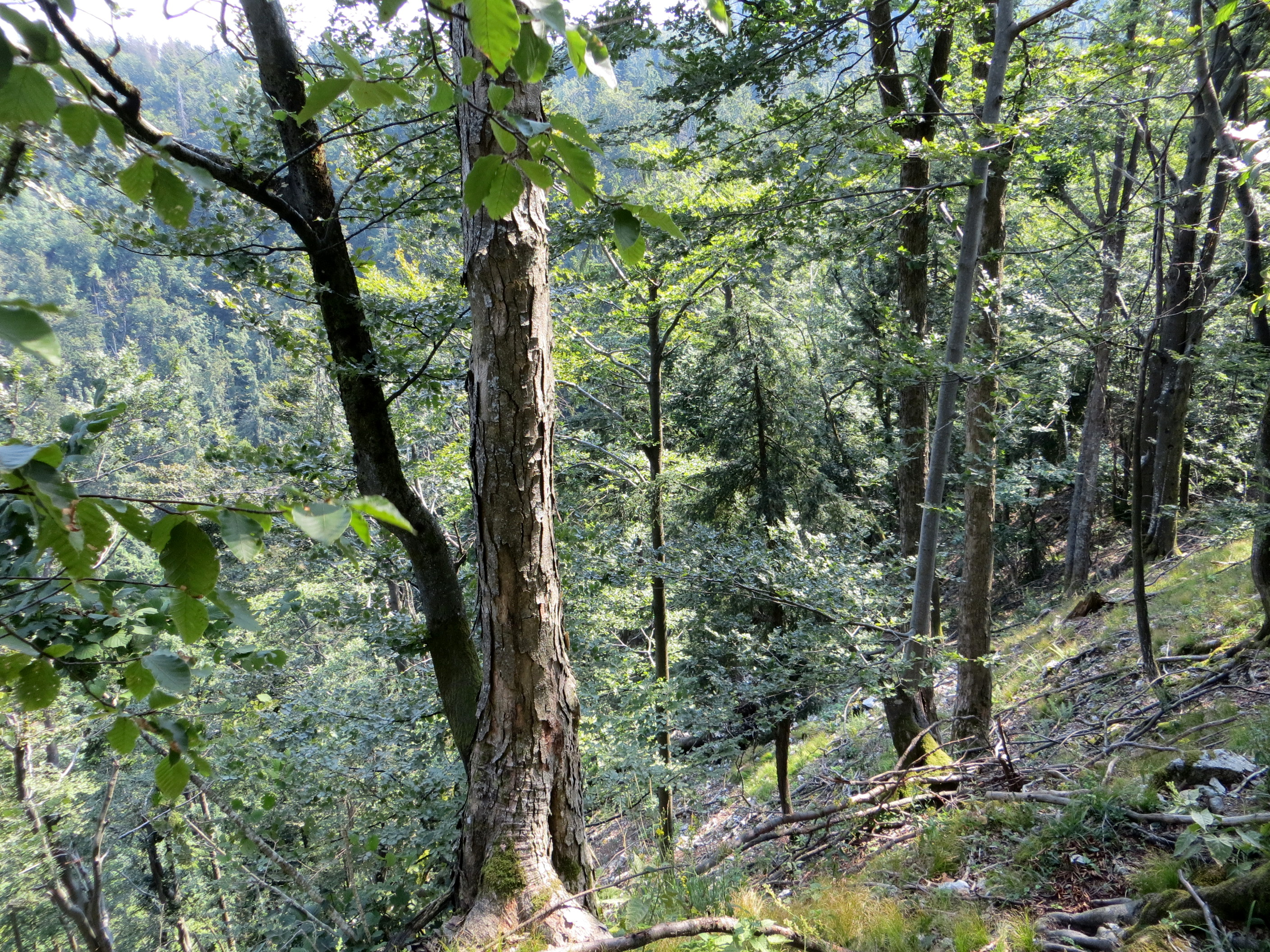
Big Drnovica Collapse Sinkhole

Vrhnika lies at the southwest end of the Ljubljana Marsh near the sources of the Ljubljanica River, where the Ljubljana Basin opens up between the foot of Ljubljana Peak (Slovene: Ljubljanski vrh, 819 meters or 2,687 feet) and Ulovka Hill (801 meters or 2,628 feet). Močilnik Springs is located south of the settlement; together with nearby Retovje Springs, water flows mainly from the subterranean streams of the Unica to produce the Little Ljubljanica River (Mala Ljubljanica) and Big Ljubljanica River (Velika Ljubljanica), which in turn join to create the Ljubljanica River. The territory of the town extends south onto the Logatec Plateau (Slovene: Logaška planota), where the Big and Little Drnovica Collapse Sinkholes (Slovene: Velika Drnovica, Mala Drnovica) are found.

== Name ==
The settlement at the location of today's Vrhnika was attested in antiquity as Nauportus in Latin, and as Ναύποντος and Νάμπορτος in Greek. Medieval attestations of the name include de superiory Laybaco in 1300, Oberlaybach in 1308 (and Ober Laybach in 1309), and Vernich in 1481, corresponding to the modern Slovene name. Historically, the town was known as Oberlaibach (literally, 'Upper Ljubljana') in standard German. The Slovene toponym is probably a compound of vrh 'top, summit' + nika or nikve 'creek, spring', referring to the source of the Ljubljanica River. The Latin name Nauportus is a compound of navis 'boat' + portus 'transfer', referring to a place where cargo had to be transferred from boats to pack animals or carts along a trade route. A mythological reinterpretation of the Latin name as referring to the portage of a boat itself (specifically, the Argo) appears in Pliny the Elder's Natural History. A depiction of the Argo also appears on the town's coat of arms.

== History ==
In Roman times, Nauportus was an important communication point. Vrhnika as it exists today started to develop in the High Middle Ages.

Vrhnika became a market town and was among the wealthiest towns in Carniola up to the early 18th century, when it started to lose importance. Nevertheless, it remained one of main transportation junctions in Inner Austria because of its strategic location on the crossroads between the trade routes from Trieste to Vienna and from Rijeka to Klagenfurt. The development of the town was strongly impaired by the construction of the Austrian Southern Railway in the 1840s, which bypassed it. From then on, it started losing importance, becoming a satellite town of Ljubljana, which it has remained up to this day.

Historical population
Year	1948	1953	1961	1971	1981	1991	2002	2011	2021
Pop.	2,882	3,347	3,924	4,849	6,718	7,056	7,520	8,413	8,889
±%	—	+16.1%	+17.2%	+23.6%	+38.5%	+5.0%	+6.6%	+11.9%	+5.7%
Population size may be affected by changes in administrative divisions.

=== Mass grave ===
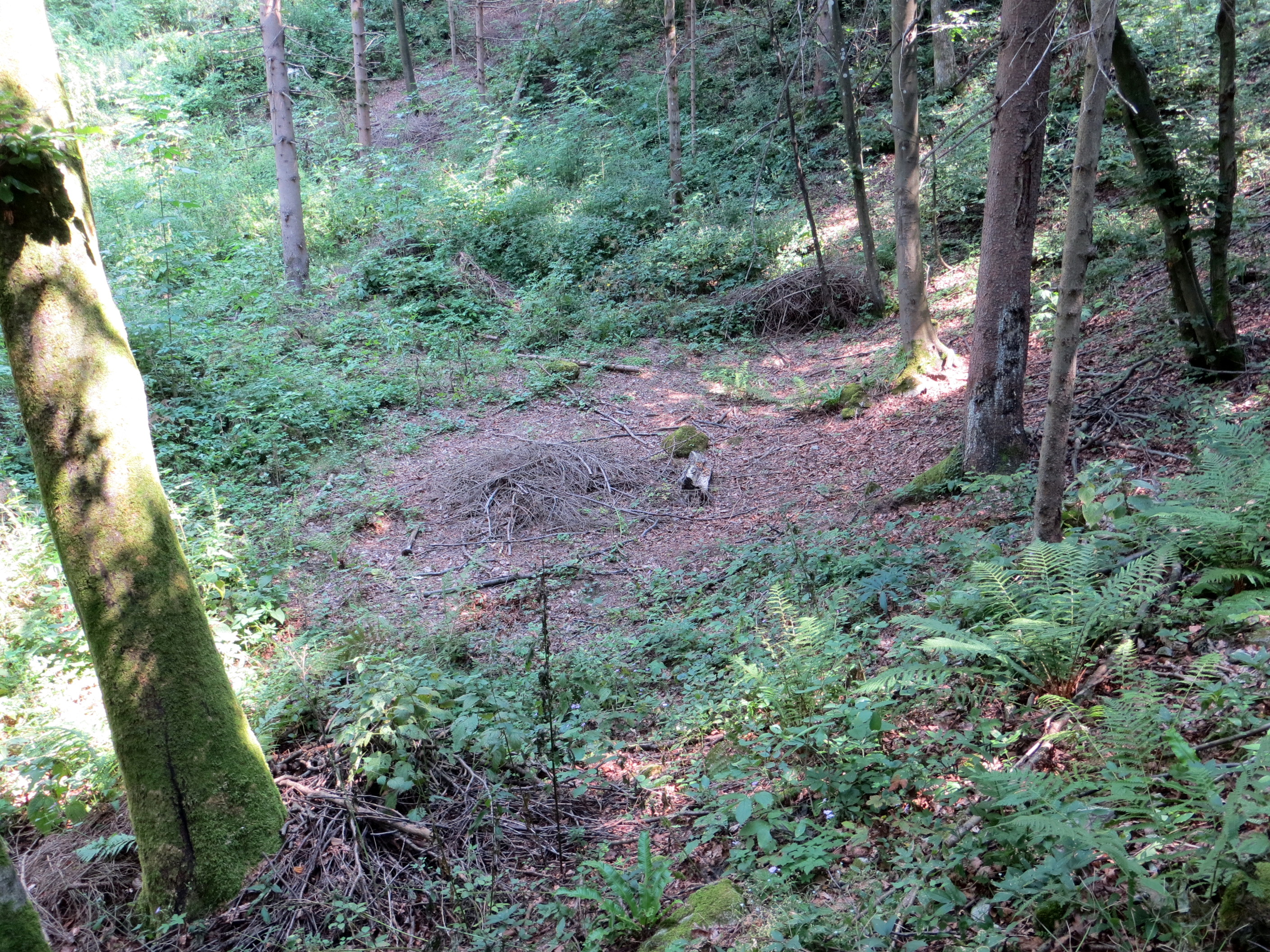
Pikec Valley Mass Grave

Vrhnika is the site of a mass grave from the period immediately after the Second World War. The Pikec Valley Mass Grave (Slovene: Grobišče pri Pikčevi dolini) is located at the bottom of a sinkhole southwest of the town, on Sveč Hill near the Vojc house. It contains the remains of six German prisoners of war that were murdered in May 1945.

== Cultural heritage ==
Several sites or structures in Vrhnika have protected cultural monument status:

- The Nauportus archaeological site (Arheološko najdišče Nauportus) lies in the southern part of the town. Finds include a prehistoric fort, remnants of a Roman village with docks, a Roman itinerary road, and a cemetery.
- The Fallen Partisan Monument and Tomb on Drča Hill (Spomenik z grobnico padlim v NOB na Drči) is located south of the town and was installed in 1949. It was designed by the architect Boris Kobe and the sculptor Boris Kalin.
- The Holy Trinity Hill water storage tank (Vodohram na Sv. Trojici) stands on the east side of Holy Trinity Hill (elevation: 350 meters or 1,150 feet). It was built of carved stone in 1904 under the mayorship of Gabrijel Jelovšek.

== Notable people ==
Notable people that were born or lived in Vrhnika include:

- Baltazar Baebler (1880–1936), chemist
- Arnošt Brilej (1891–1953), hiking and tourism specialist
- Ivan Cankar (1876–1918), writer
- Karel Cankar (1877–1953), journalist and editor
- Stane Dremelj (1906–1992), painter
- Karel Grabeljšek (1906–1985), writer
- Janko Grampovčan (1897–1974), economist
- Francis Jager (1869–1934), beekeeping and orchard expert
- Gabrijel Jelovšek (1858–1927), merchant
- France Kunstelj (1914–1945), author, playwright, and editor
- Franc Lah (1816–1890), sculptor
- Andrej Lenarčič (1859–1936), agricultural specialist
- Josip Lenarčič (1856–1939), merchant
- Anton Maier (1859–1943), education specialist
- Ignacij Mihevc (1870–1939), politician and journalist
- Floris Oblak (1924–2006), poet and writer
- Simon Ogrin (1851–1930), painter
- Franc Popit (1921–2013), communist politician
- Radoslav Silvester (1841–1923), poet and composer
- Ignac Voljč (nom de guerre Fric; 1904–1944), People's Hero of Yugoslavia
- Jakob Voljč (1878–1900), poet and writer
