= Jožef Petkovšek =

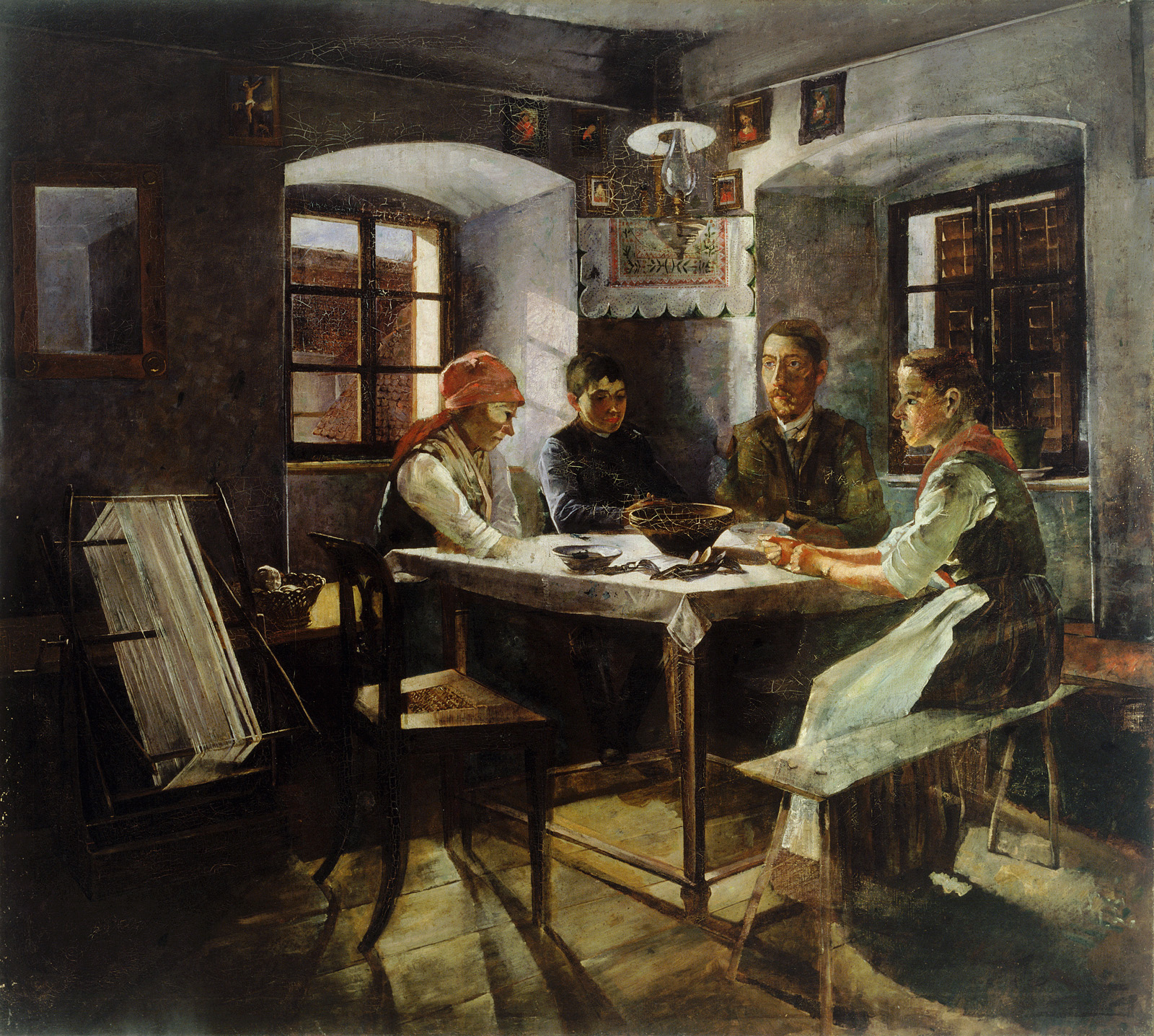
Doma (Home, 1889), by Jožef Petkovšek

Jožef Petkovšek (7 March 1861 – 22 April 1898) was an important Slovenian painter who brought existentialist and dark modernist themes to the Slovenian art scene. Despite a short and turbulent life, his work influenced the preeminent Slovenian novelist Ivan Cankar, was promoted by Rihard Jakopič, the famous impressionist painter, and led Slovenian art into the 20th century.

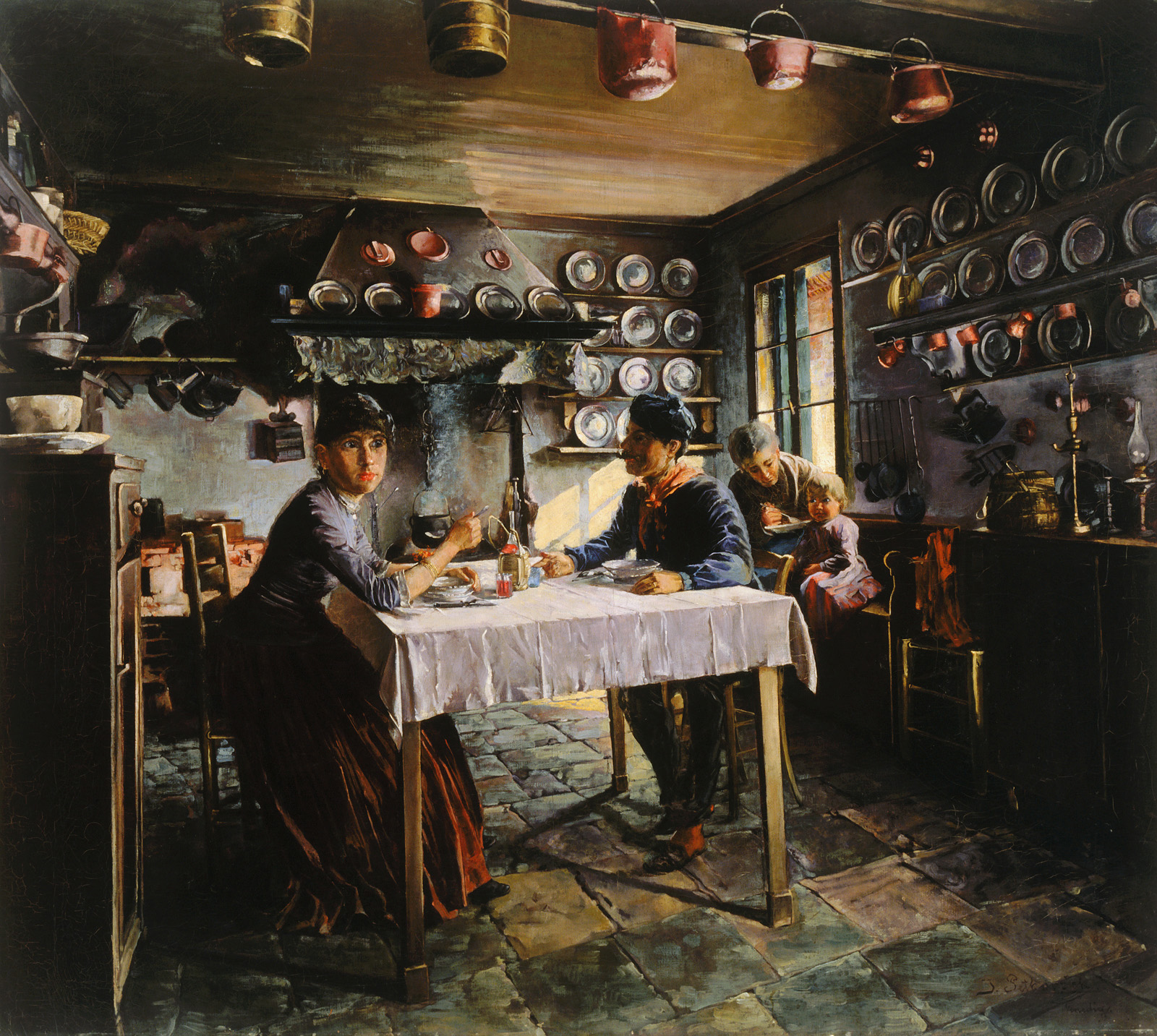
Beneška kuhinja (Venetian Kitchen, 1888)

== Biography ==
Petkovšek was born in the village of Verd, near the town of Vrhnika and about 20 kilometers from the capital of Ljubljana. Jožef was the youngest of 6 children, born to 68-year-old Andrej Petkovšek and 20-year-old Marija Stopar. His elderly father died only three years after Jožef's birth and the estate soon came under the custody of Franc Kotnik, a neighbor who would control the estate until Jožef came of age. Petkovšek attended local schools in Vrhnika and Idrija, and he even attended a school in Ljubljana for several years before returning home. At the age of 18 he volunteered for the Austro-Hungarian army and was sent to the occupied zone of Bosnia.

He served for a short time in the military and returned home, where he started painting. He visited Munich and Vienna to learn more about his craft, and in 1882, on the advice of illustrator Simon Ogrin, he visited an art academy in Venice, although he was never officially enrolled. In 1884 he went to Paris to join fellow Slovenian painter Jurij Šubic, and he practiced painting at the Louvre and other museums. The following year he returned to Verd because of an eye illness, but he continued painting at home and visited Ljubljana, Trieste, and Venice in an effort to further his career. The fact that he never received a formal education in fine arts and his lack of acceptance apparently created some self-doubt; on some documents he entered "painter?" as his profession. Several of the paintings he completed during this time period, however, now belong to the National Gallery's collection in Ljubljana.

In 1888 Jožef met 17-year-old Marija Filipesco on the street; he supposedly followed her through town and immediately proposed marriage. They were married on 2 October of the same year, with Jožef making his wife travel back to his hometown to show her off to a former lover who had refused to marry him. They visited Naples and Sicily on their honeymoon, but they had to return earlier than expected when Jožef became ill. It was around this time that Petkovšek's more serious troubles with mental and physical health began.

Like his father, half-brother and aunt, Petkovšek had severe problems with alcohol abuse. Because of debts and illness—with both certainly exacerbated by his alcoholism—he was forced to sell some of his possessions and property within a year of his marriage. In September 1889 the mayor of his town ordered him to be committed to an asylum after he jumped into the Ljubljanica River in a paranoid attempt to hide from the authorities. At the asylum it was reported that Petkovšek suffered from melancholy and chronic alcoholism. He was to remain institutionalized until June 1890. His return home was extremely turbulent, and he seems to have ruined several of his paintings at home during fits of madness. He destroyed a painting of his wife in her wedding dress, which fellow painter Matej Sternen considered one of his finest works, sometime during this time period. He also destroyed an earlier version of one of his more famous pieces, Beneška kuhinja (Venetian Kitchen), cutting it up and re-using the canvas. To pay off some of his debts, the municipal court sold some of his possessions, but amazingly considered his paintings to be without artistic value and did not attempt to sell them. His property was also legally assigned to caretakers. He was hospitalized again from 5 January to 10 October, 1891. Because of his constant battles with mental health, his financial problems persisted; in 1892 he sold some of his paintings to settle debts, and his house was the only possession that he maintained. In May 1892, he was admitted to an institution for the final time, and he spent the final 6 years of his life there. He died on 22 April, 1898, officially of dementia paralytica.

== Legacy ==
When Jožef Petkovšek died, not one Slovenian publication made notice of it. Several of his paintings, through various auctions, had ended up in local restaurants. It was not until 1908, 10 years after his death, that the renowned painter Rihard Jakopič acquired much of Petkovšek's work. In 1910, amidst a growing sense of Slovenian nationalism, Jakopič curated an exhibit entitled 80 Years of Art in Slovenia and chose three of Petkovšek's paintings to be shown. Jakopič later established the National Gallery, which now houses many of the known remaining works of Petkovšek. In 1914, revered Slovenian author Ivan Cankar wrote a short story inspired by the artist's work, entitled "Petkovškov obraz" (Petkovšek's Face), further enhancing the deceased artist's reputation.

While recognition was belated, Petkovšek is now generally accepted among Slovenia's most important artists of the late 19th century, and he is considered a forerunner of the expressionist movement that followed his death. He was the first artist to paint agricultural life in Slovenia, but his sometimes haunting depictions of the isolation of that bucolic life, best seen in Izplačevanje koscev (1884) and Doma (Home, 1889), point to a dark modernism and existentialism for which he became posthumously famous. Art historian and professor Milček Komelj wrote that Petkovšek had no contemporary comparisons in the Slovenian art world, most of whom were considered realists and impressionists; in fact, Petkovšek ignored the accepted norms of the academic realism of the time with his use of colors in strong contrast. Komelj also wrote that Petkovšek’s Doma (Home) is the only Slovenian painting from the 19th century which later became so influential that it received the respect of the fine arts and literary communities and was the subject of artistic homage. Komelj even posited that the artist is sometimes thought of as the Slovenian van Gogh because his work directed the development of art in his country into the 20th century in terms of modernity and creativity. The first major retrospective of his work was exhibited at the National Gallery in Ljubljana in 1982, and other exhibits followed in 1999 and 2015.

== Work ==
Seventeen of his paintings, both finished and unfinished, along with several studies, belong to the National Gallery's collection in Ljubljana.
